= Caligula the Musical =

Musical written by Pepe Cibrián

Caligula the Musical (Spanish: Calígula, el musical) is a tragic Argentine musical inspired by the life of the titular Roman emperor from the Julio-Claudian dynasty. It was written by Pepe Cibrián with original music by Martín Bianchedi.

== Productions ==
It premiered in 1983 in Buenos Aires, during the 1976–1983 dictatorship, and made a comparison between the cruelty of Caligula and Argentinian state terrorism, which ended with thirty thousand disappeared. It had a small cast of nine people. The musical was not targeted by the government due to the belief that it was just a musical. However, Cibrián and the cast did create a second, more tame version of the show, which they performed when government officials came to supervise or observe rehearsals.

In 2002, it returned for a run in Buenos Aires, in the Teatro del Globo, with a new musical adaptation by Ángel Mahler and a small cast of fourteen people and a live orchestra. It was directed by Cibrián and choreographed by Rubén Cuello. The message of the show was adapted to the December 2001 Argentinazo crisis. It received a positive review from La Nacion.

In 2005, the Premier de Buenos-Aires theater put on a version with a cast of twenty people plus a live orchestra. In September of that year it traveled to Santa Fe to perform. In 2013, it was performed at the Konex de Buenos Aires with a cast of 17 people.

== Cast recording ==
Caligula the Musical released a cassette in 1983, and a CD in 2002, through La Isla studios. The disc contained the principle voices of Damián Iglesias and Giselle Dufour.

The 1983 recording contained the following songs:

- 1. Obertura
- 2. Toma el poder
- 3. Tema de Calígula
- 4. Pobre pueblo
- 5. Cesonia
- 6. Casamiento
- 7. Goza
- 8. Que viva
- 9. Pobre César
- 10. Venus imperial
- 11. Debo darle un final
- 12. Se acerca la luz
- 13. Final (Tema de Calígula)

The 2002 CD contained the following songs:

- 1. Esto tú tendrás
- 2. Existo y existiré
- 3. Llegada de Drusila
- 4. Corre
- 5. Un nuevo césar
- 6. Pobre pueblo
- 7. Libertad
- 8. Yo soy Dios
- 9. Si yo pudiese
- 10. Cesonia
- 11. Ser madre
- 12. Senadores
- 13. Baile Mnester
- 14. Goza
- 15. Toma mi vida
- 16. Vivo
- 17. Corran ya
- 18. Como darte
- 19. Pobre César
- 20. Confesión
- 21. Venus imperial
- 22. Violación querea
- 23. Toma el poder
- 24. Debo
- 25. Muerte Mnester
- 26. Muerte Drusila
- 27. Muerte Calígula
- 28. Final
