= Banking in Argentina =

During the 1990s, marked by President Carlos Menem's policies of liberalization, Argentina's financial system saw a significant consolidation and strengthening, in large part through foreign investment. In addition to high reserve and capital-adequacy requirements, the Central Bank of Argentina maintained a repurchase agreement with a consortium of international banks to provide a $6,000 million safety net in the event of a liquidity squeeze.

Mergers and acquisitions, which decreased the number of Argentine banks from nearly 300 in 1990 to fewer than 100 at the end of 1999, were expected to continue and lead to improvements in management and efficiency. The foreign currency reserves of the Central Bank stood at nearly $25,000 million in December 1999, or over 9 months of imports. However, these reserves were used to back the monetary liabilities of the Central Bank and were not available for conducting monetary policy; by the terms of the Convertibility Law, each Argentine peso in circulation was to be matched by one American dollar in the reserves.

Despite the recession (started in 1998 after the international economic shock due to the 1998 Russian financial crisis), bank deposits continued to grow until 2001, although at a much slower rate than in previous years. Total deposits in the banking system stood at nearly $80,000 million by mid-2001 — more than twice that of June 1995, when deposits hit a low of $37,000 million. Foreign-controlled banks held over 40% of total deposits, and six of the top 10 commercial banks were in the hands of American and European financial institutions.

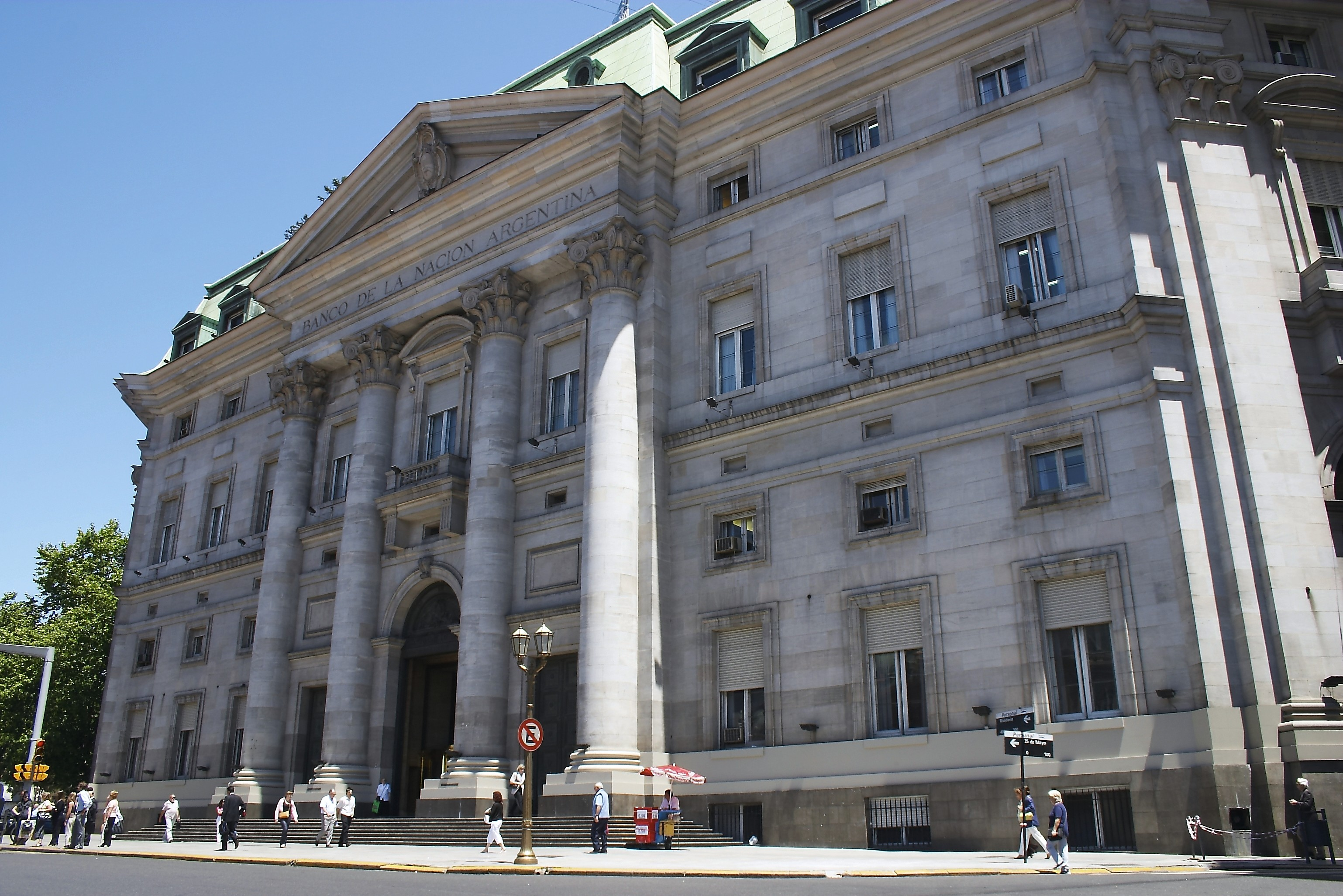
Bank of the Argentine Nation, Buenos Aires

Still, the level of bank utilization in Argentina remained relatively low, and bank intermediation represented only about 30% of the GDP — a much lower ratio than those of Chile, Mexico, or Brazil, for example.

Nevertheless, the banking system suffered a fatal flaw: it lent dollars and took deposits in Argentine pesos (nominally argendollars). By early 2001, deposits had reached $87,000 million, but when the economy took a second dip, capital started flowing out of Argentina, and deposits started to move away from the weaker players of the financial system, namely provincial banks and large local banks.

This eventually led to a run on all banks in the system, a freeze in deposits, and a currency devaluation, which included an asymmetric devaluation of loans and deposits. Banks were forced to collect their dollar loans at a conversion rate much lower than the rate applied to its dollar deposits. This made many banks technically bankrupt and destroyed the confidence of the public in the financial system, which was held responsible for many of the economic ills of the country.

Deposits fell to less than $40,000 million by the end of 2002. Foreign banks fled the country during 2002 and 2003, selling their operations to smaller local banks at a fraction of their original investments. Only a few large foreign banks decided to stay.

In 2004, the government compensated the banks for the impact of the asymmetric devaluation of deposits and loans through a series of "compensation bonds".

Currently banks are again gaining deposits, which amounted to more than $44,000 million by February 2006, and have been increasing their lending portfolios. Their operations are leaner, due to the massive layoffs of 2002, that reduced their working force by more than 30%. However, the Argentine population still remains extremely distrustful and wary of taking long-term loans, and rates are high in real terms given Argentina's low rates of inflation. Banking penetration remains low and banking costs high.

The Argentine banking sector is currently dominated by state-owned banks, with the largest being the Banco de la Nación Argentina. In 2005, for the first time since the 2001 collapse, the banking system made a profit, according to a Central Bank report released in February 2006. The total profits amounted to 1,958 million pesos (more than $650 million).

== See also ==
- Argentine economic crisis (1999–2002)
- Corralito
