= Argentine economic emergency law =

1998–2002 Argentine
great depression

Economy of Argentina
Argentine peso
Convertibility plan
Corralito
Corralón
Cacerolazo
2001 riots
Apagón
Economic emergency law
Debt restructuring

The Argentine economic emergency law was sanctioned in 2002, during the presidency of Eduardo Duhalde. As a result of the 2001 economic crisis, the law set a state of emergency on the national economy. The law allowed the president to do things that are usually set to the Congress, such as influence the exchange rate, turn debts in US dollars into debts in Argentine pesos, set the price of taxes and tariffs, renew contracts with the providers of public services, set the price of some products, and taxes on oils, among other things.

Initially, the law was expected to be in force for two years. However, the governments of Néstor Kirchner and Cristina Fernández de Kirchner always asked the Congress to renew it for two more years. It was renewed for the last time in December 2015, nearing the end of the presidency of Cristina Kirchner. President Mauricio Macri did not ask for such renewal in December 2017, and so the law ceased to be in force in the first days of 2018, 16 years after its initial sanction.
