= Convertibility plan =

1990s economic policy pegging the Argentine peso to the US dollar

1998–2002 Argentine
great depression
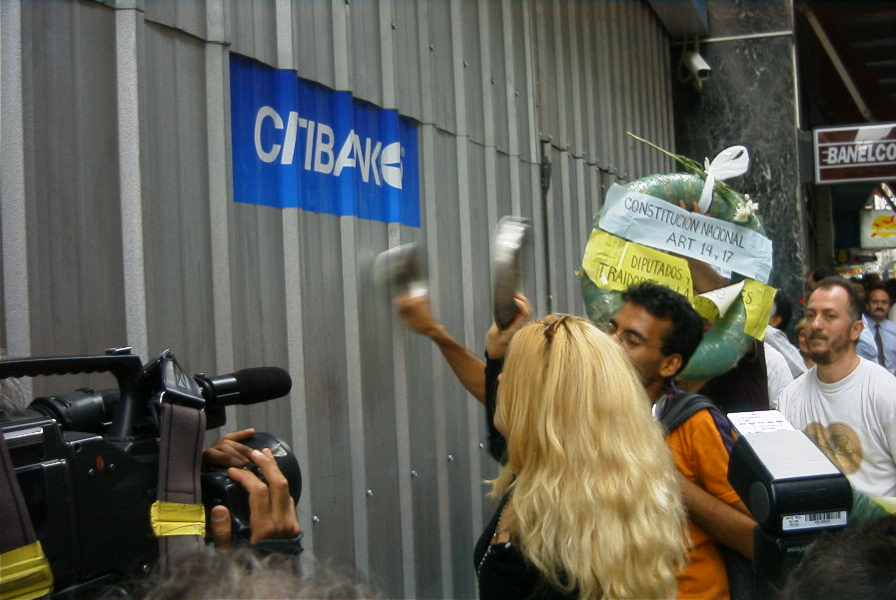

Economy of Argentina
Argentine peso
Convertibility plan
Corralito
Corralón
Cacerolazo
2001 riots
Apagón
Economic emergency law
Debt restructuring

The Convertibility plan was a plan by the Argentine Currency Board that pegged the Argentine peso to the U.S. dollar between 1991 and 2002 in an attempt to eliminate hyperinflation and stimulate economic growth. While it initially met with considerable success, the board's actions ultimately failed. The peso was only pegged to the dollar until 2002.

== Background ==
For most of the period between 1975 and 1990, Argentina experienced hyperinflation (averaging 325% a year), poor or negative GDP growth, a severe lack of confidence in the national government and the Central Bank, and low levels of capital investment. After eight currency crises since the early 1970s, inflation peaked in 1989, reaching 5,000% that year. GDP was 10% lower than in 1980 and per capita GDP had fallen by over 20%. Fixed investment fell by over half and, by 1989, could not cover yearly depreciation - particularly in the industrial sector. Social indicators deteriorated seriously: real wages collapsed to about half of their 1974 peak and income poverty rates increased from 27% in 1980 to 47% in 1989.

To a large extent, the main reason behind this long period of hyperinflation was unsustainable growth of the money supply to finance the large fiscal deficits maintained by successive governments. Driven by rising tax evasion and losses among state enterprises, the total public fiscal deficit reached 10% of GDP in 1983. Austerity measures pursued by President Raúl Alfonsín trimmed this 4% in 1985, though the 1989 crisis pushed the shortfall to 7.6% (which could only be financed by suspending debt interest payments). Since Argentina could not participate meaningfully in world capital markets given the great investment risk it posed, the only course available was the financing of these fiscal deficits by monetizing them. This meant that the government levied an inflation tax to pay for the fiscal deficits, which in turn contributed to stalling growth.

Another reason for the instability of the Argentine currency was the fragility of domestic financial institutions. The Argentine banking crisis of 1990 underlined this point, as the Central Bank moved to confiscate the deposits of commercial banks with the BONEX plan, to overcome a liquidity crunch by exchanging certain types of time deposits for BONEX bonds. Tightening domestic credit became increasingly limited to the public sector: only US$17 billion of loans outstanding (45% of the total) were accounted for by private sector borrowers, and this declined to US$7 billion during the 1989 crisis. Accordingly, the nation's money supply (M2) fell by nearly identical figures, while affluent Argentine nationals held over US$50 billion overseas.

There were also external factors that further triggered the currency crisis, such as interest rate fluctuations. In the early 1980s, for example, the United States imposed tight monetary discipline upon its own institutions, which made it more expensive to borrow money because banks were required to keep higher reserve requirements. Erratic or punitive responses to global financial vagaries by the Central Bank of Argentina itself often left the Argentine economy bearing the brunt. One particularly damaging austerity policy was the Central Bank Circular 1050. Enacted in 1980, it tied monthly installment payments to the value of the U.S. dollar in Argentina, which rose over ten-fold between early 1981 and July 1982, when new Central Bank President Domingo Cavallo rescinded the surcharge (by then, commercial banks had been writing off 5% of their loan portfolio a month). The debacle shattered credit market confidence locally for the rest of the 1980s, directly contributing to the negative economic climate in Argentina during those years.

Carlos Menem took office six months in advance. His early attempts to stabilize inflation failed, resulting in further depreciation of the austral and a serious reduction in the Central Bank's foreign currency reserves.

In April 1991, Menem reverted the country's policies according to ideas of Washington Consensus to what was later to be called economic neoliberalism. This system involved a program of massive privatization and labor deregulation laws, which encouraged foreign investment and infused the country with cash to finance its fiscal deficits. However, the linchpin of the new system was the introduction of the Convertibility System.

At the time, there was much debate in Argentina and abroad about how to control inflation and build confidence in local currencies in order to foster investment and growth. There were three options of exchange rate management available to any government: a floating exchange rate, a super-fixed exchange rate (including the possible use of a currency board), or a hybrid system (otherwise known as a soft-peg) such as that which Mexico undertook. The hybrid system consisted of various levels of control over exchange rates, and it was discredited in the early 1990s when empirical evidence from several currency crises showed that, in a world of high capital mobility, a semi-fixed exchange rate was very unstable, because it allowed a country with poor monetary policy to exercise too much discretionary power. The consequence was that a government had to choose between either fixed or fully floating exchange rate systems.

Before the implementation of the currency board there was much debate over which currency or currencies to peg the peso against. In the view of many economists, the peso should have been pegged to a basket of currencies from the countries that were Argentina's major trading partners. Others argued that the peso should be pegged to the U.S. dollar because it would provide simplicity of understanding, the highest degree of safety, greater international credibility, and the promise of increased trade with the United States. The latter argument won the day, with both positive and negative consequences.

Argentina's currency board established a fixed pegging of one-to-one parity between the peso and the U.S. dollar. It also guaranteed full convertibility of pesos into U.S. dollars. The government hoped to establish local and international credibility in the peg and to limit the amount of local control over monetary and fiscal policy. The currency board regime intended to stabilize the peso, encourage both foreign and local investment, and foster sustained economic growth.

== Flaws in implementation ==
The main qualities of an orthodox currency board are:

- A currency board maintains absolute, unlimited convertibility between its notes and coins and the currency against which they are pegged, at a fixed rate of exchange, with no restrictions on current-account or capital-account transactions.
- A currency board's foreign currency reserves must be sufficient to ensure that all holders of its notes and coins can convert them into the reserve currency (usually 110–115%).
- A currency board only earns profit from interest on reserves (less the expense of note-issuing), and does not engage in forward-exchange transactions.
- A currency board has no discretionary powers to affect monetary policy and does not lend to the government. Governments cannot print money, and can only tax or borrow to meet their spending commitments.
- A currency board does not act as a lender of last resort to commercial banks, and does not regulate reserve requirements.
- A currency board does not attempt to manipulate interest rates by establishing a discount rate like a central bank. The peg with the foreign currency tends to keep interest rates and inflation very closely aligned to those in the country against whose currency the peg is fixed.

The Argentine currency board violated all these rules at one time or another, except that of a fixed exchange rate. Full convertibility with the U.S. dollar became jeopardized upon implementation of exchange rate controls that provided a preferential exchange rate for exports. The currency board was allowed to hold up to one-third of its dollar-denominated reserves in the form of bonds issued by the government of Argentina. It acted as lender of last resort and regulated reserve requirements for commercial banks. And it engaged in monetary policy activities. The impact of all this was to reduce the credibility of the Argentine government's intent, and to put speculative pressure on the peso, despite the peg.

== Results of the currency board ==
Argentina implemented its currency board in April 1991. Its main achievement was in controlling inflation, which was brought down from more than 3,000% in 1989 to 3.4% in 1994.

Another major accomplishment of the system was renewed economic growth. Enjoying the high world prices of primary products (Argentina's main exports), GDP grew at an annual rate of 8% between 1991 until the Tequila Effect of 1995. Even after the Mexican crisis, until 1998 the annual growth rate was 6%.

International trade also increased dramatically, reflecting the growing degree of openness of the country. Imports increased from US$11.6 billion in 1991 to US$32.3 billion in 2000. Likewise, exports also increased from US$12.1 billion in 1991 to US$30.7 billion in 2000.

Despite these impressive results, side effects on social issues included increased unemployment, unequal income distribution and decreased wages. Unemployment increased from 6.1% in 1991 to 15% in 2000 as the fixed exchange rate increased foreign price competition and forced local firms to invest in more advanced technologies that required less labor and higher productivity.

Income inequality increased: the bottom 20% of the population decreased its share of national income from 4.6% in 1991 to 4.1% in 2000, while the top 20% of the population increased its share from 50.4% to 51.4%.

Initially, the poverty rate declined as hyperinflation receded, reaching 17% by 1993 (implying that the inflation tax was primarily absorbed by low-income households), but after the Mexican crisis the trend reversed. Although overall wages increased, they did not benefit all workers equally. Skilled and unskilled workers lost ground compared to managerial and professional income groups.

Government debt increased sharply. Unwilling or unable to raise taxes, and precluded from printing money by the currency board system, the government's only other recourse to finance its budget deficit was to issue debt instruments in the capital markets. Public debt increased sharply from 29.5% of GDP in 1993 to 50.3% in 1999. Moreover, this debt was in foreign currency, since the domestic private savings remained low, and it took place despite large inflows of income from the privatization of formerly state-owned companies. Associated with the increase in public debt was an increase in the debt service ratio, which increased from 22% of exports in 1993 to 35.2% in 1999, exacerbating an increasing current account deficit.

Part of President Menem's program included large-scale privatization of state-owned companies. Unfortunately, because of the fixed exchange rate, privatization agreements generally linked price increase flexibility to the rate of U.S. inflation, which was often higher than that in Argentina. The relative prices of public utilities thus increased and shifted wealth from the state to the privatized firms which, without any exchange control restraints, were free to expatriate these windfalls and invest them elsewhere.

External shocks also affected the Argentine currency board. The first was the Mexican crisis of 1994–1995, resulting in a liquidity crunch that drove interest rates sharply higher, stalling growth and spurring unemployment. In quick succession, the ensuing 1997 Asian and 1998 Russian financial crises pounded at the economy by further increasing interest rates as foreign investors became much warier of where they invested their assets, continuing to keep the cost of borrowing high for Argentina. The Brazilian crisis of 1999 probably had the most severe effect, because Brazil is Argentina's largest trading partner, and the crisis was coupled with an appreciating U.S. dollar and a slump in the world prices of primary products. Argentina's competitiveness in world markets was severely hit, given the peso's link to the appreciating U.S. dollar and weakening demand in its northern trading partner. As a result, the economy stalled and subsequently contracted.

These ongoing crises and the strong U.S. dollar in the late 1990s put the spotlight on the decision to peg the peso to the U.S. dollar rather than to a basket of currencies that were better aligned with its trade patterns. While Argentina was mostly trading with countries (Europe and Brazil) that did not have the U.S. dollar as their currency, the peso was fluctuating according to the U.S. dollar and not according to Argentina's actual economic position (this is known as the "third currency phenomenon"). Simply put, the dollar peg overvalued the peso in the rest of the world, especially against a weak euro and the Brazilian real, reducing Argentina's competitiveness and compounding the account deficit.

== Abandonment of the peg ==
During the second half of 2001, the pressure mounted on the currency board but there was no clear way out. Since most of country's debt was denominated in U.S. dollars, there would be a huge cost to breaking the peg, not to mention the long-term damage to Argentina's credibility in world capital markets. On the other hand, allowing the market to determine the exchange rate would radically improve competitiveness and eliminate the current account deficit along with the need to borrow money to finance it. Many solutions were considered, including changing the peg to a currency basket of U.S. dollars and euros (which would have entailed an effective and controlled devaluation of the peso), and dollarization (using U.S. dollars as the country's only currency).

On December 3, 2001, the minister Domingo Cavallo restricted bank deposit withdrawals to a maximum of 1000 pesos/dollars per month until 3 March 2002. This was popularly known as Corralito. The effect of the Corralito was so unpopular that president de la Rúa and Cavallo had to resign. First Ramón Puerta took the presidency, followed by Rodríguez Sáa two days later. In the week he was in charge, Argentina suspended payments on its external debt. In January 2002, the new president Eduardo Duhalde ordered his finance minister Jorge Remes Lenicov to repeal the Convertibility Law and adopt a new, provisional fixed exchange rate of 1.4 pesos to the dollar (a 29% devaluation) and the conversion of all the bank accounts denominated in dollars into pesos and its transformation in bonds ("Corralon"); soon afterward it completely abandoned its peg and allowed the peso to float freely, resulting in a swift depreciation of the peso, which lost 75% of its value with respect to the U.S. dollar in a matter of months, stabilizing at a rate of 2.9 pesos per dollar by 2003.

The reason of this incredible depreciation of the peso was not the economic crisis or the overvaluation, it was the "pesification" of all the accounts. As a consequence of the pesification of every account in Argentina, the 100 billion dollars that were in the banks were changed to 100 billion pesos. This caused an enormous demand for dollars and transformed the normal change of 1.40 pesos per dollar to 4 pesos per dollar in 5 months.

== Sources ==
- Baer, Werner, Elosegui, Pedro & Gallo, Andrés. (2002) The Achievements and Failures of Argentina's Neo-Liberal Economic Policies, Oxford Development Studies, Vol. 30, No. 1, pp. 63–85.
- Bird, Graham. (2002) Argentina's Currency Board: Cry for Argentina - But not for its currency board, New Economy: Surrey Centre for International Economic Studies, pp. 158–165.
- Cavallo, Domingo F. & Cottani, Joaquin A. (1997) Argentina's Convertibility Plan and the IMF, AEA Papers and Proceedings, May, Vol. 87, No. 2, pp. 17–22.
- de la Torre, Augusto; Levy Yeyati, Eduardo & Schmukler, Sergio L. (2003) Living and Dying with Hard Pegs: The Rise and Fall of Argentina's Currency Board, Journal of LACEA Economia, LACEA - LATIN AMERICAN AND CARIBBEAN ECONOMIC ASSOCIATION.
- Dornbusch, Rudi. (2001) Exchange Rates and the Choice of Monetary-Policy Regimes: Fewer Monies, Better Monies, AEA Papers and Proceedings, May, Volume 91, No. 2, pp. 238–242.
- Edwards, Sebastian. (2002) The Great Exchange Rate Debate after Argentina, The North American Journal of Economics and Finance, Volume 13, Issue 3, pp. 237–252.
- Gurtner, Francois J. (2003) Currency Boards and Debt Traps: Evidence from Argentina and Relevance for Estonia, (Oxford, Blackwell Publishing Ltd.), pp. 209–228.
- Hanke, Steve H. (2002) On Dollarization and Currency Boards: Error and Deception, Policy Reform, Vol 5 (4), pp. 203–222.
- Hanke, Steve H. (2003) The Argentine Straw Man: A response to Currency Board Critics, Cato Journal, Spring/Summer, Vol. 23, No. 1, p. 47-57.
- Horn, Gustav A., Fritsche, Ulrich. (2002) Argentina in Crisis, DIW Economic Bulletin, Vol. 39, No. 4, pp. 119–126.
- Levy Yeyati, Eduardo (2006) Liquidity Insurance in a Financially Dollarized Economy, NBER Working Papers 12345, National Bureau of Economic Research, Inc.
- Schuler, Kurt. (2002) Fixing Argentina, Policy Analysis, July 16, No. 445.

== See also ==
- Economy of Argentina
- Argentine economic crisis (1999-2002)
