= December 2001 riots in Argentina =

Period of civil unrest in Argentina

Argentinazo
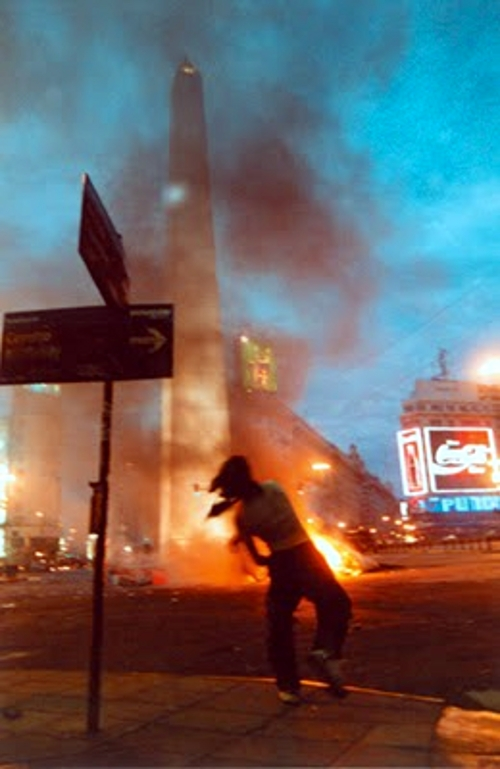
- Unrest in Buenos Aires on 20 December 2001
- Date: 19–20 December 2001
- Location: Argentina
- Caused by: Economic crisis Corralito; Political instability Crisis of the Convertibility plan
- Result: President Fernando de la Rúa declared a state of siege.; President Fernando de la Rúa resigned from office.; Ramón Puerta assumed as interim president of the Senate in charge of the Executive Branch. Justicialist Party returned to power after two years of opposition.

Parties
Government of Argentina	Protesters

Lead figures
Fernando de la Rúa	No centralized leadership

Casualties and losses
172 policemen wounded	39 civilians killed 〜4,000 civilians detained

The December 2001 crisis, sometimes known as Cacerolazo or Argentinazo (pronounced [aɾxentiˈnaso]), was a period of civil unrest and rioting in Argentina, which took place during December 2001, with the most violent incidents taking place on 19 and 20 December in the capital, Buenos Aires, Rosario and other large cities around the country. It was preceded by a popular revolt against the Argentine government, rallying behind the motto "All of them must go!" (Spanish: ¡Que se vayan todos!), which caused the resignation of then-president Fernando de la Rúa, giving way to a period of political instability during which five government officials successively performed the duties of the Argentine presidency. This period of instability occurred during the larger period of crisis known as the Argentine great depression, an economic, political, and social crisis that lasted from 1998 until 2002.

The December 2001 crisis was a direct response to the government's imposition of "Corral" policies (Spanish: Corralito) at the behest of economic minister Domingo Cavallo, which restricted people's ability to withdraw cash from banks. Rioting and protests became widespread on 19 December 2001, immediately following the president's declaration of a state of emergency and his resignation on the following day. A state of extreme institutional instability continued for the next twelve days, during which the successor president Adolfo Rodríguez Saá resigned as well. While the degree of instability subsided, the events of December 2001 would become a blow against the legitimacy of the Argentine government that would persist for the following years.

Most participants in the protests were unaffiliated with any political party or organization. Over the course of the protests, 39 people were killed by police and security forces, most of them during sackings in provinces governed by the Peronists opposition. Of the 39 killed, nine were minors.

== Background ==
1998–2002 Argentine
great depression
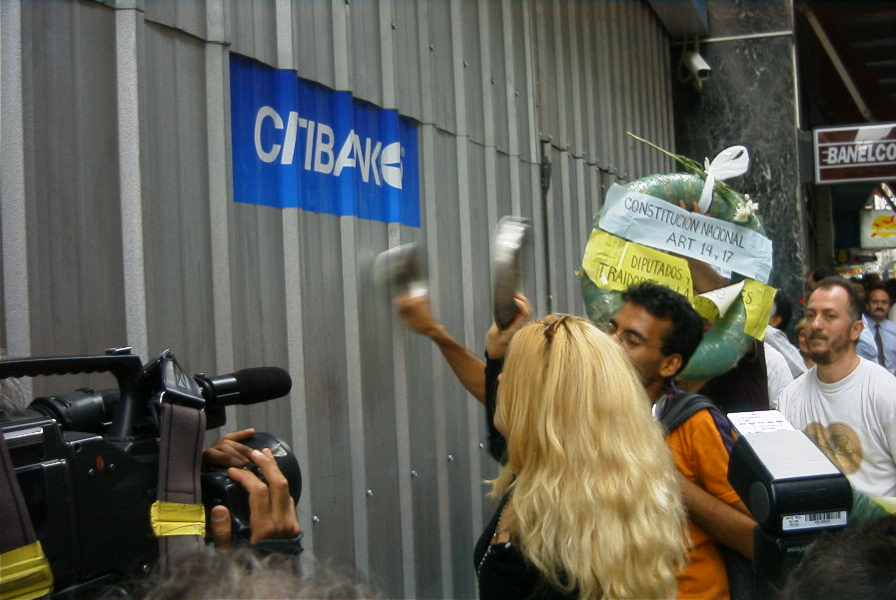

Economy of Argentina
Argentine peso
Convertibility plan
Corralito
Corralón
Cacerolazo
2001 riots
Apagón
Economic emergency law
Debt restructuring

=== The Argentine economy ===
Fernando de la Rúa, as the candidate for the Alliance for Work, Justice and Education, had assumed the role of president in December 1999 in the middle of a recession, which was caused in part by the Convertibility plan (Spanish: Ley de Convertibilidad) passed in 1991 which pegged the value of the Argentine peso to the United States dollar.

While political reforms under the previous president Carlos Menem had succeeded in reducing inflation, the downsides of his economic policies became more and more apparent starting in 1997. Maintaining the convertibility of pesos to dollars required the government of Argentina to obtain an abundant supply of American dollars. At first, this supply was maintained by the privatization of nearly all of the Argentine state's industries and pension funds. As the privatization process was completed, Argentina's agriculture export-based economy was unable to maintain a sufficient flow of dollars to the state, and the system began to require more and more sovereign debt.

=== Fernando de la Rúa's presidency ===
One of the key factors leading to the victory of the Alliance in the 1999 elections was its promise to uphold the convertibility plan. One of de la Rúa's campaign slogans declared "With me, one peso, one dollar" (Spanish: Conmigo, un peso, un dólar). Despite a changing international economic situation (including economic downturns in Brazil, one of Argentina's key economic partners), and mounting demands for increased monetary sovereignty from the left and some Peronists, the Alliance committed itself to maintain the status quo at all costs.

==== October 2000 Crisis ====
De la Rúa's political situation was precarious. His arrival to power in 1999 had been possible thanks to the Alliance for Work, Justice and Education (Spanish: Alianza para el Trabajo, la Justicia y la Educación), a coalition formed by the Radical Civic Union and the FrePaSo, which managed to defeat the incumbent Justicialist Party (the Peronist party) in that year's presidential elections. However, the Alliance (as it was known) failed to achieve a majority in the Senate and Chamber of Deputies, and lost the provincial elections to the Peronists, who then remained in charge of large and critical districts such as the Buenos Aires, Córdoba and Santa Fe provinces.

The government coalition was strained from the first moment; the FrePaSo leaders resented being "junior members" of the government (being forced to that position after losing their bid to the Governorship of Buenos Aires), while the Radicals were divided between their left- and right-leaning factions (De la Rúa was a leader of the party's conservatives), especially regarding economic policy. In late 2000 a political scandal broke out when it was reported that SIDE, Argentina's intelligence service, had paid massive bribes to a number of senators to approve a controversial Labor Reform Act. The head of SIDE, Fernando de Santibañes, was a personal friend of De la Rúa. The crisis came to a head in October 2000 when Vice President Carlos Álvarez resigned, citing De la Rúa's unwillingness to tackle corruption.

==== March 2001 Crisis ====
De la Rúa's economic policies suffered a severe blow in March 2001 when Economy Minister José Luis Machinea resigned from office. He was briefly replaced by the then-Defense Minister Ricardo López Murphy, who himself was forced to resign following negative reception to his shock program. After only two weeks in office, López Murphy was replaced by Domingo Cavallo, who had previously served as Economy Minister between 1991 and 1996, and who was the original author of the Convertibility plan during Menem's presidency.

Because of the worsening economic situation and mounting foreign debt, the government enacted two enormous campaigns of debt-expansion and refinancing under the supervision of the International Monetary Fund (IMF), named "The armoring" (Spanish: El blindaje) and "The Megaexchange" (Spanish: El Megacanje) respectively. From the first moment, there were allegations of corruption and money laundering about the megacanje.

The crisis also caused the resignation of all the FrePaSo Cabinet ministers, leaving de la Rúa without political support. The congressional elections of October 2001 were a disaster for the government, which lost many of its seats in the Senate and the Chamber of Deputies to the Peronists. The election results marked also a growing unrest within Argentina's voters, who took to cast millions of null or blank votes. The Peronists seized the opportunity to appoint Senator Ramón Puerta to be President Pro-Tempore of the Argentine Senate, a situation which added to De la Rúa's political weakness since in the Argentine system the President Pro-Tempore of the Senate is next in line for the Presidency after the Vice President. With no Vice President of its own, Puerta's designation meant that De la Rúa had a virtual Peronist Vice President.

Social unrest was also growing. Since the late 1990s, protest movements had formed in Argentina, notably the piqueteros ("picketeers"), initially made up of unemployed workers. The piqueteros blockaded major roads and highways demanding government subsidies and other welfare measures. They featured prominently during the March 2001 crisis.

The crisis reached a breaking point on 29 November 2001, as major investors began to withdraw their deposits from the banks, summarily causing the collapse of the Argentine banking system due to capital flight. This was compounded by the IMF's decision to refuse to refinance Argentina's debt.

=== Corralito ===
At the beginning of December 2001, the IMF cut off the flow of funds to Argentina and capital flight became uncontrollable, with 25% of all the money in Argentine banks having been withdrawn since the beginning of 2001. On 2 December, Finance Minister Cavallo announced a national cash-withdrawal limit of $250/week. Popular opinion was very negative, especially amongst the middle class (bearing in mind that the weekly withdrawal limit was higher than the total savings of the majority of the Argentine population), for whom the economic crisis caused a breach of political confidence. Protests were held throughout December, although the largest and most important protests were those held on 19 and 20 December.

Although people could still use their money via credit cards, checks and other forms of non-cash payments, the enforcement of these measures caused delays and problems for the general population, especially businesses. Massive queues at every bank, and growing reports of political crises contributed to inflame Argentina's political scenario.

De la Rúa's position had become unsustainable, and an attempt by the Catholic Church to mediate between the government and the opposition in mid-December failed. Between 16 and 19 December there were several incidents involving unemployed activists and protesters who demanded the handing-out of food bags from supermarkets. These incidents ended up with outright looting of supermarkets and convenience stores on 18 December, taking place in the Rosario and Greater Buenos Aires areas.

=== General strike and looting ===
On 13 December, the General Confederation of Labour and the Argentine Workers' Central Union declared their seventh general strike against the policies of de la Rúa's government. The strike had a high participation rate, including strikes in sectors that rarely participated in general strikes, such as the financial sector and un-unionized workplaces.

During the time of the strike, there were riots in the working-class neighborhoods of some cities, largely instigated by the striking piqueteros. Looting occurred in various commercial districts in the country's interior and in Buenos Aires. Thousands of people participated in looting, truck-robbery, and street-blocking. From 13 to 19 December, seven people were killed by security forces and shopowners.

== 19 December ==
19 December 2001, President De la Rúa declares the state of siege throughout the country. Following the broadcast, a strong "cacerolazo" took place in Buenos Aires and other major cities of Argentina, and thousands took the streets and main plazas in protest. (video in Spanish)

Throughout the day new lootings took place, and the Government believed that Peronist agitators were fueling the protests, especially in the province of Buenos Aires. This came after noting that the lootings often took place in Peronist-governed towns, and that the Buenos Aires Provincial Police (which ultimately answered to Buenos Aires Governor Carlos Ruckauf, a top Peronist) was strangely mild in restoring order. With violence mounting across Argentina's major cities, President De la Rúa began to consider alternative measures to restore order.

The first option considered was to deploy the military to contain the violence. However, Argentine legislation forbids military intervention in domestic security matters unless the police and security forces are overwhelmed, a situation quickly pointed out by the Chairman of the Joint General Staff and the Chiefs of Staff of the Army, Navy and Air Force. The military also pointed out that it would only intervene if its deployment was authorized by a law voted on in Congress, something impossible given the Peronist majority in both Houses. The Argentine military was unwilling to take the blame if violence grew worse, learning from what had previously happened when President Isabel Perón issued an executive order commanding them to fight the subversive guerrilla movements of the 1970s, culminating in the Dirty War.

With military intervention no longer an option, De la Rúa resorted to declare a state of siege (essentially a state of emergency) throughout the country, deploying the Federal Police, National Gendarmerie (border guard), and Naval Prefecture (coast guard) to contain the growing violence.

Later that night, De la Rúa addressed the nation to announce the state of siege and call on the Peronists to negotiate a "government of national unity". Following the broadcast, spontaneous cacerolazos ("pot banging") took place throughout Buenos Aires and other major cities, signaling the middle-class' own unrest. 19 December concluded with the resignation of Domingo Cavallo, who had lost whatever support he had within the government. Groups of protesters mobilized throughout Buenos Aires, some of them arriving to Plaza de Mayo, where there were incidents with the Federal Police forces.

== 20 December ==
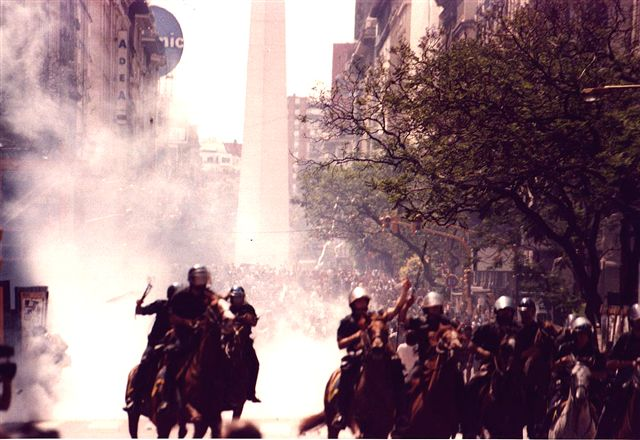
Police intervention in the conflict

What had begun as rioting by unemployed and leftist-leaning groups had turned into a middle-class protest with the cacerolazos, and the resignation of Cavallo did nothing to calm the situation. The De la Rúa administration had agreed with the military to participate in an emergency handout of food, however, the plan failed due to lack of cooperation from the Ministry of Social Development.

Throughout the morning, groups of protesters converged on Plaza de Mayo despite the state of siege. The Federal Police, acting under orders from the government, proceeded to try to control the protests. An attempt by a federal judge to halt police operations was disregarded, and the situation worsened with the arrival of new groups of protesters.

As violence expanded, President De la Rúa tried to impose censorship on all news outlets from Buenos Aires. The idea was to use the state of siege to force the television networks to stop transmitting current events and broadcast emergency programming. This plan also failed because De la Rúa's own Media Secretary refused to carry out his instructions. The state's repression was thus broadcast both within Argentina and abroad, causing further mobilizations toward the Plaza.

Violent incidents between the police and protesters spread throughout the country. The most notorious ones took place at the Plaza de Mayo, where five people were killed.

With his options steadily being reduced, De la Rúa went on national television at 4 p.m. to offer the Peronists to join the government and try to bring some peace to the country. At that time, a caucus of Peronist governors was taking place at a country villa in the province of San Luis. Three hours later, Humberto Roggero, head of the Peronist bloc of the House of Deputies, announced that the Peronist Party would not be a part of a "government of national unity".

When he heard the Peronists' response, De la Rúa decided to resign from office. The situation on the Plaza de Mayo (in front of the Casa Rosada, the Presidential Palace) was still too violent for De la Rúa to leave by car to his official residence at Olivos. Thus, the President's security detail decided to take him out of the Casa Rosada on board an Air Force helicopter. The iconic images of De la Rúa's "escape" by helicopter were broadcast throughout the country. The violence slowly abated. By the end of the day, 26 people had died, five of them in Buenos Aires.

With Álvarez having resigned a year earlier, the President Pro-Tempore of the Senate, Ramón Puerta, took over as Interim President until Congress could appoint a successor to De la Rúa.

=== Victims and criminal investigation ===
All told, 36 people were killed by police forces during the December riots, including 7 children. The largest incidence of violence was in the Plaza de Mayo of Buenos Aires, in what would become known in Argentina as the "Plaza de Mayo Massacre" (Spanish: Masacre de Plaza de Mayo), where 5 people were killed and 227 were injured. These crimes were investigated and brought to court. Seventeen people were charged with murder, attempted murder, including the then-Secretary of Security Enrique Mathov and the former head of the Argentine Federal Police, Rubén Santos.

While various officials and police officers have been charged and sentenced to prison, as of 2016, the majority of cases pertaining to violence during the December riots had not moved forward.

== Rodríguez Saá Administration ==
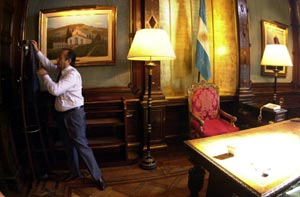
Adolfo Rodríguez Saá at his office in the Casa Rosada

According to the Acephaly Act, Puerta would only be president until the Legislative Assembly (a joint session of the Senate and the House of Deputies) convened and appointed a new president from either one member of Congress or a provincial governor to complete the resigning President's period.

The Peronist governors assembled at San Luis - arguably the most powerful men in Argentina at the period - were divided on whom to nominate. There were three "natural candidates", who were the governors of the three largest provinces: Carlos Ruckauf of Buenos Aires, José Manuel de la Sota of Córdoba, and Carlos Reutemann of Santa Fe. As a temporary arrangement, the governors decided to nominate Adolfo Rodríguez Saá, Governor of San Luis. The Peronists' easy majority in both houses of Congress ensured that Rodríguez Saá was elected on 22 December.

While de la Rúa's term expired in 2003, some argued that only a president legitimated by popular vote would be able to bring Argentina out of the crisis. To that end, Rodríguez Saá was designated as interim president for only three months, until presidential elections were held on 3 March. If needed, a ballotage would be held on 17 March. The winner would take office on 5 April for the balance of de la Rúa's term.

However, Rodríguez Saá did not seem at all satisfied with being a caretaker president. From the first moment, Rodríguez Saá embarked on ambitious projects aimed at giving him popularity. In his inaugural speech, he announced that Argentina would default on its foreign debt, an announcement received by rousing applause from the members of Congress. He then proceeded to announce the issuing of a "third currency" (alongside both the peso and dollar) to boost consumption. Later on, Rodríguez Saá announced that he would extradite every former military officer charged with human rights abuses during the Dirty War who was requested by foreign courts. Another measure was to end the state of siege.

There were also some unpopular designations to the Cabinet. The most notorious one was the appointment of former Mayor of Buenos Aires Carlos Grosso, arguably one of the most corrupt figures in Argentine politics. Rodríguez Saá also courted the powerful Peronist trade unions in a move that was recognized as an attempt to wrestle power from the other Peronist governors.

New riots and cacerolazos took place in Buenos Aires, with some protesters entering the Congress Palace and burning furniture. On 30 December, Rodríguez Saá called for a summit of Peronist governors at the Presidential holiday retreat of Chapadmalal, 19 kilometres (12 miles) south of Mar del Plata. Of the fourteen Peronist governors, only five attended. Realizing that he lacked support from his own party, Rodríguez Saá returned to his home province to announce his own resignation from the Presidency after barely a week in office.

== Designation of Eduardo Duhalde ==
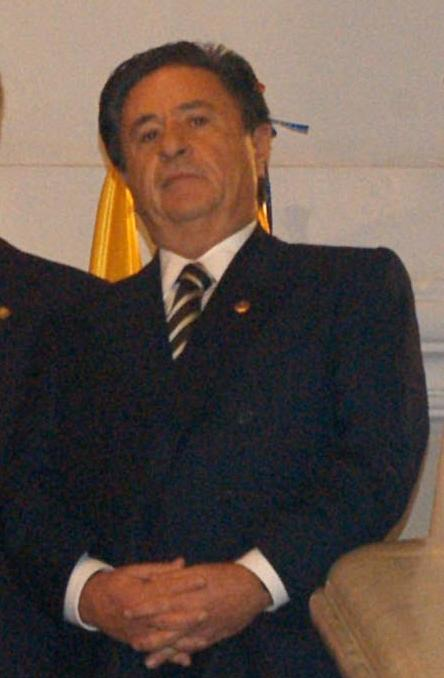
Former President Eduardo Duhalde (2002–2003)

Ramón Puerta refused to take over as interim President again, resigning as President Pro-Tempore of the Senate. With no President, Vice President or President Pro-Tempore of the Senate, the Presidency of Argentina was placed in the hands of the next-in-line: Eduardo Camaño, the Speaker of the House of Deputies.

Camaño was to take over until a new Legislative Assembly was convened. The Assembly convened on 1 January 2002, and debated extensively before designating Senator Eduardo Duhalde as president almost at midnight.

Duhalde was one of the top leaders of the Peronist Party. However, many had thought that Duhalde's political career was ruined after his defeat in the 1999 presidential elections. In an ironic twist of events, Duhalde was called to complete the term of the man who beat him in the elections, Fernando de la Rúa. This was not to be a provisional presidency, as Duhalde was designated to complete the interrupted term of De la Rúa until the 2003 presidential elections.

With regard to the economy Duhalde and his Economy Minister Jorge Remes Lenicov decided on an even more extreme freezing of the bank deposits, which was then coupled with the so-called pesificación ("peso-ification", a forced transformation of all dollar-denominated accounts into pesos at an arbitrary fixed exchange rate), and a regulated devaluation. The fixed exchange rate system was abandoned soon afterward, which was followed by a large depreciation.

== Social changes ==
During the unrest millions of people formed neighbourhood assemblies, occupied unused land and factories, created barter and mutual aid networks, implemented workers' self-management across hundreds of factories and rejected trade unionism and political parties. Around a third of the population participated in these creations and these efforts have been repeatedly praised by anarchists.

== Documentary ==
- De la Rúa's resignation is shown at Jorge Batlle: entre el cielo y el infierno, a 2024 documentary directed by Federico Lemos.

== See also ==
- 1989 riots in Argentina
- List of cases of police brutality in Argentina

== Sources ==
- Reato, Ceferino (2015). Doce noches [Twelve nights] (in Spanish). Argentina: Sudamericana. ISBN 978-950-07-5203-9.
- "Argentina in state of siege after deadly riots". CNN.com. 20 December 2001.
- "Argentina teeters on possible economic collapse". CNN.com. 21 December 2001. Archived from the original on 24 October 2007.
- "The events that triggered Argentina's crisis". BBC News - Business. 21 December 2001.
- Javier Auyero, Timothy Patrick Moran. "The Dynamics of Collective Violence: Dissecting Food Riots in Contemporary Argentina" (PDF). Department of Sociology, State University of New York – Stony Brook. Archived from the original (PDF) on 15 June 2007.
- Mark Ellis-Jones (April 2003). "States of unrest III: Resistance to IMF and World Bank policies in poor countries: Argentina". World Development Movement. Archived from the original on 9 November 2005.
