= Banco de la Nación Argentina =

Argentine national bank

Coordinates: 34°36′26″S 58°22′17″W

Bank of the Argentine Nation

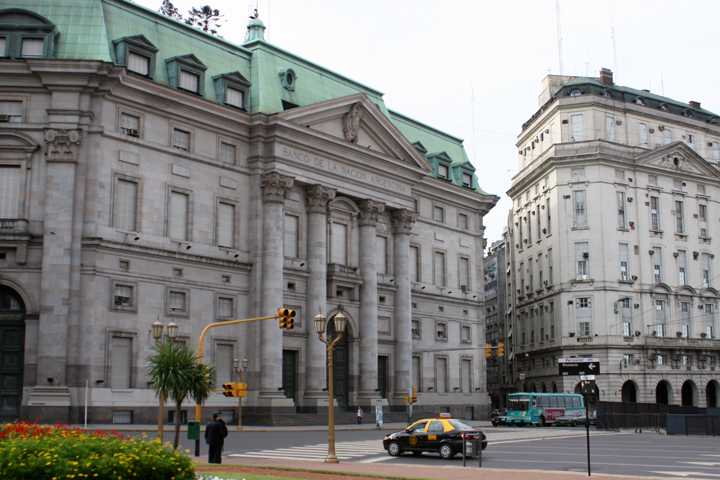
- Headquarters main facade as seen in 2005
- Native name: Banco de la Nación Argentina
- Company type: Public bank
- Industry: insurance
- Founded: 18 October 1891; 134 years ago
- Founder: Carlos Pellegrini
- Headquarters: Buenos Aires, Argentina
- Number of locations: Domestic: 735 branches; Overseas: 15 branches
- Area served: International
- Key people: Daniel Tillard (president)
- Services: Retail Banking; Business finance; Trade finance; Factoring; Mutual funds; Pension funds; Insurance; Mortgage loans; Consumer Finance; Credit cards
- Revenue: ▲US$ 5.1 billion (2010–2011)
- Net income: ▲US$ 1.1 billion (2010–2011)
- Total assets: ▲US$ 36.7 billion (2011)
- Number of employees: 16,519 (2011)
- Parent: Grupo Banco Nación
- Website: www.bna.com.ar

Banco de la Nación Argentina (BNA; lit. 'Bank of the Argentine Nation') is the largest bank in Argentina's banking sector.

== History ==
The Bank of the Argentine Nation was founded on 18 October 1891 by President Carlos Pellegrini, with the purpose of stabilizing the nation's finances following the Panic of 1890; its first director was Vicente Lorenzo Casares. In its early decades it became a leading financing source for agricultural smallholders, and later for commercial and industrial businesses, as well as handling an array of public sector transactions.

The bank's reputation suffered after it was revealed that bribes had been received by the board of directors in 1994 when contacting IBM for the supply of computers, software, and communication equipment, becoming a prominent political scandal at the time.

== Services ==
Long a significant supplier of domestic lending in a credit-tight economy, the bank attempted—with only partial success—to revive the local credit market during the tenure of Gabriela Ciganotto, who stated the main goal of the bank in her inauguration speech in 2006 as "putting [the bank] at the service of production, especially small and medium businesses, and not of speculation."

In December 2006 the bank ranked 278th in the world in terms of tier one capital (US$ 1.623 billion, or 11% of deposits in December 2006) according to a global survey of top 1000 world banks carried out by The Banker, a Financial Times publication. Domestically, it has long been Argentina's largest bank; in December 2011 it maintained 626 branches, US$30 billion in deposits (28% of the domestic total), and a loan portfolio of US$15 billion (20% of the domestic total). Its lending profile is less oriented toward consumer or mortgage lending than other leading banks in Argentina; one third of its outstanding credit is to the public sector and 80% of the remainder is allocated to commercial loans. The public bank is giving to the people divers credit such as UVA credit for house mortgage.

== Headquarters ==
The bank's headquarters are located in the San Nicolás neighborhood of Buenos Aires on the site of the Teatro Colón's first building, bought by the national government in 1888 and later designated as main offices of the recently founded institution. The edifice was remodeled in 1910 by architect Adolfo Büttner to better suit its new role as a bank venue.

In 1938 architect Alejandro Bustillo presented a new design for a much larger building in a revivalist, French-influenced, Monumental Neoclassical style. These new 100,000 m^{2} (1,100,000 sq ft) headquarters were built in two stages between 1940 and 1955. This building is also home to the Alejandro Bustillo Art Gallery, established in 1971, as well as to a historic and numismatic museum.

Architectural evolution of the headquarters of the Bank of the Argentine Nation

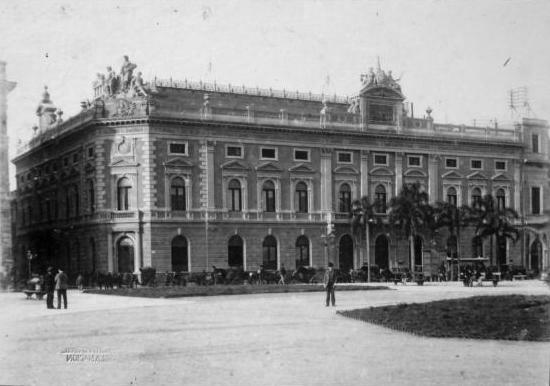
Original building of the Teatro Colón c. 1880

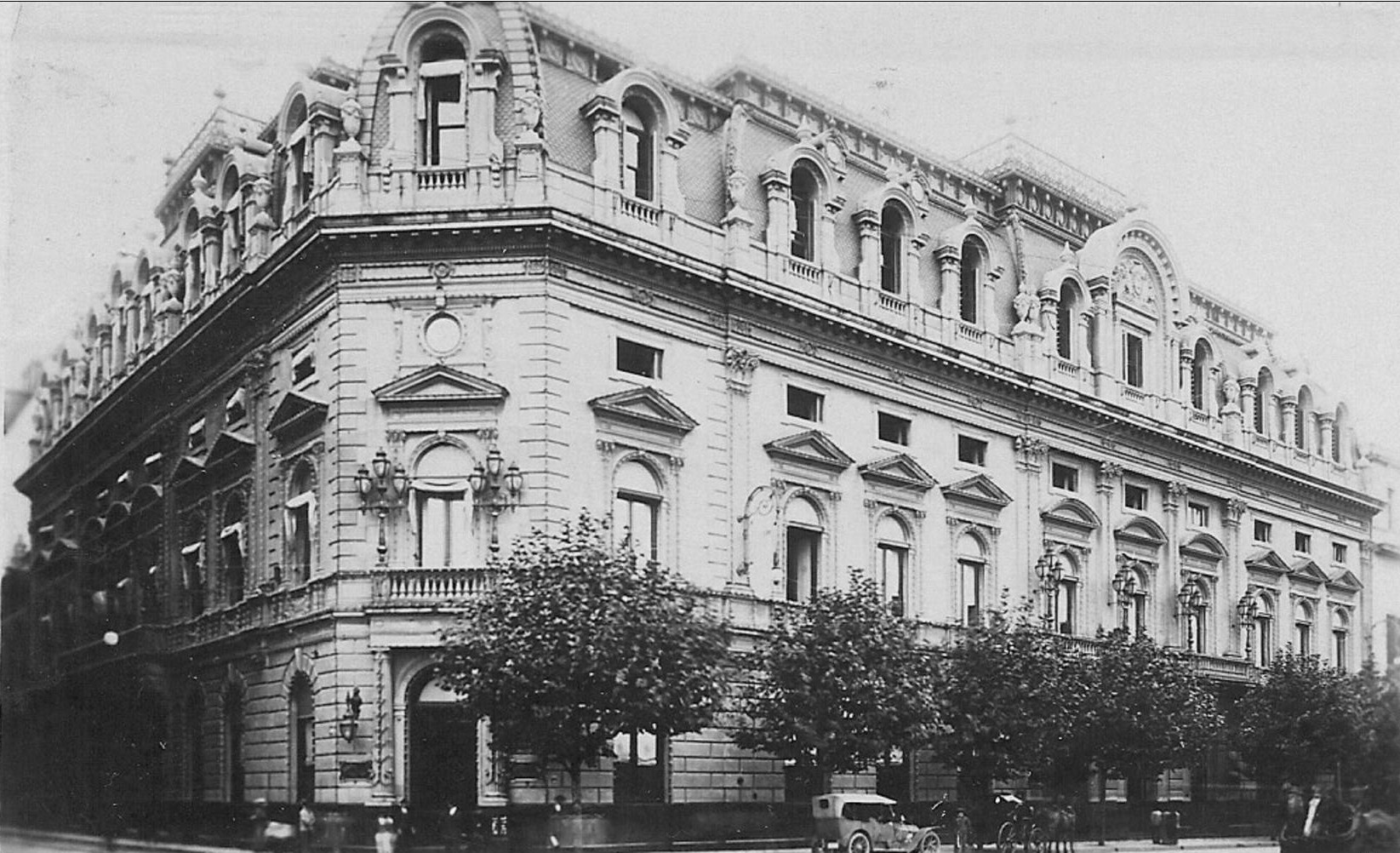
Adolfo Büttner's remodel in 1910

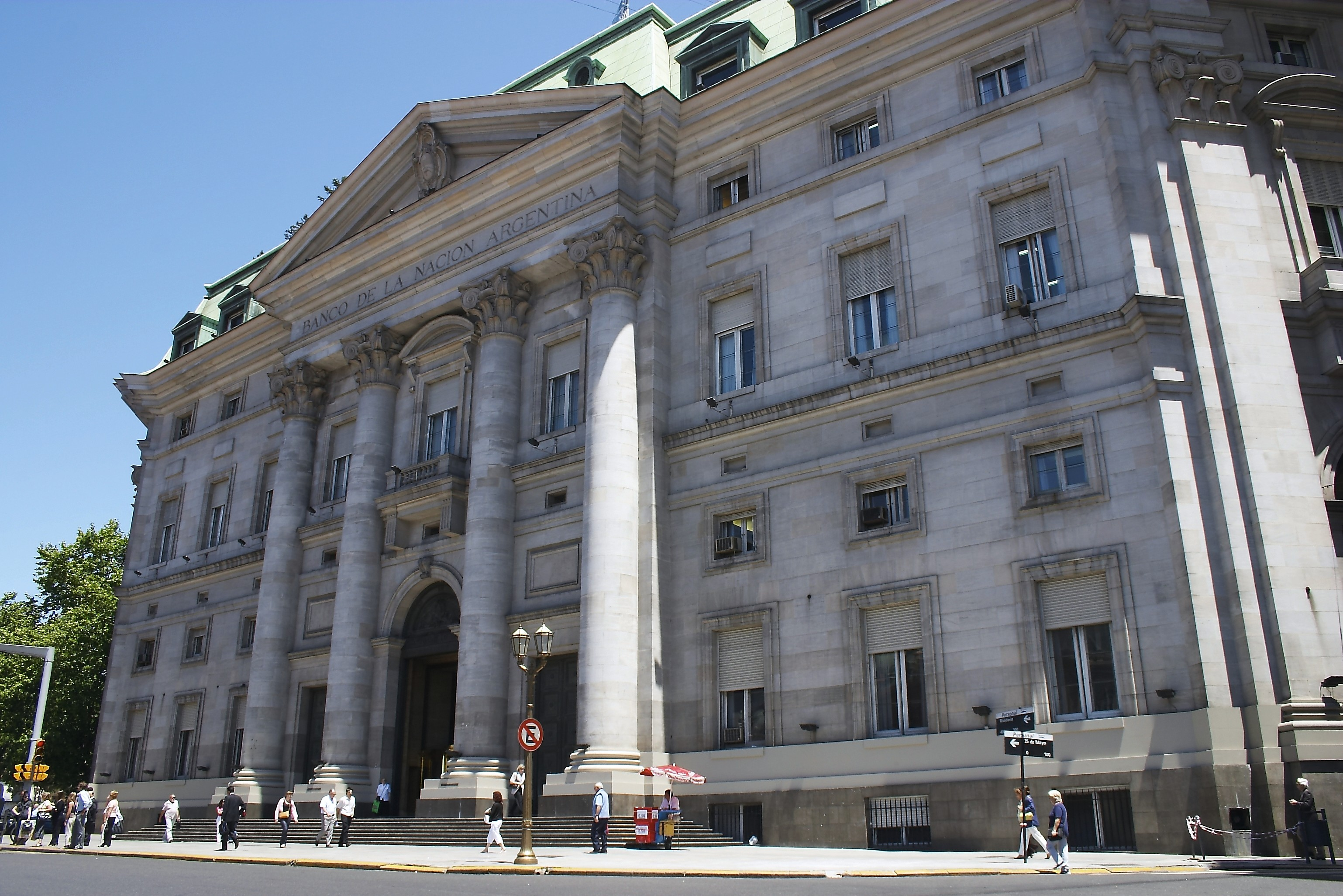
Current Neoclassical building by Alejandro Bustillo

== Branches ==
In December 2011 the bank maintained 626 branches throughout Argentina, and 15 more overseas (Santa Cruz de la Sierra, Bolivia; Rio de Janeiro and São Paulo, Brazil; Georgetown, Cayman Islands; Santiago, Chile; Paris; Tokyo; Panama City; Asunción, Paraguay; Madrid; London; New York City and Miami; Montevideo, Uruguay; and Caracas, Venezuela), along with a representative office in Porto Alegre, Brazil. It employed 16,519 people in Argentina, and more than 200 abroad.

Selected branches of the Bank of the Argentine Nation

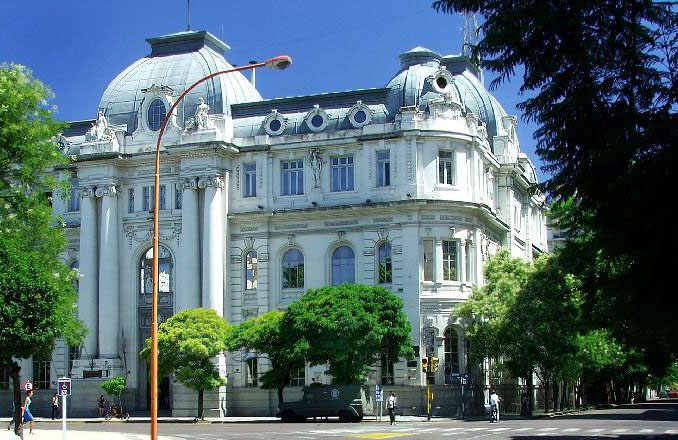
Bahía Blanca, Buenos Aires

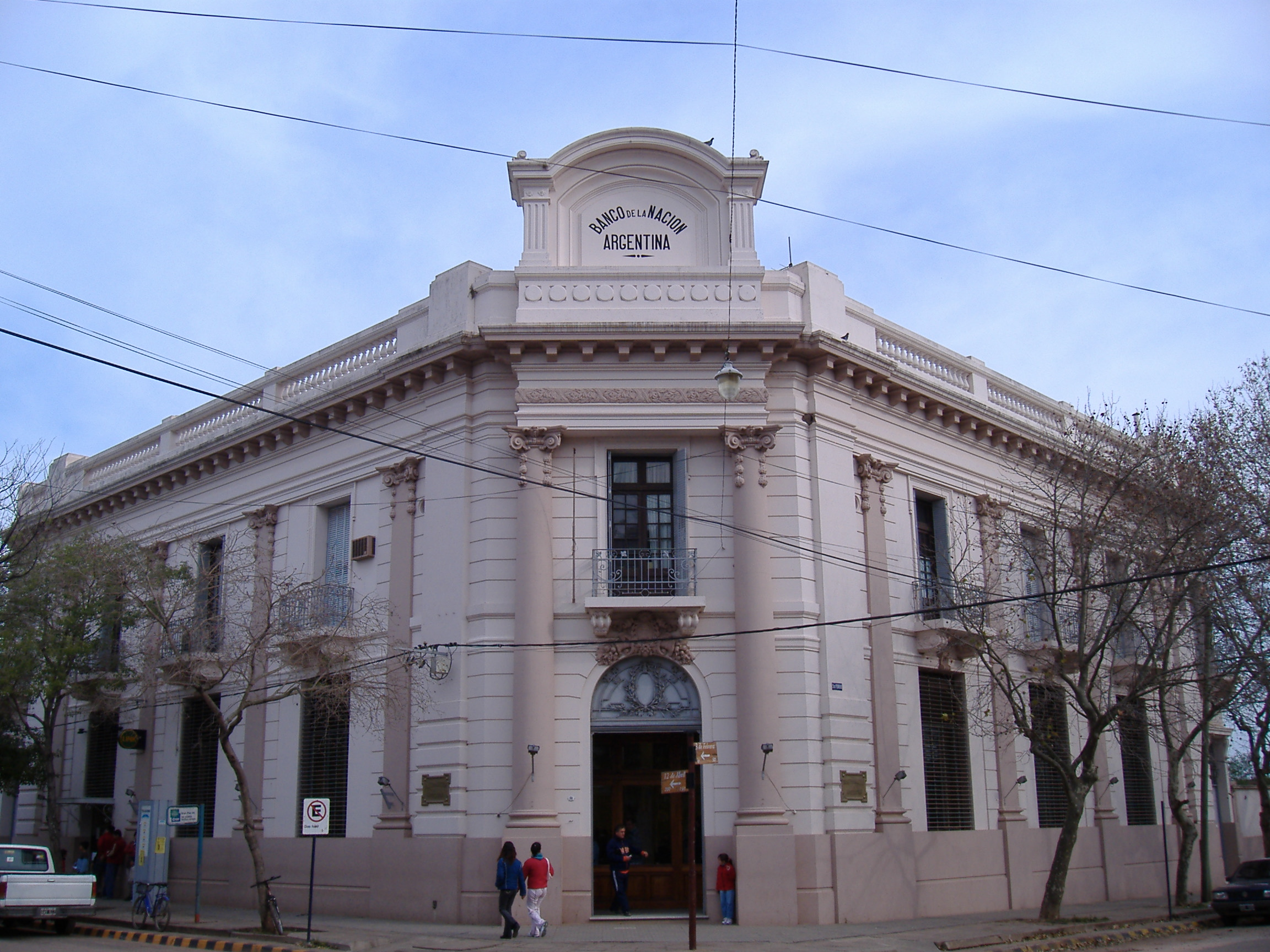
Colón, Entre Ríos

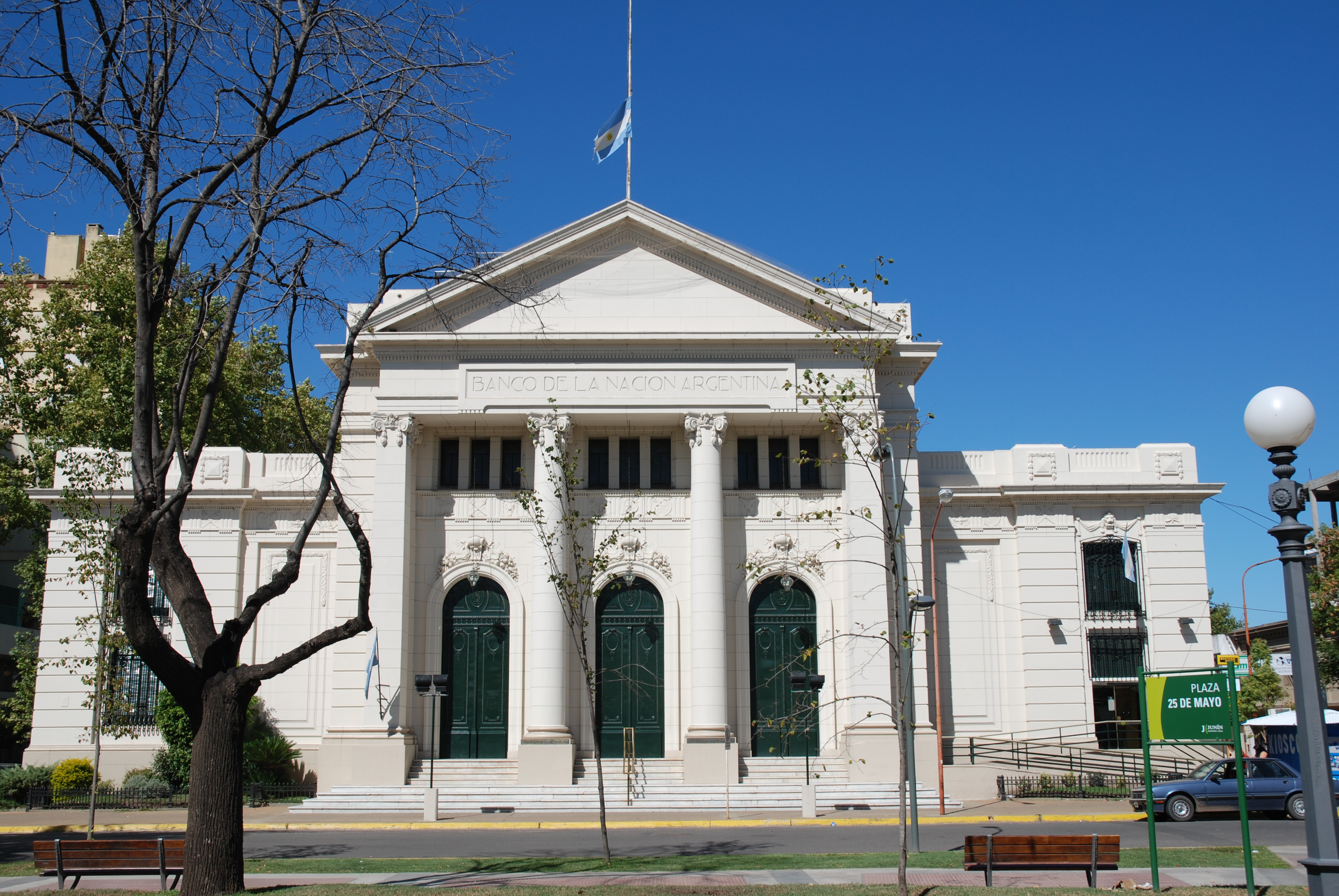
Junín, Buenos Aires

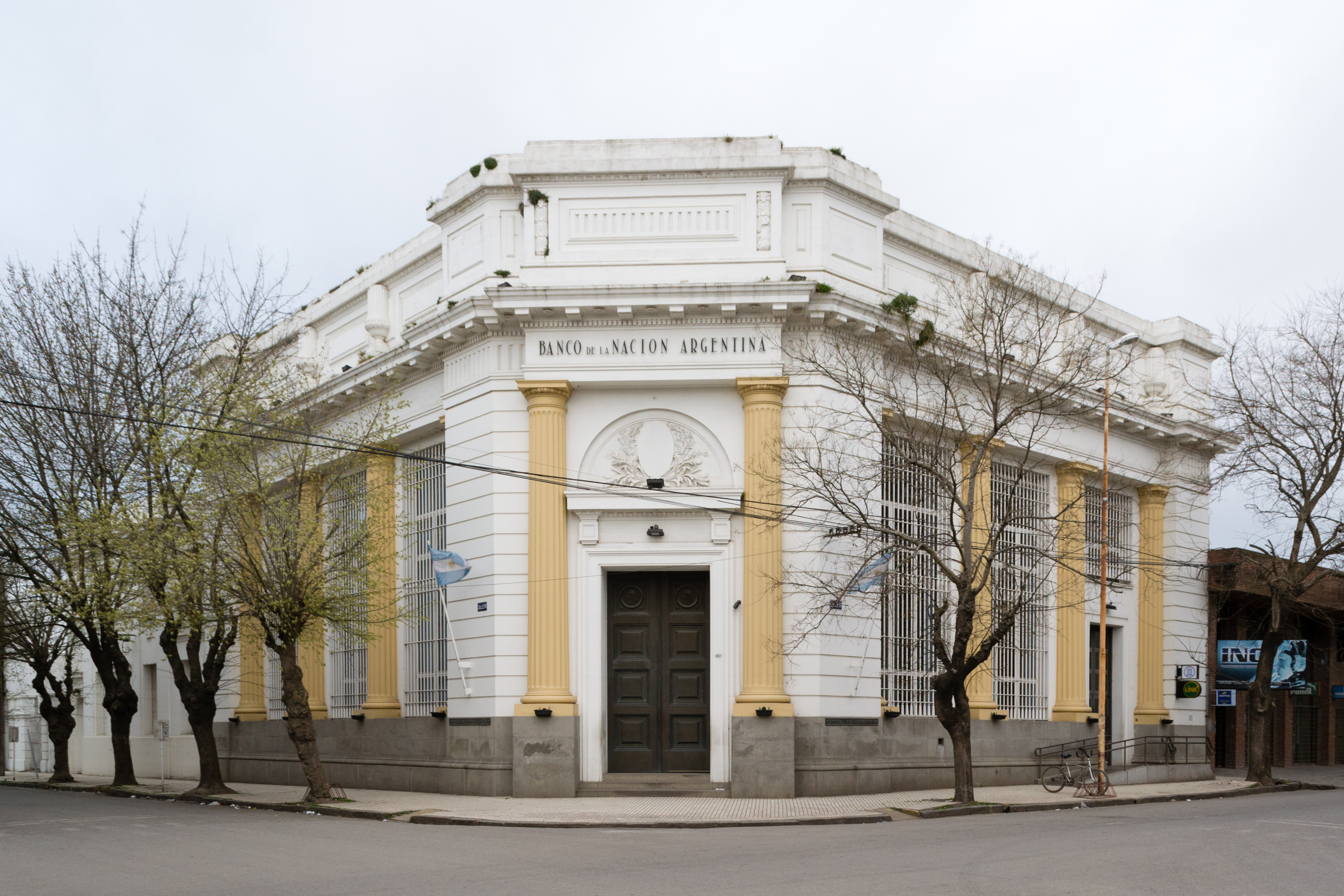
Balcarce, Buenos Aires

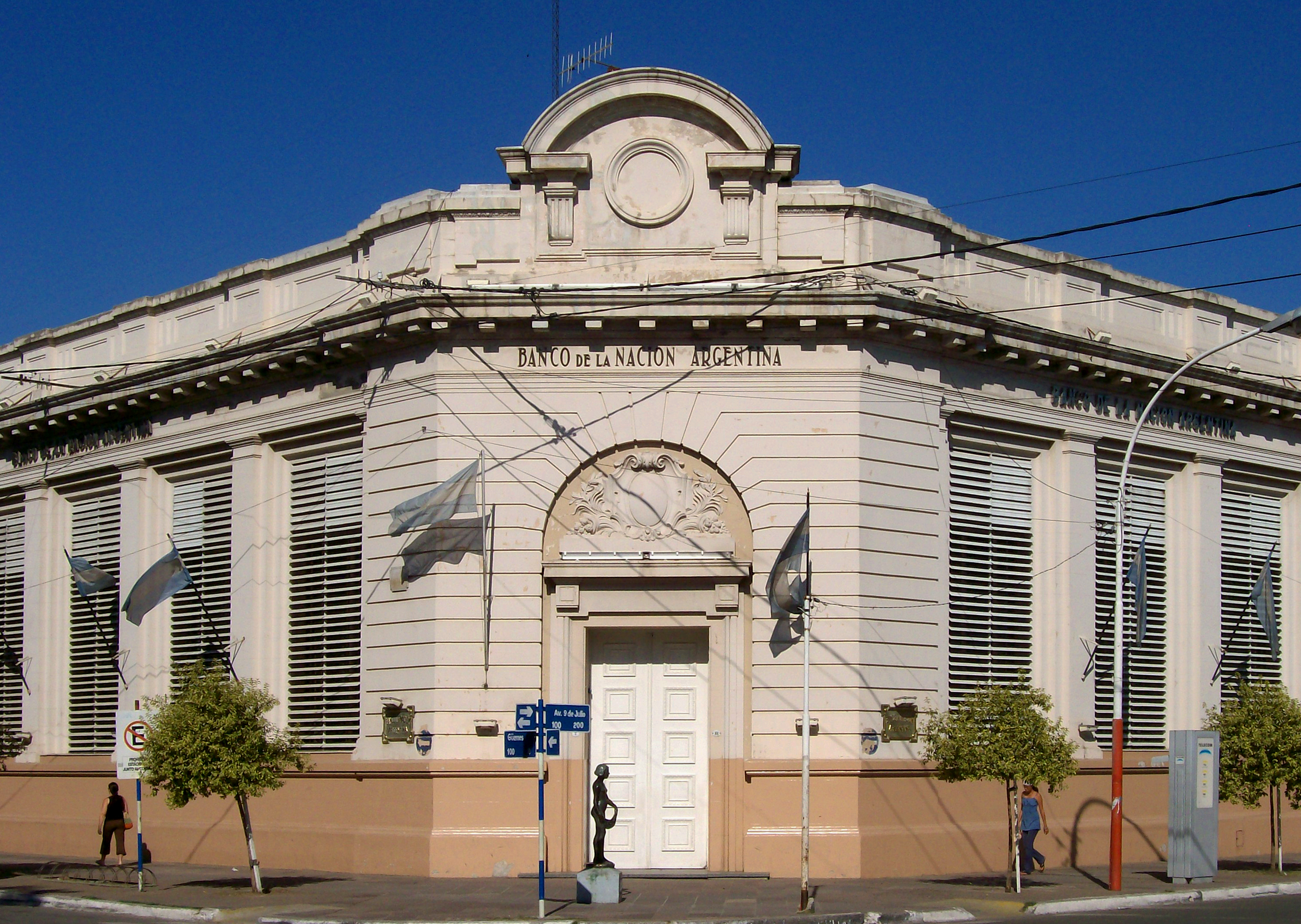
Resistencia, Chaco

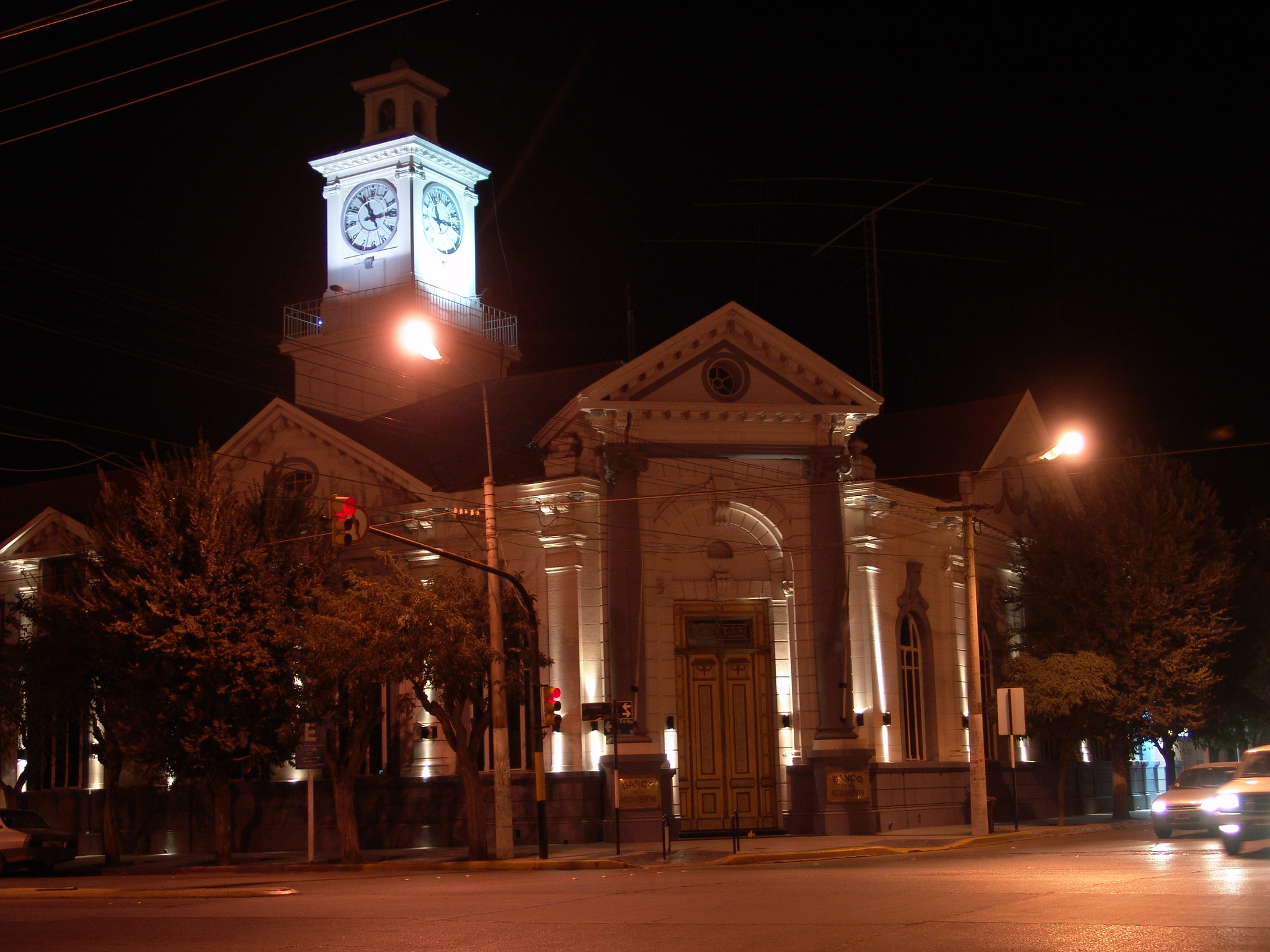
Trelew, Chubut

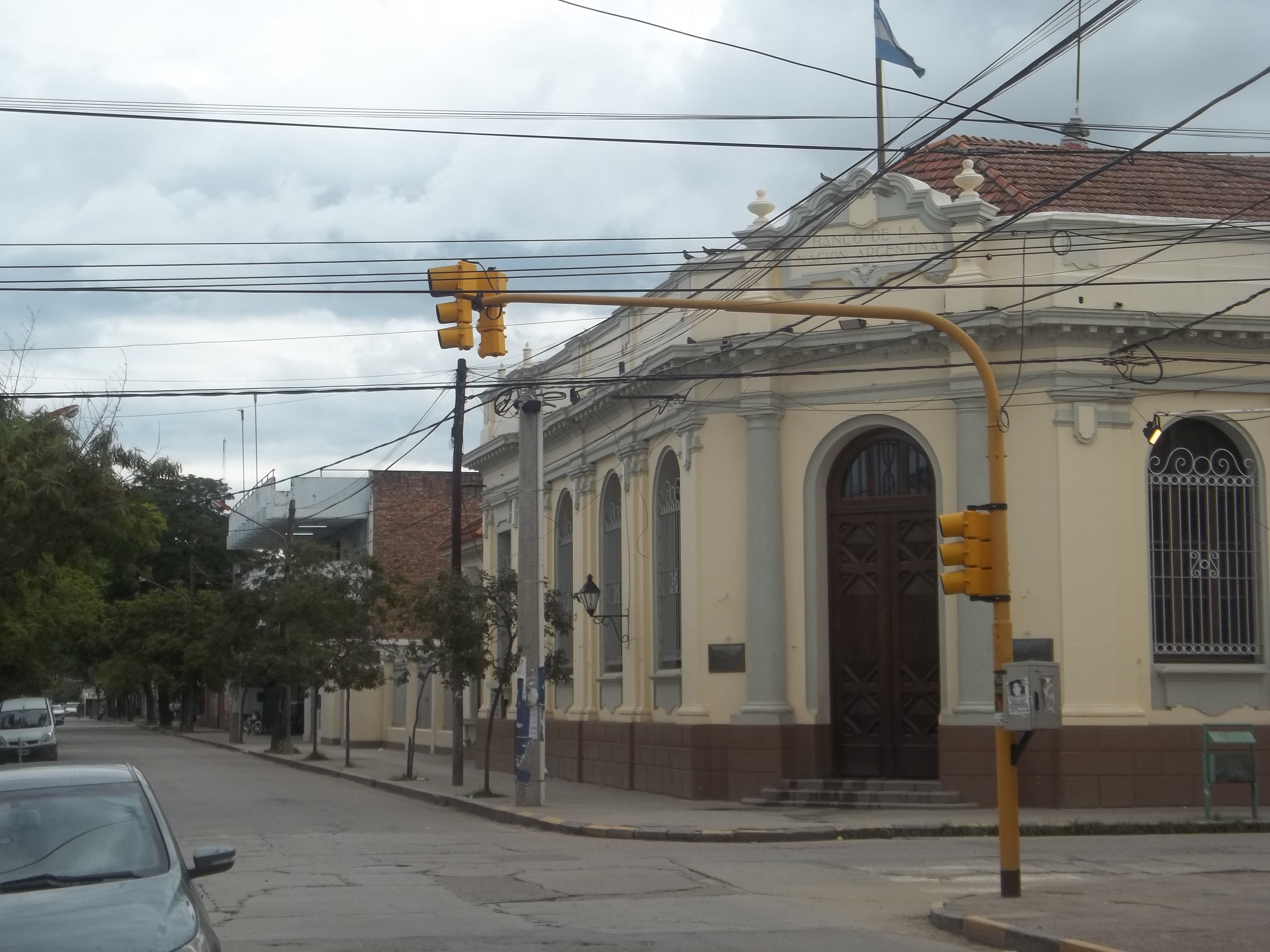
Orán, Salta

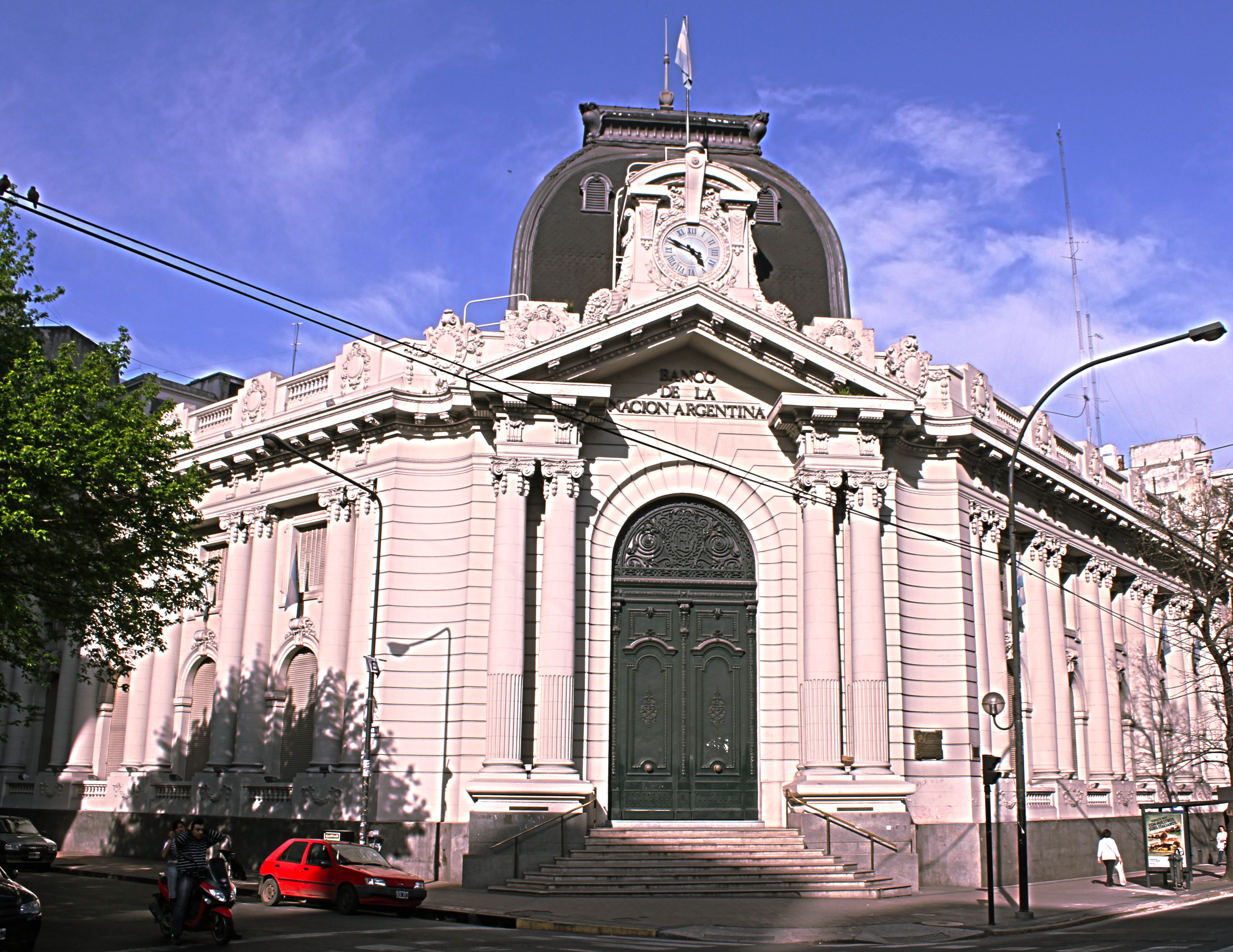
La Plata, Buenos Aires

== See also ==
- Club Banco Nación
