= Corralito =

2001 austerity measures in the Argentine financial crisis

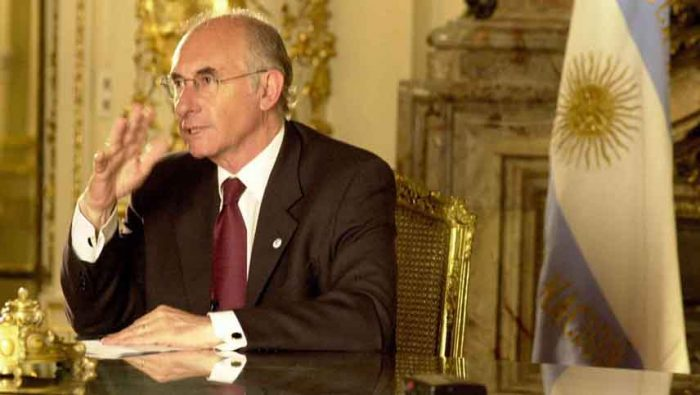
Fernando De la Rúa

Corralito (Spanish pronunciation: [koraˈlito]) is the informal name for the economic measures taken in Argentina at the end of 2001 by Minister of Economy Domingo Cavallo in order to stop a bank run which implicated a limit of cash withdrawals of 250 ARS per week (at that time US$1 = 1 ARS). Electronic transfers and credit and debit card payments were not disrupted.

The Spanish word corralito is the diminutive form of corral, which means "corral, animal pen, enclosure"; the diminutive is used in the sense of "small enclosure" and in Argentina also "a child's playpen". This expressive name alludes to the restrictions imposed by the measure. The term was coined by journalist Antonio Laje.

== Background and initial measures ==
1998–2002 Argentine
great depression
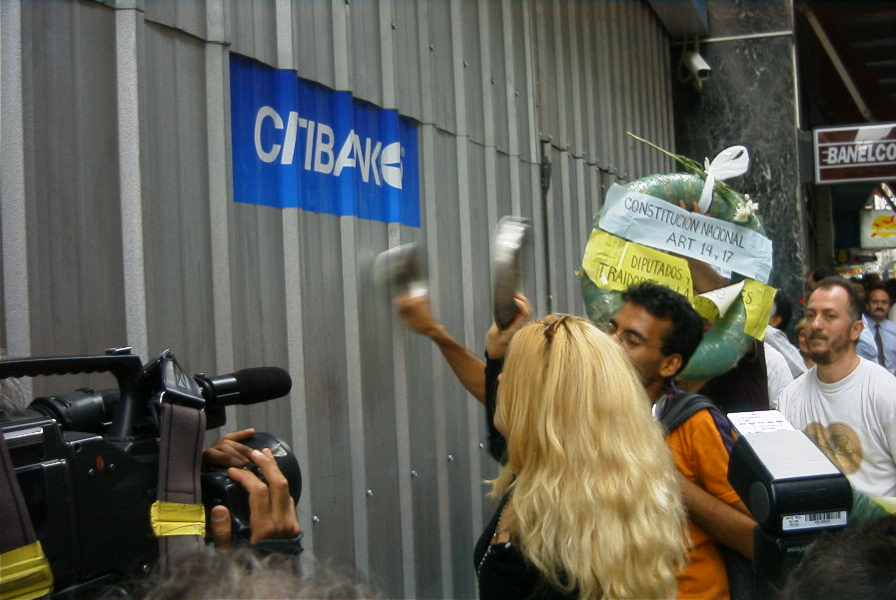

Economy of Argentina
Argentine peso
Convertibility plan
Corralito
Corralón
Cacerolazo
2001 riots
Apagón
Economic emergency law
Debt restructuring

In 2001, Argentina was in the midst of an economic crisis: heavily indebted, with an economy in complete stagnation (an almost three-year-long recession), and the exchange rate fixed at one U. S. dollar per Argentine peso by law, which made exports uncompetitive and effectively deprived the state of having an independent monetary policy. Many Argentines, but most especially companies, fearing an economic crash and possibly a devaluation, were transforming pesos to dollars and withdrawing them from the banks in large amounts, usually transferring them to foreign accounts (capital flight).

On December 1, 2001, in order to stop this draining from destroying the banking system, the government froze all bank accounts, initially for 90 days. Only a small amount of cash was allowed for withdrawal on a weekly basis (initially 250 Argentine pesos, then 300), and only from accounts denominated in pesos. No withdrawals were allowed from accounts denominated in U.S. dollars, unless the owner agreed to convert the funds into pesos. Operations using credit cards, debit cards, cheques and other means of payment could be conducted normally, but the lack of cash availability caused numerous problems for both the general public and businesses.

== Immediate effects ==
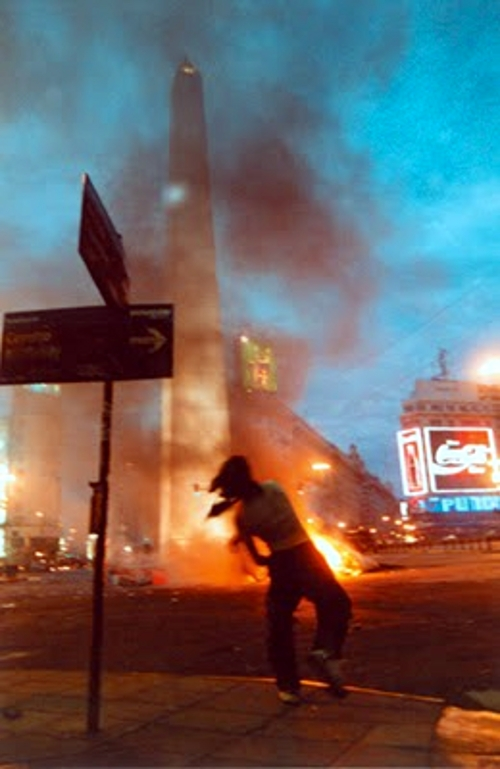
Riots in Buenos Aires. December 2001

At the time, the average Argentine did not employ the banking system for daily uses; many did not have personal bank accounts, and dealt only in cash. Debit cards were not popular and many businesses did not have the equipment to accept them. Thus the cash restrictions only exacerbated the recession and angered the public. President Fernando de la Rúa resigned on 20 December 2001 after violent riots, but the restrictions of the corralito were not lifted at the time.

== Role of banks ==
It is generally agreed that the banks had a share of the blame for the situation that led to the corralito. In mid-2001, it was probably clear to bank owners and high-ranking officials that Argentina's banking system was going to crash, and some in fact may have spurred this outcome by letting their highest deposit holders know this news. These, mostly large companies, quickly moved their deposits abroad. Meanwhile, they continued to recommend their middle-class customers to enter deposits.

== Transition to corralón ==
After Eduardo Duhalde assumed the presidency, US denominated debt and deposits were forcibly exchanged for Argentine pesos at 1.4 pesos per dollar for deposits and 1.0 for debt. The exchange rate spiked to 4 ARS/USD. The corralito was renamed corralón, as people could not longer withdraw $250 per week, not because of new limits, but because they no longer had any dollars. Protests increased, and banks were closed for months.

It is also believed that in the end the corralito ended up being good business for some international banks since they negotiated with the Argentine government to receive compensation bonds for the "missing" money, which in a large proportion had never actually left their banks, but simply moved from one branch to another.

Most banks stayed in the country during the crisis, withstanding severe damage to their reputations, as well as (in certain cases) physical attacks. Others fled as soon as problems arose (for example, Scotiabank's Argentine branch, Scotiabank Quilmes).

== See also ==
- Plano Collor - a similar measure taken in Brazil
- Cacerolazo
- Corralón
- Fractional-reserve banking
- Third World debt
