= Corralón =

2002 economic measures in the Argentine financial crisis

Corralón was the informal name for the economic measures taken in Argentina at the beginning of 2002 by President Eduardo Duhalde during a bank run in which deposits and debts in dollars were exchanged to local currency at 1.4 per dollar for deposits and 1.0 for debt (this was also called pesificación asimétrica). Previously, the withdrawal of dollars was limited to $250 per week. After the forced exchanged, people no longer had any dollars in the system and those who had savings in dollars lost 65% of their deposited value.

== History ==
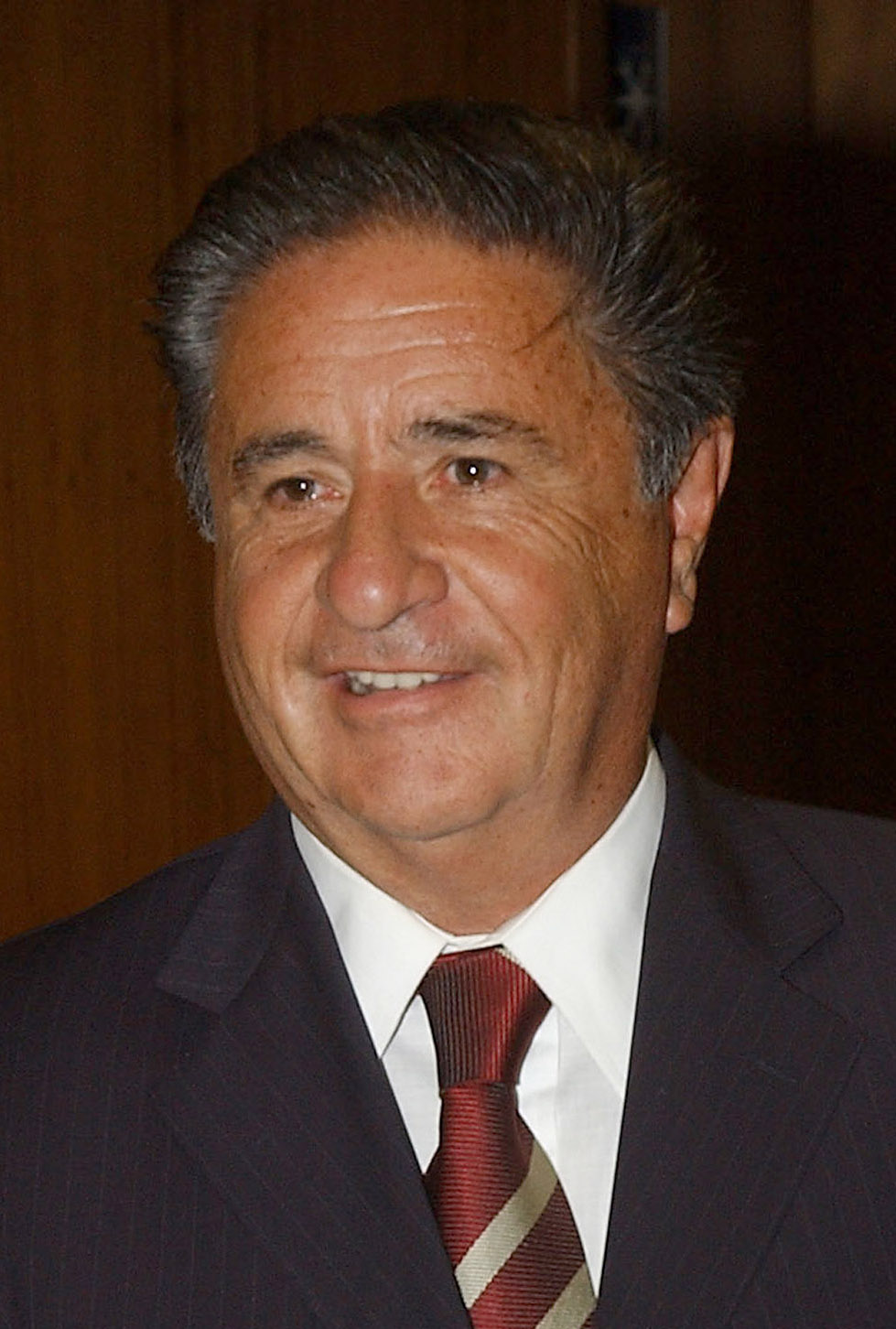
Eduardo Duhalde

Argentina's situation worsened for several months. The corralito was hardened during the interim rule of President Eduardo Duhalde and turned into a corralón ("big corral"). The corralón differed from the corralito in that most deposits were forcibly exchanged for a series of bonds denominated in pesos. The dollar-denominated accounts were automatically exchanged for pesos and peso bonds at a predetermined rate. The real necessity of such decision was questioned by several observers at the time, and some suggested this move benefited some large companies which were insolvent (or nearly so), whose owners had sent their dollars abroad before the corralito; these owners were thus able to repay their companies' now devalued debts by converting fewer dollars than it would have taken previously.

The peso was first devalued (from 1.0 to 1.4 pesos/dollar) and then floated, thereby quickly depreciating to a maximum rate of nearly 4 pesos per dollar. Argentina's economy then gradually began a recovery from its abysmal state, spurred by exports that benefited from the heightened exchange rate, and the declaration of default on most of its debt, which left the government with more money available to expand the economy.

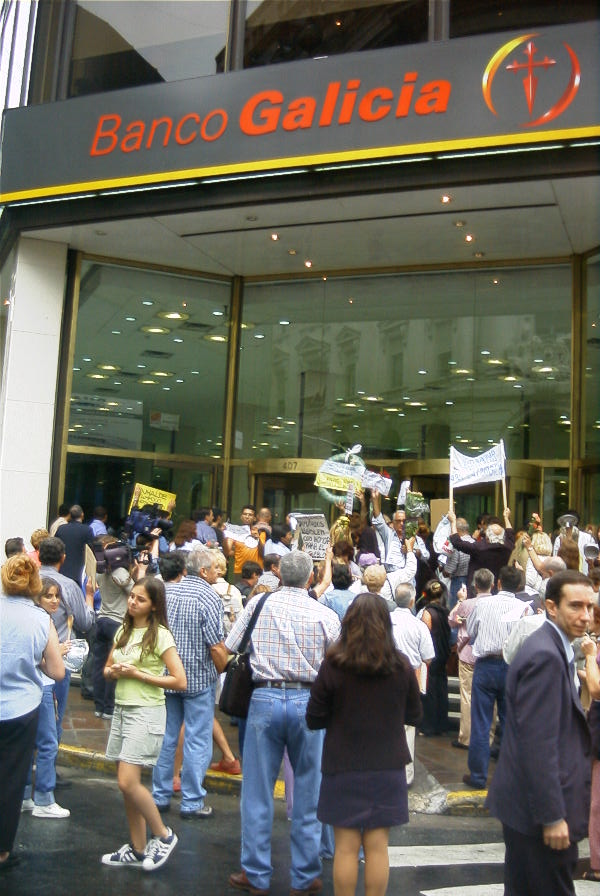
Depositors protesting frozen accounts for fear they might lose value, or worse. February 2002.

Many private enterprises and even the Province of Buenos Aires were favoured by this measure as they managed to decrease their debts. Nine years later, several people had not yet been able to recover their savings because of the slow pace of the justice system in Argentina. However, debtors were able to purchase properties and other items by paying their debts at the 1 to 1 exchange rate.

== See also ==
- Cacerolazo
- Corralito
- Fractional-reserve banking
