= List of political families in Argentina =

The following is a list of political families in Argentina.

== A ==
=== Abal Medina family ===
- Fernando Abal Medina (1947–1970), activist and co-founder of Montoneros. Brother of Juan Manuel Abal Medina (born 1945).
- Juan Manuel Abal Medina (born 1945), Secretary General of the Justicialist Party (1972–1974). Brother of Fernando Abal Medina.
  - Juan Manuel Abal Medina Jr. (born 1968), National Senator for Buenos Aires (2014–2017), Argentine Ambassador to Mercosur (2014), Chief of the Cabinet of Ministers (2011–2013). Son of Juan Manuel Abal Medina (born 1945) and Cristina Moldes.
- Nilda Garré (born 1945), National Deputy (2015–2019; 2001–2005; 1995–2000; 1973–1976), Argentine Ambassador to the Organization of American States (2013–2015) and to Venezuela (2005), Minister of Security (2010–2013), Minister of Defense (2005–2010). Co-founder of the Broad Front. Former wife of Juan Manuel Abal Medina (born 1945) (1973–1982).

=== Alfonsín family ===
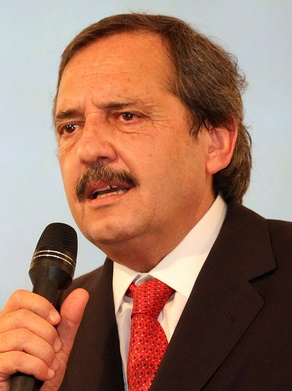
Ricardo Alfonsín (Argentine Ambassador to Spain since 2020), son of former president (1983–1989) Raúl Alfonsín.

- Raúl Alfonsín (1927–2009), National Senator for Buenos Aires (2001–2002), President of Argentina (1983–1989), National Deputy (1963–1966). President of the Radical Civic Union (1999–2001; 1993–1995; 1983–1991).
  - Ricardo Alfonsín (born 1951), Argentine Ambassador to Spain (2020-2023), National Deputy (2009–2017). Son of Raúl Alfonsín and María Lorenza Barreneche.

=== Alsogaray family ===
- Julio Rodolfo Alsogaray (1918–1994), Army General and Commander-in-Chief of the Argentine Army (1966–1968). Brother of Álvaro Alsogaray.
- Álvaro Alsogaray (1913–2005), National Deputy (1983–1989), Argentine Ambassador to the United States (1966–1968), Minister of Economy (1962; 1959–1961), Minister of Industry (1955–1956). Founder of the Union of the Democratic Centre. Brother of Julio Rodolfo Alsogaray.
  - María Julia Alsogaray (1942–2017), Secretary of Natural Resources and Human Environment (1991–1999), National Deputy (1985–1989). Daughter of Álvaro Alsogaray.

== B ==
=== Bullrich family ===
- Adolfo Bullrich (1833–1904), Mayor of Buenos Aires (1898–1902). Founder of the Casa Bullrich auction house.
  - Esteban Bullrich (born 1969), National Senator for Buenos Aires (since 2017), Minister of Education (2015–2017), National Deputy (2005–2010). Great-great-grandson of Adolfo Bullrich.
- Patricia Bullrich (born 1956), Minister of Security (since 2023; 2015–2019), National Deputy (2007–2015; 1993–1997), Minister of Social Security (2001), Ministry of Labour, Employment and Social Security (2000–2001). President of Republican Proposal (2020-2024). Great-great-great-niece of Adolfo Bullrich.

=== Bussi family ===
- Antonio Domingo Bussi (1926-2011), military General, Governor of Tucumán (1976-77, 1995-99).
  - Ricardo Bussi (b. 1964), National Deputy and Senator, son of Antonio Domingo Bussi.

=== Busti family ===
- Jorge Busti (1947-2021), Mayor of Concordia, National Deputy and Senator, Governor of Entre Ríos (1987-91, 1995-99, 2003-07).
- Cristina Cremer de Busti (b. 1949), National Deputy (2007-11), wife of Jorge Pedro Busti.

== C ==
=== Cafiero family ===
- Antonio Cafiero (1922–2014), National Senator for Buenos Aires (2002–2005; 1993–2001), Chief of the Cabinet of Ministers (2001–2002), Governor of Buenos Aires (1987–1991), National Deputy (1985–1987), Minister of Economy (1975–1976), Federal Interventor of Mendoza (1974–1975), Minister of International Trade (1952–1955). President of the Justicialist Party (1985–1990).
  - José Antonio Cafiero (born 1950), Argentine consul in Belo Horizonte, Brazil, career diplomat. Son of Antonio Cafiero.
    - Francisco Cafiero (born 1979), Secretary of Foreign Affairs of the Ministry of Defense (since 2019). Son of José Antonio Cafiero.
  - Juan Pablo Cafiero (born 1953), Argentine Ambassador to the Holy See (2008–2014), Minister of Social Development (2001–2002), National Deputy (1989–2001). Son of Antonio Cafiero.
    - Santiago Cafiero (born 1979), National Deputy (since 2023), Minister of Foreign Affairs and Worship (2021-2023), Chief of the Cabinet of Ministers (2019–2021). Son of Juan Pablo Cafiero.
  - Mario Cafiero (1966–2020), National Deputy (1997–2005). Vice president of Proyecto Sur. Son of Antonio Cafiero.

=== Cámpora family ===
- Héctor José Cámpora (1909–1980), President of Argentina (1973).
- Mario Cámpora (1930–2022), Argentine Ambassador to Belgium (1995–1999) and the United Kingdom (1990–1994), Secretary of Foreign Affairs (1989–1990). Nephew of Héctor José Cámpora.
- Lucía Cámpora (born 1990), Legislator of the City of Buenos Aires (since 2019), Vice President of the Buenos Aires University Federation (2018–2020). Grand-niece of Héctor José Cámpora.

=== Colombi family ===
- Arturo Colombi (b. 1958), governor of Corrientes (2005-09), cousin of Ricardo
- Ricardo Colombi (b. 1957), governor of Corrientes (2001-05, 2009-17), cousin of Arturo

== D ==
=== De la Rúa family ===
- Fernando de la Rúa (1937–2019), President of Argentina (1999–2001), Chief of Government of Buenos Aires (1996–1999). Brother of Jorge de la Rúa.
  - Antonio de la Rúa (born 1974), political advisor and campaign chief. Son of Fernando de la Rúa and Inés Pertiné Urien.
- Jorge de la Rúa (1942–2015), Minister of Justice (2000–2001), General Secretary of the Presidency (1999–2000). Brother of Fernando de la Rúa.

=== Di Tella family ===
- Torcuato Alfredo Sozio Di Tella (1917–1975), Argentine Ambassador to the Soviet Union (1974–1975). Nephew of Torcuato di Tella (1892–1948).
- Guido di Tella (1931–2001), Minister of Foreign Affairs, International Trade and Worship (1991–1999) and of Defense (1991), Argentine Ambassador to the United States (1989–1991), National Deputy (1987–1989). Son of Torcuato di Tella (1892–1948) and brother of Torcuato Salvador di Tella.
- Torcuato Salvador di Tella (1929–2016), Argentine Ambassador to Italy (2010–2016), Secretary of Culture (2003–2004). Son of Torcuato di Tella (1892–1948) and brother of Guido di Tella.

=== Duhalde family ===
- Eduardo Duhalde (born 1941), President of Argentina (interim, 2002–2003), National Senator for Buenos Aires (2001–2002), Governor of Buenos Aires (1991–1999), Vice President of Argentina (1989–1991), National Deputy (1987–1989), Mayor of Lomas de Zamora (1983–1987; 1974–1976). Husband of Hilda González de Dualde.
- Hilda "Chiche" González de Duhalde (born 1946), National Senator for Buenos Aires (2005–2011), First Lady of Argentina (2002–2003), National Deputy (1997–2005). Wife of Eduardo Duhalde.

== F ==
=== Frigerio family ===
- Rogelio Julio Frigerio (1914–2006), Secretary of Socio-Economic Relations (1958). Co-founder of the Integration and Development Movement (MID).
  - Octavio Frigerio (born 1938), National Deputy (1991–1993). Son of Rogelio Julio Frigerio.
    - Rogelio Frigerio (born 1970), Governor of Entre Ríos (since 2023), Minister of the Interior (2015–2019), President of the Bank of the City of Buenos Aires (2013–2015), Legislator of the City of Buenos Aires (2011–2013). Co-founder of Republican Proposal. Son of Octavio Frigerio.
  - Mario Enrique Frigerio (1949–2020), Undersecretary of Operational Planning and Logistic Service (2018–2020), Undersecretary of Defense Research, Development and Production (2017–2018). Son of Rogelio Julio Frigerio.
    - Federico Frigerio (born 1987), National Deputy (since 2017). Son of Mario Enrique Frigerio.

=== Frondizi family ===
- Arturo Frondizi (1908–1995), President of Argentina (1958–1962), National Deputy (1946–1951). Co-founder of the Intransigent Radical Civic Union (UCRI) and the Integration and Development Movement (MID). Brother of Silvio and Risieri Frondizi.
- Silvio Frondizi (1904–1974), Marxist intellectual and lawyer, assassinated by the Triple A. Brother of Arturo and Risieri Frondizi.
- Risieri Frondizi (1910–1985), Rector of the University of Buenos Aires (1957–1962). Brother of Arturo and Silvio Frondizi.

== G ==
=== Galmarini-Massa family ===
- Fernando Galmarini (born 1942), Secretary of Sports (1989–1995). Father of Sebastián and Malena Galmarini. Ex-husband of Marcela Durrieu.
- Marcela Durrieu (born 1951), former National Deputy. Mother of Sebastián and Malena Galmarini. Ex-wife of Fernando Galmarini.
  - Malena Galmarini (born 1975), President of Agua y Saneamientos Argentinos (2019-2023), Provincial Deputy of Buenos Aires (2019), City Councillor of Tigre (2009–2017). Daughter of Fernando Galmarini and Marcela Durrieu. Wife of Sergio Massa.
  - Sergio Massa (born 1972), Minister of Economy (2022-2023), President of the National Chamber of Deputies (2019-2022), National Deputy (2019-2022; 2013–2017), Mayor of Tigre (2009–2013; 2007–2008), Chief of the Cabinet of Ministers (2008–2009). Husband of Malena Galmarini.
  - Sebastián Galmarini (born 1978), Provincial Senator of Buenos Aires (2013–2017). Son of Fernando Galmarini and Marcela Durrieu.

== I ==
=== Ibarguren family ===
- Federico Ibarguren (1833–1890), Minister of the Supreme Court of Argentina (1884–1890), National Senator for Salta (1871–1874).
  - Carlos Ibarguren (1877–1956), Federal Interventor of Córdoba (1930–1931), Minister of Justice (1913–1914). Son of Federico Ibarguren and Magdalena Uriburu.

== J ==
=== Justo family ===
- Juan Bautista Justo (1865–1928), National Senator for the City of Buenos Aires (1924–1928), National Deputy (1912–1924). Founder of the Socialist Party. Husband of Alicia Moreau de Justo, brother of Sara Justo and second cousin of Agustín Pedro Justo (1841–1896).
- Alicia Moreau de Justo (1885–1986), suffragist and women's rights activist. Wife of Juan Bautista Justo.
- Sara Justo (1870–1941), women's rights activist. Sister of Juan Bautista Justo and second cousin of Agustín Pedro Justo (1841–1896).
- Agustín Pedro Justo (1841–1896), Governor of Corrientes (1871–1872). Second cousin of Juan Bautista and Sara Justo.
  - Agustín Pedro Justo (1876–1943), President of Argentina (1932–1938), Minister of War (1922–1928). Son of Agustín Pedro Justo (1841–1846).
    - Liborio Justo (1902–2003), Marxist activist. Son of Agustín Pedro Justo (1876–1943).

== K ==
=== Kirchner family ===
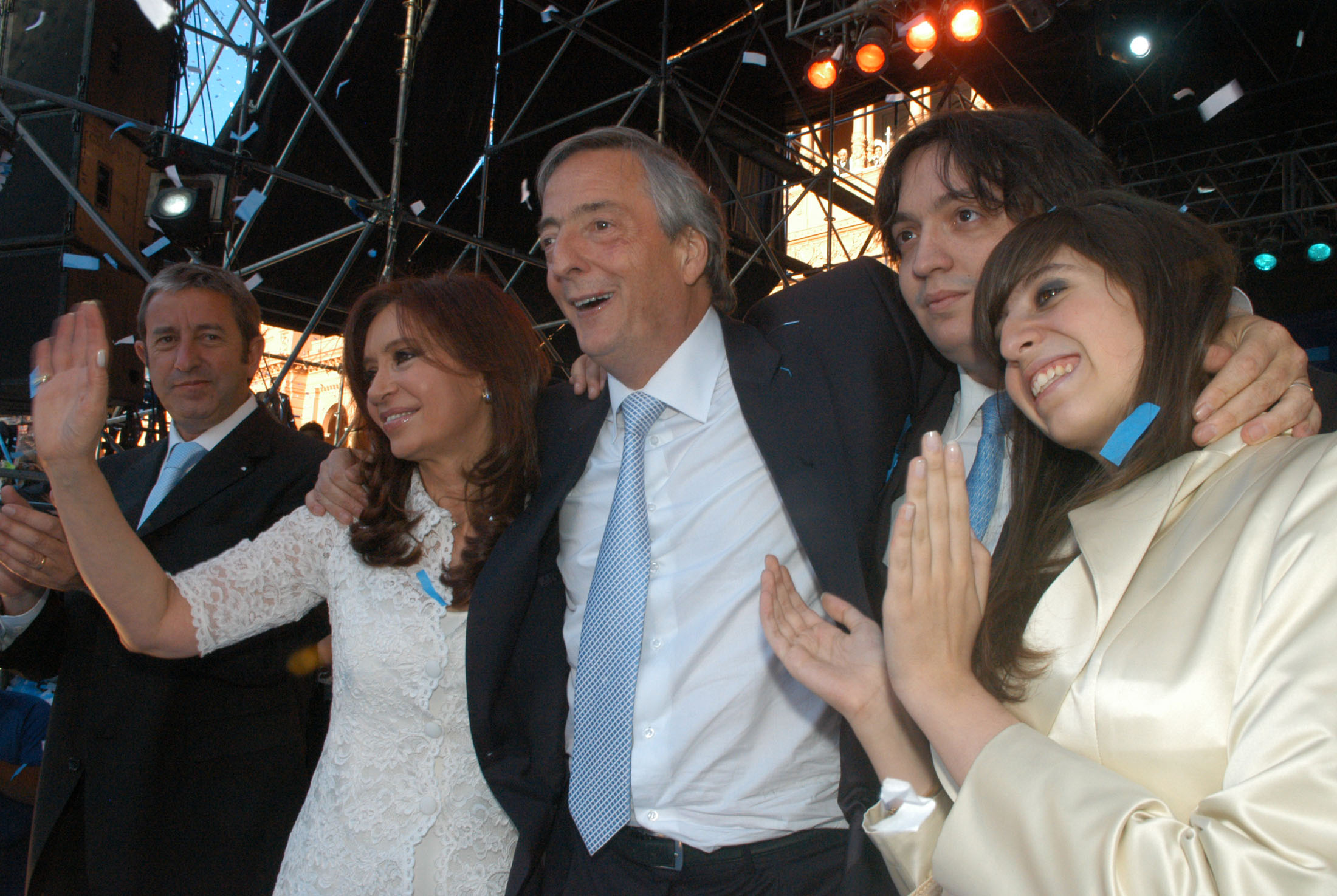
Cristina Fernández de Kirchner (president, 2007–2015), her husband Néstor Kirchner (president, 2003–2007) and their children, Máximo and Florencia, in 2007.

- Alicia Kirchner (born 1946), Governor of Santa Cruz (2015–2023), National Senator for Santa Cruz (2005–2006, since 2023), Minister of Social Development (2003–2004, 2005–2015). Founder of Kolina. Sister of Néstor Kirchner.
- Néstor Kirchner (1950–2010), First Gentleman of Argentina (2007–2010), National Deputy (2009–2010), President of Argentina (2003–2007), Governor of Santa Cruz (1991–2003), Mayor of Río Gallegos (1987–1991). Co-founder of the Front for Victory. Brother of Alicia Kirchner and husband of Cristina Fernández de Kirchner.
- Cristina Fernández de Kirchner (born 1953), Vice President of Argentina (2019–2023), National Senator for Buenos Aires (2005–2007, 2017–2019) and for Santa Cruz (1995–1997, 2001–2005), President of Argentina (2007–2015), First Lady of Argentina (2003–2007), National Deputy (1997–2001), Provincial Deputy of Santa Cruz (1989–1995). Widow of Néstor Kirchner.
  - Máximo Kirchner (born 1977), National Deputy for Santa Cruz (2015–2019) and Buenos Aires Province (since 2019). Co-founder of La Cámpora. Son of Néstor Kirchner and Cristina Fernández de Kirchner.

== L ==
=== Lanusse family ===
- Juan José Lanusse (1840–1927), Governor of Misiones (1896–1905).
- Antonio Lanusse (1913–1987), Minister of Defense (1966–1967). Cousin of Alejandro and Ernesto Lanusse.
- Alejandro Agustín Lanusse (1918–1996), De facto President of Argentina (1971–1973). Cousin of Antonio and Ernesto Lanusse.
- Ernesto Jorge Lanusse (1921–1998), Minister of Agriculture (1972–1973), Minister of Defense (1962). Cousin of Antonio and Alejandro Lanusse.
- Pablo Lanusse (born 1965), Federal Interventor of Santiago del Estero (2004–2005).
- Elena Holmberg Lanusse (1931–1978), diplomat, disappeared by the last military dictatorship (1976–1983). Cousin of Antonio, Alejandro and Ernesto Lanusse.

== M ==
=== Macri family ===
- Mauricio Macri (born 1959), President of Argentina (2015–2019), Chief of Government of Buenos Aires (2007–2015), National Deputy (2005–2007). President of Boca Juniors (2008; 1995–2007). Founder of Republican Proposal. Son of Franco Macri, cousin of Jorge Macri.
- Jorge Macri (born 1965), Chief of Government of Buenos Aires (since 2023), Mayor of Vicente López (2011–2021), Provincial Deputy of Buenos Aires (2005–2011). Cousin of Mauricio Macri.

=== Menem family ===
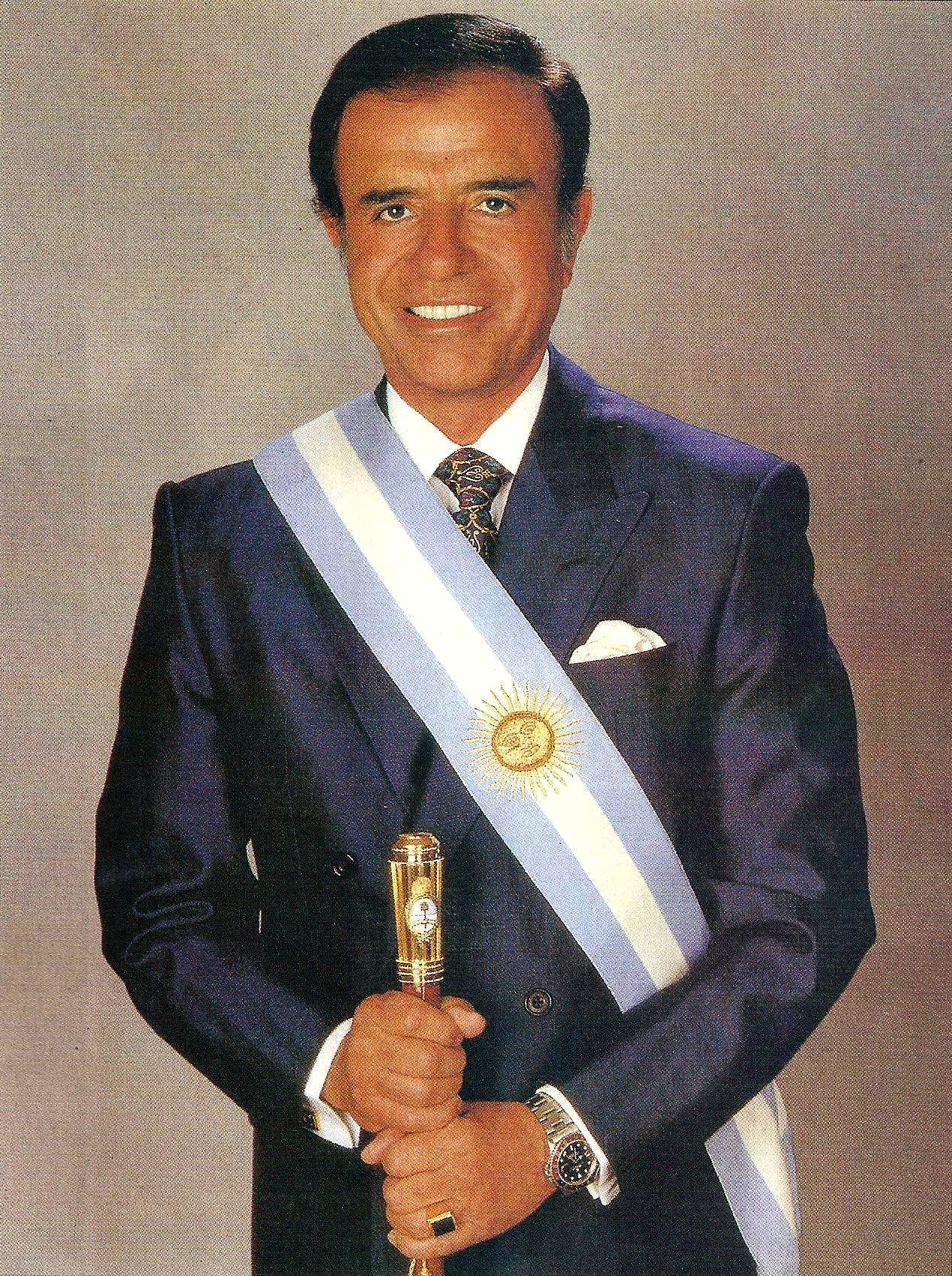
President Carlos Menem

- Carlos Saúl Menem (1930–2021), National Senator for La Rioja (2005–2021), President of Argentina (1989–1999), Governor of La Rioja (1983–1989; 1973–1976). President of the Justicialist Party (2001–2003; 1990–2001). Brother of Munir, Amado and Eduardo Menem.
- Munir Menem (1932–2010), Argentine Ambassador to Syria (1989–1990). Brother of Carlos Saúl, Amado and Eduardo Menem.
- Eduardo Menem (born 1938), National Senator for La Rioja (1983–2005) and Provisional President of the Senate (1989–1999). Brother of Carlos Saúl, Amado and Munir Menem.
  - Adrián Menem (born 1971), National Deputy (2003–2007). Son of Eduardo Menem.
  - Martín Menem (born 1975), National Deputy and President of the Argentine Chamber of Deputies (since 2023), Provincial Deputy of La Rioja (2021–2023). Son of Eduardo Menem.
  - Eduardo “Lule” Menem (born 1964), Senate aide (1984-2005, 2007-24), Sub-secretary of Institutional Management of the General Secretariat of the Presidency (since 2024). Nephew of Eduardo Menem.
    - Federico Sharif Menem (born c. 2001), General Director of the Private Secretariat of the Presidency, leader of the national youth of La Libertad Avanza. Son of “Lule” Menem, second degree nephew of Martín Menem.
- Amado Calixto Menem (c. 1923-2007), businessman, accused leader of the “Defensores de la Fe” far-right group, brother of Carlos Saúl, Eduardo and Munir Menem.
- Amado Omar Menem, chief of the La Rioja branch of PAMI (since 2024). Uncle of Martín Menem.
- Martha Meza (1952-2003), Provincial Deputy of Formosa (1984-1996), National Deputy (1999-2003), mother of a formerly unrecognized son of Carlos Menem.

==== Menem-Yoma family ====
- Zulema Yoma (born 1942), first wife of Carlos Menem, First Lady of Argentina (1989-95). Brother of Emir and Amira Yoma.
  - Carlos Saúl Facundo Menem (1968-1995), racing driver, son of Carlos Menem and Zulema Yoma.
  - Zulema María Eva Menem (born 1970), businessman, First Lady of Argentina (1995-99), daughter of Carlos Menem and Zulema Yoma.
- Emir Yoma (born 1947), advisor to President Carlos Menem. Brother of Zulema and Amira Yoma.
- Amalia Beatriz “Amira” Yoma (born 1952), aide of the Ministry of Labor (1999), Director of Hearings (1989-91), Advisor to the White Helmets Commission (1998-99). Sister of Zulema and Emir Yoma.
- Jorge Yoma (born 1953), Ambassador to Peru (2018–2019) and Mexico (2007–2009), National Deputy (2009–2013; 1989–1993), National Senator for La Rioja (1995–2005), Councillor of Magistracy (2001–2005). Cousin of Zulema, Amira and Emir Yoma.

==== Menem-Bolocco family ====
- Cecilia Bolocco (born 1965), Chilean model and actress, second wife of Carlos Menem.
- Diana Bolocco (born 1977), Chilean journalist and television presenter, brother of Cecilia and sister-in-law of Carlos Menem.

=== Mestre family ===
- Ramón Bautista Mestre (1937–2003), Minister of the Interior (2001), Federal Interventor of Corrientes (1999–2001), Governor of Córdoba (1995–1999), Mayor of Córdoba (1983–1991), Provincial Deputy of Córdoba (1973–1976).
  - Ramón Javier Mestre (born 1972), Mayor of Córdoba (2011–2019), National Senator for Córdoba (2009–2011). Son of Ramón Bautista Mestre, brother of Diego Mestre.
  - Diego Mestre (born 1978), National Deputy (2013–2021). Son of Ramón Bautista Mestre, brother of Ramón Javier Mestre.

=== Milei family ===
- Javier Milei (born 1970), President of Argentina (since 2023), National Deputy (2021–2023). Brother of Karina Milei.
- Karina Milei (born 1972), General Secretary of the Presidency (since 2023). Sister of Javier Milei.

=== Moreau family ===
- Leopoldo Moreau (born 1946), National Deputy (since 2017; 2001–2005; 1983–1995), President of the Chamber of Deputies (April–June 1989), National Senator for Buenos Aires (1995–2001), Presidential candidate (2003). Founder of the National Alfonsinist Movement.
  - Cecilia Moreau (born 1976), National Deputy (since 2015), Provincial Deputy of Buenos Aires (August–December 2015; 2007–2011). Daughter of Leopoldo Moreau.
  - Leandro Santoro (born 1976), National Deputy (since 2021), Legislator of the City of Buenos Aires (2017–2021). Ex-husband of Cecilia Moreau.
  - Carmela Moreau (born 1982), advisor at the Office of the Cabinet Chief (2019-2023). Founder of the Igualar Party. Daughter of Leopoldo Moreau.
- Alicia Moreau de Justo (1885–1986), a prominent feminist activist and member of the Socialist Party, is distantly related to the Moreau family.

== P ==
=== Pellegrini family ===
- Carlos Pellegrini (1846–1906), National Senator (1895–1903; 1881–1886), President of Argentina (1890–1892), Vice President of Argentina (1886–1890), Minister of War and the Navy (1885–1886; 1879–1880). Son of Charles Henri Pellegrini (1800–1875).
- Carlos Meyer Pellegrini (1874–1944), Minister of Public Works (1913–1914), De facto Governor of Buenos Aires (1931; 1930). Nephew of Carlos Pellegrini, grandson of Charles Henri Pellegrini.

=== Perié family ===
- Hugo Perié (1944-2011), National Deputy and Senator, Governor of Corrientes (1999). Brother of Julia.
- Julia Argentina Perié (b. 1956), National Deputy (2007-2015), Mercosur Parliament member. Sister of Hugo.

=== Perón family ===
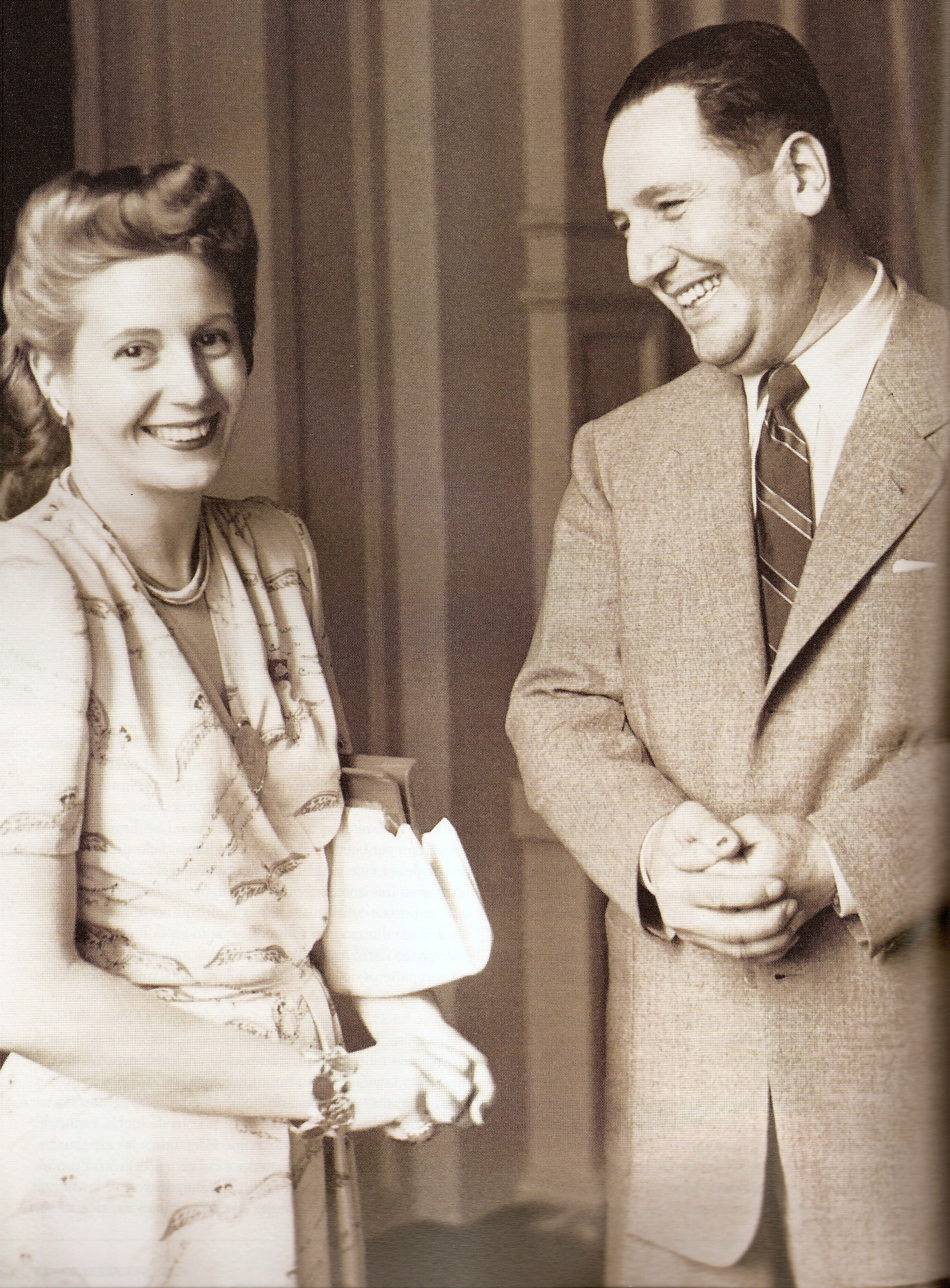
Eva Duarte de Perón (first lady, 1946–1952) and Juan Domingo Perón (president, 1973–1974; 1946–1955).

- Juan Domingo Perón (1895–1974), President of Argentina (1973–1974; 1946–1955), Vice President of Argentina and Minister of War (1944–1945), Secretary of Labour and Social Security (1943–1945). Founder of the Peronist Party (later Justicialist Party) and the Peronist movement. Husband of Eva Duarte de Perón (1946–1952) and of Isabel Martínez de Perón (1961–1974).
- Eva "Evita" Duarte de Perón (1919–1952), Spiritual Leader of the Nation (1952), First Lady of Argentina (1946–1952), President of the Eva Perón Foundation (1948–1952) and the Female Peronist Party (1949–1952). Second wife of Juan Domingo Perón (1946–1952).
- Isabel Martínez de Perón (born 1931), President of Argentina (1974–1976), Vice President and First Lady of Argentina (1973–1974). President of the Justicialist Party (1974–1985). Third wife of Juan Domingo Perón (1961–1974).

Cristina Álvarez Rodríguez (born 1967, National Deputy 2005–2007 and 2015-2021) is a great-niece of Eva Duarte de Perón.

=== Pinedo family ===
- Federico Pinedo (1855–1929), Minister of Justice (1906–1907), National Deputy (1904–1920), Mayor of Buenos Aires (1893–1894).
  - Federico Pinedo (1895–1971), Minister of Economy (1962; 1940–1941; 1933–1935). Son of Federico Pinedo (1855–1929).
    - Federico Pinedo (born 1955), National Senator for the City of Buenos Aires and Provisional President of the Senate (2015–2019), National Deputy (2003–2015). Grandson of Federico Pinedo (1895–1971).

== R ==
=== Ramos Mexía/Mejía family ===
- Gregorio Ramos Mexía (1725–1808), Regidor Perpetuo of the City of Buenos Aires (1766–1805).
  - Hilario Ramos Mexía (1764–1820), Contador Mayor of the Tribunal Mayor de Cuentas de Buenos Aires (1811–1814). Son of Gregorio Ramos Mexía.
  - Francisco Hermógenes Ramos Mexía (1773–1828), Regidor of the Cabildo of Buenos Aires (1810–1815). Son of Gregorio Ramos Mexía.
    - Matías Ramos Mejía (1810–1885), Colonel in the Argentine Civil Wars (1814–1880), Provincial Deputy of Buenos Aires. Son of Francisco Hermógenes Ramos Mexía.
      - José María Ramos Mejía (1849–1914), National Deputy (1888–1892). Son of Matías Ramos Mejía.
      - Francisco Ramos Mejía (1847–1893), historian and sociologist. Son of Matías Ramos Mejía.
        - Francisco Ramos Mejía (1877–1968), Minister of the Supreme Court of Argentina (1935–1947). Son of Francisco Ramos Mejía (1847–1893).
          - Francisco Ramos Mejía (1909–2000), Argentine Ambassador to Italy (1966–1970), Federal Interventor of Tucumán (1944). Co-founder of the Christian Democratic Party. Son of Francisco Ramos Mejía (1877–1968).
    - Ezequiel Ramos Mexía (1852–1935), Minister of Public Works (1907–1913) and Agriculture (1906–1907; 1901). Grandson of Francisco Hermógenes Ramos Mexía.
  - Ildefonso Ramos Mexía (1769–1854), Governor of Buenos Aires (1820). Son of Gregorio Ramos Mexía.

=== Rawson family ===
- Amán Rawson (1792–1847), Provincial Deputy of San Juan (1830–1839; 1822–1823).
  - Guillermo Rawson (1821–1890), Minister of the Interior (1862–1868). Son of Amán Rawson.
  - Juan de Dios Rawson (1833–1902), Colonel in the Argentine Civil Wars (1814–1880) and the Paraguayan War (1864–1870). Illegitimate son of Amán Rawson.
    - Elvira Rawson de Dellepiane (1865–1954), suffragist and women's rights activist. Daughter of Juan de Dios Rawson.
      - Arturo Rawson (1885–1952), Argentine Ambassador to Brazil (1943–1945), De facto President of Argentina (1943). Grandson of Juan de Dios Rawson.

=== Recalde family ===
- Héctor Recalde (1938-2024), National Deputy (2005-2017).
  - Mariano Recalde (b. 1972), National Senator (since 2019), son of Héctor.

=== Roca family ===
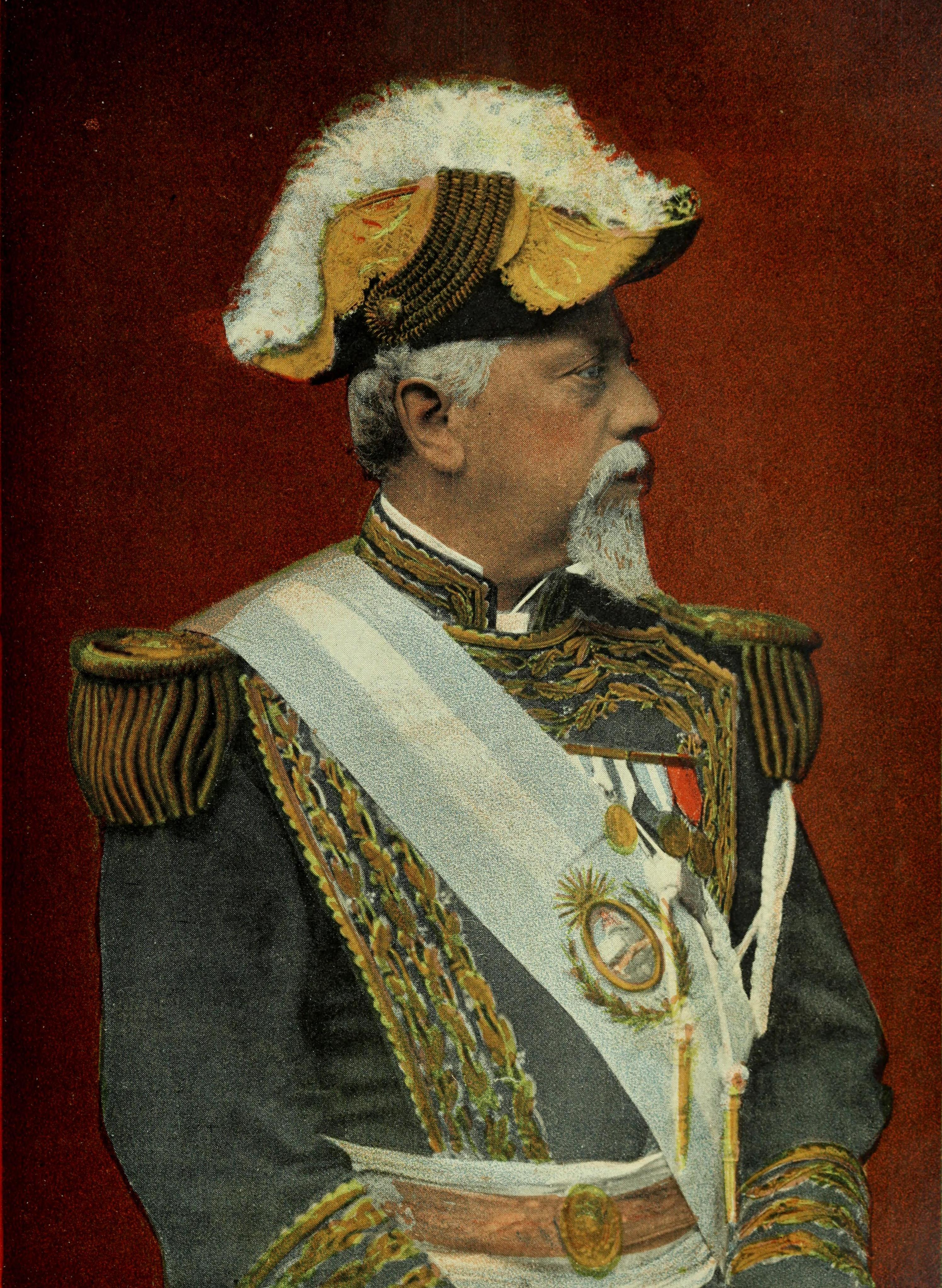
Julio Argentino Roca, President of Argentina from 1880 to 1886 and from 1898 to 1904.

- José Segundo Roca (1800–1866), Colonel in the Argentine War of Independence (1810–1818), the Argentine Civil Wars (1814–1880) and the Paraguayan War (1864–1870).
  - Antonio Ataliva Roca (1839–1912), National Deputy for the City of Buenos Aires (1884–1888). Son of José Segundo Roca.
  - Julio Argentino Roca (1843–1914), President of Argentina (1898–1904; 1880–1886), National Senator for Tucumán (1895–1889; 1892–1893) and the City of Buenos Aires (1888–1890), Minister of the Interior (1890–1891), and of War and the Navy (1878–1879), Provisional President of the Senate (1895–1898; 1892; 1889–1890). Co-founder of the National Autonomist Party, member of the Generation of '80, commander of the "Conquest of the Desert" (1870s–1884). Son of José Segundo Roca.
    - Julio Argentino Pascual Roca (1873–1942), Vice President of Argentina (1932–1938), Minister of Foreign Affairs and Worship (1940–1941), Argentine Ambassador to Brazil (1938–1939), Governor of Córdoba (1922–1925). Signing party of the Roca-Runciman Treaty. Son of Julio Argentino Roca.
  - Rudecindo Roca (1850–1903), Governor of Misiones (1882–1891). Son of José Segundo Roca.
- Eduardo A. Roca (1921–2019), Argentine Ambassador to the United Nations (1982), to the United States (1968–1970) and to the Organization of American States (1966–1968). Grand-nephew of Julio Argentino and Ataliva Roca.
- Inés Mónica Weinberg de Roca (born 1948), Justice of the Supreme Court of the City of Buenos Aires (since 2013) and of the United Nations Appeals Tribunal (2009–2016). Wife of Eduardo A. Roca.

=== Rodríguez Larreta family ===
- Horacio Rodríguez Larreta (1871–1935), Attorney General of Argentina (1923–1935).
- Horacio Rodríguez Larreta (1934–2004), chairman of Racing Club de Avellaneda (1977–1978), co-founder of the Integration and Development Movement (MID). Nephew of Horacio Rodríguez Larreta (1871–1935).
  - Horacio Rodríguez Larreta (born 1965), Chief of Government of Buenos Aires (2015–2023), Cabinet Chief of the City of Buenos Aires (2007–2015). Son of Horacio Rodríguez Larreta (1934–2004).

=== Rodríguez Saá family ===
- Carlos Juan Rodríguez (1831–1892), Governor of Mendoza (1866–1867), Governor of San Luis (1860–1861).
  - Benigno Rodríguez Jurado (1861–1920), Governor of San Luis (1904–1907). Son of Carlos Juan Rodríguez.
    - Adolfo Rodríguez Saá (1876–1933), National Senator for San Luis (1932–1933; 1923–1930), Governor of San Luis (1909–1912). Son of Benigno Rodríguez Jurado.
      - Adolfo Rodríguez Saá (born 1947), National Senator for San Luis (since 2005), National Deputy (2003–2005), President of Argentina (2001), Governor of San Luis (1983–2001), Provincial Deputy of San Luis (1973–1976). Grandson of Adolfo Rodríguez Saá, Sr.
      - Alberto Rodríguez Saá (born 1949), Governor of San Luis (2015-2023; 2003–2011), National Senator (2000–2001; 1983–1994). Grandson of Adolfo Rodríguez Saá, Sr.
        - Nicolás Rodríguez Saá (born 1984), National Deputy (2019-2021). Cousin of Adolfo and Alberto Rodríguez Saá.
    - Umberto Rodríguez Saá, Governor of San Luis (1922). Son of Benigno Rodríguez Jurado.
    - Ricardo Rodríguez Saá (d. 1951), Governor of San Luis (1934–1938). Son of Benigno Rodríguez Jurado.

=== Romero family ===
- Roberto Romero (1927–1992), National Deputy (1987–1991), Governor of Salta (1983–1987). Father of Juan Carlos Romero.
  - Juan Carlos Romero (born 1950), National Senator for Salta (since 2007; 1986–1995), Governor of Salta (1995–2007). Father of Bettina and Juan Esteban Romero.
    - Bettina Romero (born 1978), Mayor of Salta (since 2019), Provincial Deputy of Salta (2017–2019). Daughter of Juan Carlos Romero.
    - Juan Esteban Romero (born 1977), Provincial Deputy of Salta (since 2021). Son of Juan Carlos Romero.

=== Romero–Feris family ===
- Gabriel Feris (1914–2002), Vice Governor of Corrientes (1987–1991), National Senator for Corrientes (1983–1986). Brother-in-law of Julio Romero.
- Julio Romero (1916–2011), National Deputy (1987–1991), Governor of Corrientes (1973–1976). Brother-in-law of Gabriel Feris.
  - José Antonio Romero Feris (born 1941), National Senator for Corrientes (1987–2001), Governor of Corrientes (1983–1987), Provincial Deputy of Corrientes (1965–1966). Brother of Raúl Rolando Romero Feris, nephew of Gabriel Feris and Julio Romero.
  - Raúl Rolando Romero Feris (born 1946), Governor of Corrientes (1993–1997), Mayor of Corrientes (1989–1991; 1997–1999). Brother of José Antonio Romero Feris, nephew of Gabriel Feris and Julio Romero.

== S ==
=== Saadi family ===
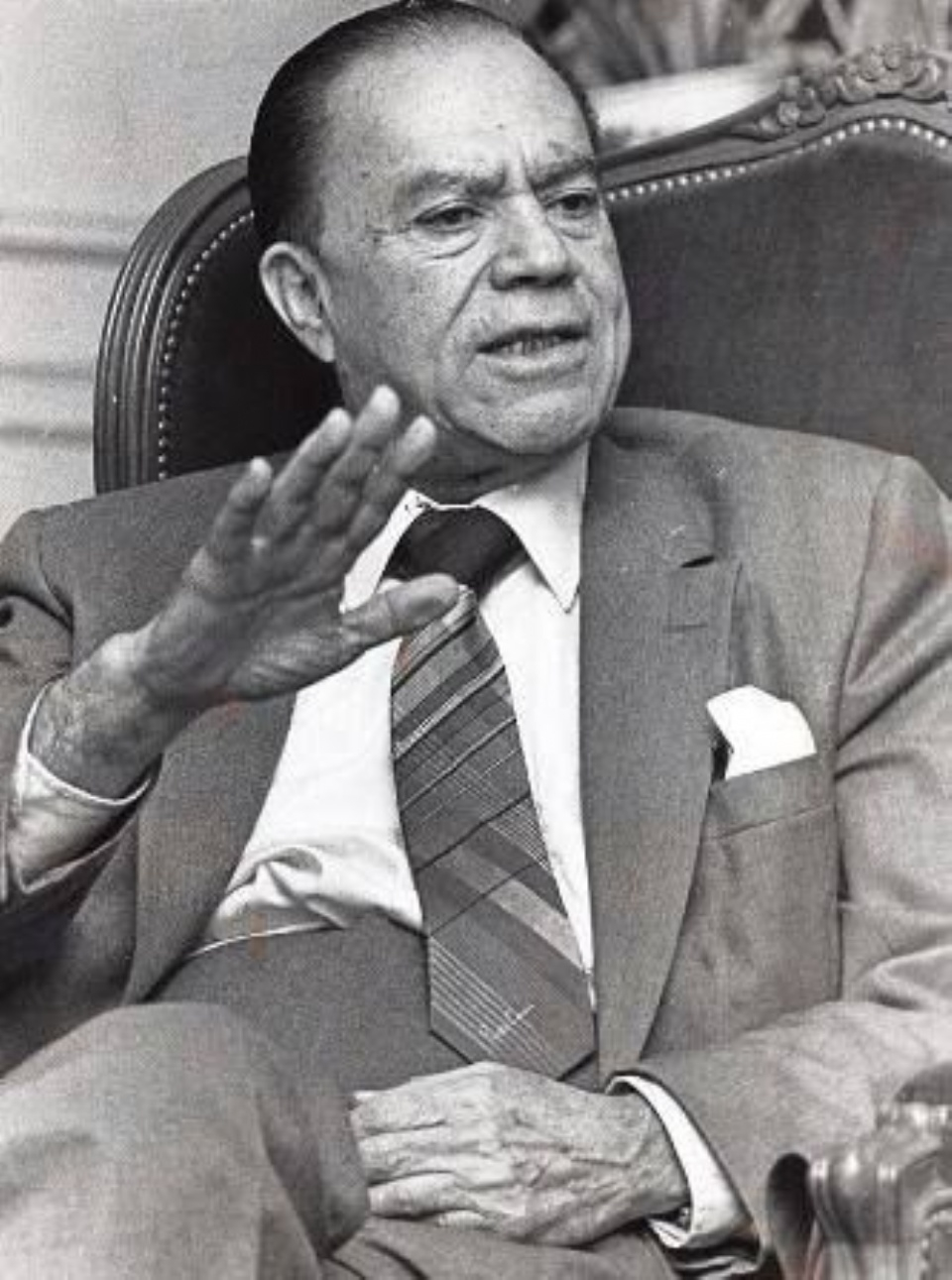
Vicente Saadi (1913–1988), twice governor of Catamarca Province and patriarch of the Saadi family.

- Vicente Saadi (1913–1988), Governor of Catamarca (1987–1988; 1949), National Senator for Catamarca (1983–1987; 1973–1976; 1946–1949).
  - Ramón Saadi (1949-2023), National Senator for Catamarca (2003–2009; 1987–1988), National Deputy (1991–2003), Governor of Catamarca (1988–1991, 1983–1987). Son of Vicente Saadi.
  - Pilar Kent de Saadi, National Senator for Catamarca, National Deputy. Wife of Ramón Saadi.
  - Alicia Saadi de Dentone (born 1950), National Senator for Catamarca (1988–1993). Daughter of Vicente Saadi.
  - Luis Saadi, Provincial Deputy of Catamarca. Son of Vicente Saadi.
  - Arnoldo Saadi, President of the Bank of Catamarca (1983–1987). Son of Vicente Saadi.
    - Gustavo Saadi (born 1975), Mayor of San Fernando del Valle de Catamarca (since 2019), National Deputy (2017–2019). Son of Arnoldo Saadi.
- Lucía Corpacci Saadi (born 1959), National Senator for Catamarca (since 2021; 2009–2011), National Deputy (2019–2021), Governor of Catamarca (2011–2019). Niece of Vicente Saadi.

=== Sáenz Peña family ===
- Luis Sáenz Peña (1822–1907), President of Argentina (1892–1895), Minister of the Supreme Court of Argentina (1890–1892), Vice Governor of Buenos Aires Province (1875–1878), National Deputy and President of the Chamber of Deputies (1874–1875).
  - Roque Sáenz Peña (1851–1914), President of Argentina (1910–1914), National Deputy (1906–1907), Minister of Foreign Affairs and Worship (1890). Sponsor of the Sáenz Peña Law. Son of Luis Sáenz Peña.

=== Sánchez de Bustamante family ===
- Teodoro Sánchez de Bustamante (1778–1851), Deputy for Jujuy in the Congress of Tucumán (1816–1820). Son of Manuel Domingo Sánchez de Bustamante.
  - Plácido Sánchez de Bustamante (1814–1886), Governor of Jujuy (1880–1882; 1855–1857). Son of Teodoro Sánchez de Bustamante.
- Benito Sánchez de Bustamante, Provincial Deputy of Jujuy (1864; 1853–1854).
  - Teófilo Sánchez de Bustamante (1828–1884), Governor of Jujuy (1873–1874). Son of Benito Sánchez de Bustamante.

Roque Alvarado (1793–1860), Governor of Jujuy, was also related to the Sánchez de Bustamante family through matrilineal descent.

=== Sapag family ===
- Elías Sapag (1911–1993), National Senator for Neuquén (1983–1993; 1973–1976; 1963–1966). Co-founder of the Neuquén People's Movement (MPN). Brother of Felipe and Amado Sapag.
  - Luz María Sapag (1944–2010), Mayor of San Martín de los Andes (2007–2010; 1991–1999), National Senator for Neuquén (2001–2007), Provincial Deputy of Neuquén (1999–2001). Daughter of Elías Sapag.
    - Carmen Lucila Crexell (born 1972), National Senator for Neuquén (since 2013). Daughter of Luz María Sapag.
  - Jorge Sapag (born 1950), Governor of Neuquén (2007–2015), Vice Governor of Neuquén (1999–2003). Son of Elías Sapag.
  - Alma Liliana "Chani" Sapag (born 1952), National Deputy (2017–2021). Daughter of Elías Sapag.
  - Felipe Rodolfo "Pipe" Sapag, Vice Governor of Neuquén (1991–1995). Son of Elías Sapag.
- Felipe Sapag (1917–2010), Governor of Neuquén (1995–1999; 1983–1987; 1973–1976; 1970–1972; 1963–1966). Co-founder of the MPN. Brother of Elías and Amado Sapag.
  - Luis Felipe Sapag (1947–2019), Provincial Deputy of Neuquén (2011–2019). Son of Felipe Sapag.
  - Silvia Sapag (born 1949), National Senator for Neuquén (since 2019; 1998–2001), National Deputy (2008–2009). Daughter of Felipe Sapag.
- Amado Sapag (1921–2002), Mayor of Zapala (1983–1987; 1973–1976; 1970–1972; 1966–1968; 1963–1966; 1952–1955). Co-founder of the MPN. Brother of Elías and Felipe Sapag.
  - Edgardo Sapag (born 1953), Mayor of Zapala (2008–2012; 1996–2000; 1991–1996). Son of Amado Sapag.

=== Snopek family ===
- Carlos Snopek (1914–1991), National Senator for Jujuy (1989–1991; 1966), Governor of Jujuy (1983–1987; 1973–1976). Brother of Guillermo Snopek, father of Carlos Daniel Snopek.
  - Carlos Daniel Snopek (born 1942), National Deputy (1997–2001), Minister of Social Welfare of Jujuy (1996–1997). Son of Carlos Snopek.
    - Alejandro Snopek (born 1972), Provincial Legislator of Jujuy (since 2019), National Deputy (2015–2019). Son of Carlos Daniel Snopek.
- Guillermo Snopek (1916–2007), Vice Governor of Jujuy (1966), National Senator for Jujuy (1963–1966). Brother of Carlos Snopek, father of Guillermo Eugenio Snopek.
  - Guillermo Eugenio Snopek (1947–1996), Governor of Jujuy (1995–1996). Son of Guillermo Snopek, father of Guillermo Eugenio Mario Snopek and Tulia Snopek.
    - Gerardo Morales (born 1959), former Governor of Jujuy (2015-23), husband of Tulia Snopek, son-in-law of Guillermo Eugenio Snopek.
    - Guillermo Eugenio Mario Snopek (born 1975), National Senator for Jujuy (since 2017), National Deputy (2015–2017), Provincial Legislator of Jujuy (2009–2015). Son of Guillermo Eugenio Snopek, brother of Tulia Snopek.

=== Soria family ===
- Carlos Soria (1949–2012), Governor of Río Negro (2011–2012), Mayor of General Roca (2003–2011), Secretary of Intelligence (2002), National Deputy (1999–2002; 1983–1999), Minister of Justice of Buenos Aires Province (1999).
  - Martín Soria (born 1975), Minister of Justice and Human Rights (2021-2023), National Deputy (since 2023; 2019–2021), Mayor of General Roca (2011–2019). Son of Carlos Soria.
  - María Emilia Soria (born 1985), Mayor of General Roca (since 2019), National Deputy (2013–2019). Daughter of Carlos Soria.

=== Suárez family ===
- Ulpiano Suárez, Mayor of San Carlos.
  - Ulpiano Suárez, Provincial Deputy of Mendoza and President of the Chamber of Deputies of Mendoza. Son of Ulpiano Suárez (Mayor of San Carlos).
    - Ulpiano Suárez, Radical Civic Union candidate for Mayor of San Carlos (1983). Son of Ulpiano Suárez (Provincial Deputy).
      - Ulpiano Suárez (born 1970), Mayor of Mendoza (since 2019). Son of Ulpiano Suárez (Candidate for Mayor).
    - Rodolfo Suárez (born 1963), National Senator for Mendoza (since 2023), Governor of Mendoza (2019-2023), Mayor of Mendoza (2014–2019). Son of Ulpiano Suárez (Provincial Deputy).

== U ==
=== Uriburu family ===
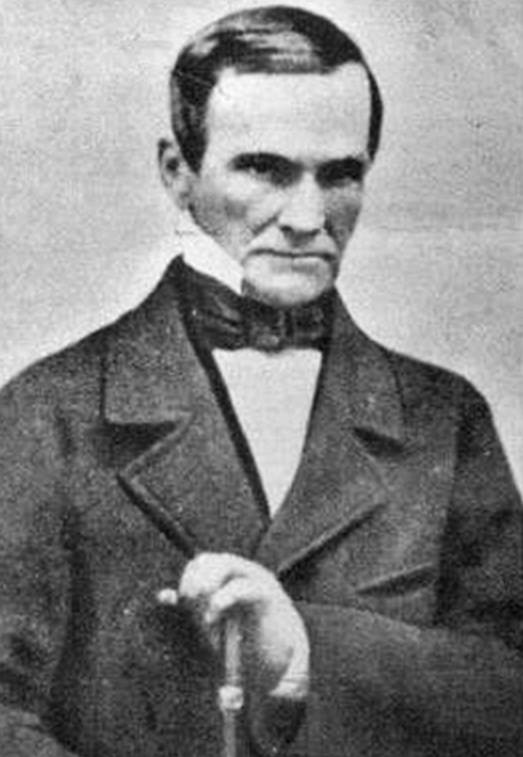
Evaristo de Uriburu (1796–1885), father of President José Evaristo Uriburu and grandfather of President José Félix Uriburu.

- Evaristo de Uriburu (1796–1885). Colonel in the Argentine War of Independence (1810–1818) and the Argentine Civil Wars (1814–1880).
  - José Evaristo Uriburu (1831–1914), President of Argentina (1895–1898), Vice President of Argentina (1892–1895), National Senator for the City of Buenos Aires (1901–1910) and Provisional President of the Senate (1902–1906; 1908–1909), National Deputy (1862–1868; 1873–1877) and President of the Chamber of Deputies (1863–1864; 1865–1867), Procurator of the National Treasury (1869–1870), Minister of Justice (1867–1868). Son of Evaristo de Uriburu.
    - José Félix Uriburu (1868–1932), De facto President of Argentina (1930–1932). Son of José Evaristo Uriburu.
    - José Evaristo Uriburu Tezanos Pinto (1880–1956), Vice President of the Central Bank of Argentina (1935–1947), Argentine Ambassador to the United Kingdom (1921–1931). Son of José Evaristo Uriburu.
  - Napoleón Uriburu (1835–1895), Governor of Formosa (1891–1893), Governor of Chaco (1875–1876). Son of Evaristo de Uriburu.
  - Francisco Uriburu (1837–1906), National Senator for Salta (1898–1906), Federal Interventor of Mendoza (1892), Minister of the Treasury (1890), National Deputy (1872–1876). Son of Evaristo de Uriburu.
    - Enrique Casiano Uriburu (1876–1936), Minister of the Treasury (1931–1932), President of the Bank of the Argentine Nation (1930–1931). Son of Francisco Uriburu.
- Juan Nepomuceno Uriburu (1805–1887), Governor of Salta (1862–1864).
  - Pío Uriburu (1844–1920), Governor of Salta (1898–1901). Son of Juan Nepomuceno Uriburu.
- José María Uriburu (1846–1909), Governor of Formosa (1893–1901). Grandson of Evaristo de Uriburu, cousin of José Evaristo Uriburu and Napoleón Uriburu.
- José Camilo Uriburu (1914–1996), Federal Interventor of Córdoba (1971). Nephew of José Félix Uriburu.
  - José Alberto Uriburu (born 1949), Minister of Labour and Social Security (1999). Son of José Camilo Uriburu.

Carlos Ibarguren (1877–1956), Minister of Justice and Federal Interventor of Córdoba, and Raúl Prebisch (1901–1986), Executive Secretary of the UNECLAC and Secretary General of the UNCTAD were also related to the Uriburu family through matrilineal descent.

== V ==
=== Vaca Narvaja family ===
- Hugo Vaca Narvaja (1917–1976), Minister of the Interior (1962). Co-founder of the Intransigent Radical Civic Union. Disappeared and assassinated by the last military dictatorship (1976–1983).
  - Fernando Vaca Narvaja (born 1948), Minister of Public Works of Río Negro Province (2012–2014). Co-founder of Montoneros. Son of Hugo Vaca Narvaja.
    - Sabino Vaca Narvaja (born 1975), Argentine Ambassador to China (2021-2023). Son of Fernando Vaca Narvaja.
  - Patricia Vaca Narvaja (born 1955), Argentine Ambassador to Mexico (2010–2015), National Deputy (2005–2009). Daughter of Hugo Vaca Narvaja.

=== Valdés family ===
- Manuel Valdés, City Councillor of Ituzaingó (2015–2019), Mayor of Ituzaingó (2005–2013). Brother of Octavio Valdés, husband of Juana Mosqueda de Valdés, father of Gustavo Valdés.
- Juana Mosqueda de Valdés, City Councillor of Ituzaingó. Wife of Manuel Valdés, mother of Gustavo Valdés.
  - Gustavo Valdés (born 1968), Governor of Corrientes, National Deputy (2013–2017), Councillor of Magistracy (2014–2017). Son of Manuel Valdés and Juana Mosqueda de Valdés.
- Octavio Valdés (d. 2019), Provincial Deputy of Corrientes (2005–2009), Mayor of Ituzaingó (1997–2005). Brother of Manuel Valdés.

== See also ==
- List of political families
