= SAA =

Saa or SAA may refer to:

== Languages ==
- Saa language, a language of Vanuatu
- Saba language of Chad (ISO 639 code: saa)

== Law ==
- Space Act Agreement, a type of legal agreement with NASA
- Stabilisation and Association Process, for countries seeking to join the European Union
- Swiss Abroad Act (Switzerland)

== Organizations ==
=== Armed forces ===
- Anbar Salvation Council, a collection of tribal militias in the Al Anbar province of Iraq
- South African Army
- Syrian Arab Army, the land force branch of the Syrian Armed Forces

=== Companies ===
- Saudi Arabian Airlines, now known as Saudia
- Shanghai Airport Authority
- South African Airways

=== Professional and trade associations ===
- Society for American Archaeology
- Society of American Archivists
- Stock Artists Alliance, a trade association of photographers
- Sub-Aqua Association, a diver training organization in the UK

=== Schools ===
- Sainte Agathe Academy, a primary and secondary school in Sainte-Agathe-des-Monts, Quebec
- Savannah Arts Academy, a Georgia, US high school
- Singapore Aviation Academy, the primary educational and training facility of the Civil Aviation Authority of Singapore
- Spencerville Adventist Academy, a Seventh-day Adventist school in Silver Spring, Maryland
- School of American Archaeology, since 2007 known as the School for Advanced Research

=== Other organizations ===
- Sex Addicts Anonymous, an addiction recovery program
- South Australian Association, which promoted the British Colonisation of South Australia
- Southern Athletic Association, a U.S. college athletic conference
- Specialist Anglers Alliance (UK), now part of the Angling Trust
- Spondylitis Association of America
- Standards Australia, a standards organisation previously known as the Standards Association of Australia

== People ==
- The Rodríguez Saá family of Argentina, including:
  - Adolfo Rodríguez Saá (born 1947) ex-interim President of Argentina
  - Adolfo Rodríguez Saá (elder) (born 19th century), Argentine politician
  - Alberto Rodríguez Saá (born 1949) Argentinian politician
  - Nicolás Rodríguez Saá (born 1984), Argentinian national deputy
  - Ricardo Rodríguez Saá, Argentinian politician
- Carlos Saa (born 1983), Colombian football player
- Diego Saa (born 1980), Ecuadorian politician
- Salima Saa, French politician
- Saa Emerson Lamina, Sierra Leonean politician

== Places ==
=== Transportation facilities ===
- Saattut Heliport (non-IATA location identifier: SAA) in Saattut, Greenland
- Shively Field (IATA airport identifier: SAA) in Saratoga, Wyoming, US
- St Albans Abbey railway station, in St Albans, Hertfordshire, UK
- Stockholm-Arlanda Airport, Sweden

=== Other places ===
- Saa, Benin, a town and arrondissement in Benin
- Saa, Cameroon, a town in the Centre Province of Cameroon
- Saar (protectorate) (IOC country code SAA used from 1952 until 1956)
- Saaremaa, Estonian island, IIGA country code
- Shaanxi, a province of China (Guobiao abbreviation SAA)
- South Atlantic Anomaly, a magnetic anomaly in the South Atlantic Ocean

== Science and technology ==
=== Computing ===
- Service Assurance Agent, used for Network Management
- Stateless Address Autoconfiguration; see IPv6
- Systems Application Architecture, an interface standard by IBM

=== Medicine ===
- Serum amyloid A
- Severe aplastic anemia
- Spondylitis Association of America
- Steroidal antiandrogen, a type of antiandrogen medication

=== Spaceflight ===
- Solar aspect angle or beta angle, in orbital spaceflight
- South Atlantic Anomaly, a magnetic anomaly above the South Atlantic Ocean
- Space Act Agreement, a type of legal agreement with NASA

=== Other ===
- Colt Single Action Army, a revolver
- Sulfur amino acid, or sulfur-containing amino acid, a class of amino acids

== Other uses ==
- Sia (god), also called Saa, the deification of wisdom in Egyptian mythology

== See also ==
- SAA2
- SAA4
- Saas (disambiguation)
- SA2 (disambiguation)
- SA (disambiguation)
