= Rodríguez Saá =

Rodríguez Saá is the surname of a powerful family of the San Luis Province in Argentina, whose members include:

- Adolfo Rodríguez Saá (elder), governor of the province (1909–12)
- Adolfo Rodríguez Saá, former senator and governor of the province and interim president of Argentina for a few days.
- Alberto Rodríguez Saá, former senator and current governor of the province.
- Nicolás Rodríguez Saá, national deputy (2019–21).
- Ricardo Rodríguez Saá, governor of the province (1934–38).

== See also ==
- Saa (disambiguation)
- Rodriguez (disambiguation)
