= Crédito =

Former Argentine local currency

1998–2002 Argentine
great depression

Economy of Argentina
Argentine peso
Convertibility plan
Corralito
Corralón
Cacerolazo
2001 riots
Apagón
Economic emergency law
Debt restructuring

The Crédito was a local currency started on 1 May 1995 in Bernal, Argentina, at a garage sale, which was the first of many neighbourhood barter markets (Spanish: mercados de trueque) and barter clubs (Spanish: clubes de trueque) that emerged in Argentina during the 1998–2002 Argentine great depression. At the barter clubs, people could exchange goods and services, often using créditos. An estimated 2.5 million Argentinians used the Crédito between 2001 and 2003.

The currency started as a local exchange trading system (LETS), but was soon replaced by a number of printed currencies. After further experimentation with a LETS called nodine (from no dinero, "not money"), it finally became the Crédito (Spanish for "credit"), a printed currency again.

The operator of this currency was the Global Network of Multi-Reciprocal Exchange Clubs (Spanish: Red Global de Clubes de Trueque Multirecíproco, RGT), or more simply the "Global Exchange Network" (GEN). The RGT was organized as a chaordic network of barter clubs, which had a clientele from a well-educated middle class that had fallen into unemployment during the Argentine recession of the late 1990s.

The clubs of the RGT had no central organ, no central administration and no legislation. Clubs decided for themselves whether they accept the créditos of other clubs or not, and not all clubs issued their own créditos. Clubs that did usually issued between 30 and 50 créditos per participant. In a later phase, some of the clubs joined zones or networks, and zones became the issuers of créditos instead of individual clubs. The chaordic structure allowed the system to grow quickly, but also left the system vulnerable to fraud. The system was used all over Argentina and worked reasonably well for a time.

The crédito was an interest-free currency and was pegged to the Argentine peso, which in turn was pegged to the US dollar at the time. An estimated $400 million in goods and services were traded in 2000. As of May 6, 2001, over $7 million worth of créditos were circulated, each bearing barcodes to prevent counterfeiting. A survey conducted by members of the economics department of Harvard University reported a personal exchange rate of about two créditos for one peso during 2002-2003 by individuals who offered goods or services in both currencies.

As more and more people joined the RGT clubs, a growing percentage of people spent their créditos without offering sufficient skills or trade in return. At its peak in 2002, hyperinflation and counterfeiting became rampant, while solidarity and participation decreased, since the increasing scale of use increased distrust in the system made the barter clubs difficult to self-manage.

By July 2002, the unemployment rate in Argentina was in excess of 20% and an estimated 7-10% of the population participated in the barter clubs. Argentina had already had a high unemployment rate of about 17% for six years previously. Between 2002 and 2003, the government made unemployment insurance available to 2.5 million people, compared to 0.2 million people previously, which thereby increased the availability of the peso to the population stratum using the crédito. The Argentine population also had an 89% preference for pesos over créditos. The improving economic conditions and the public's overwhelming preference for the peso contributed to the decline of the crédito.

Other complementary currencies that were used in Argentina during the Argentine great depression include the Patacón and the LECOP. The Argentine argentino was also proposed, but was never implemented.
