= Claudio Poggi =

Argentine accountant and peronist politician

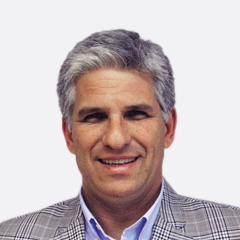

Governor of San Luis
- Incumbent
- Assumed office 10 December 2023
- Vice Governor: Ricardo Endeiza
- Preceded by: Alberto Rodríguez Saá
- Succeeded by: Alberto Rodríguez Saá
- In office 9 December 2011 – 10 December 2015
- Vice Governor: Jorge Raúl Díaz
- Preceded by: Alberto Rodríguez Saá
- Succeeded by: Alberto Rodríguez Saá

National Deputy
- In office 10 December 2021 – 10 December 2023
- Constituency: San Luis
- In office 10 December 2003 – 10 December 2009
- Constituency: San Luis

National Senator
- In office 10 December 2017 – 10 December 2021
- Constituency: San Luis

Personal details
- Born: 7 October 1963 (age 62) Alcira Gigena, Córdoba Province, Argentina
- Party: Advance San Luis
- Other political affiliations: Juntos por el Cambio
- Spouse: Sandra Correa
- Profession: Accountant

Claudio Javier Poggi (born 7 October 1963) is an Argentine accountant and peronist politician. Since 2023, he has been governor of San Luis Province, a position he previously held from 2011 to 2015.

He has sat on both chambers of the Argentine Congress as a representative from San Luis: from 2017 to 2021, he sat in the Argentine Senate, and he was a National Deputy from 2003 to 2009 and later from 2019 to 2023.

== Early life and career ==
Poggi was born in Alcira Gigena, a rural community near Río Cuarto, Córdoba. He enrolled at the National University of Río Cuarto, earning a degree in Accountancy. He married Sandra Correa, and they had two children. They relocated to neighboring San Luis Province, and in 1991 Poggi entered public service as Representative for San Luis at the Federal Investment Council (CFI). He then served in a managerial capacity at the local Acindar steel mill. Governor Adolfo Rodríguez Saá appointed him Undersecretary of the Economy in 1995, and in 1999, Minister of Economy and Public Works.

== Political career ==
He served as Undersecretary of Interministerial Coordination during Adolfo Rodríguez Saá's brief turn as interim President appointed on an emergency basis by Congress in December 2001. Poggi returned to San Luis as Minister of Economy and Public Works for Governor Alicia Lemme, and in 2003 was elected to the Argentine Chamber of Deputies. He concomitantly served as Minister of Public Works and Tourism for Lemme's successor, Governor Alberto Rodríguez Saá. Poggi was elected to the San Luis Provincial Legislature in 2009, serving as the chamber's president until July 2010, when he accepted an appointment as Head of the Cabinet of Ministers in Rodríguez Saá's administration.

He was endorsed by the governor to run as his successor in 2011 on the Federal Commitment ticket, a center-right faction of the Justicialist Party whose strength is greatest in San Luis. He was thus elected governor, winning nearly 58% of the vote and defeating the runner-up, Front for Victory candidate Alfonso Vergés, by 32%. His victory represented the eighth consecutive election won by a Rodríguez Saá or close ally since democracy was restored in Argentina in 1983; Poggi stressed his wish to maintain continuity in the province, one of Argentina's fastest growing, citing the Rodríguez Saá administrations as "models to follow".

Political offices
Preceded by Alberto Rodríguez Saá	Governor of San Luis; 2011–2015	Succeeded by Alberto Rodríguez Saá
Preceded by Alberto Rodríguez Saá	Governor of San Luis; 2023–present	Incumbent
