= El Apagón (disambiguation) =

"El Apagón" is a song by Bad Bunny from Un Verano Sin Ti.

El Apagón may also refer to:

- "El Apagón", a song by Yuri from Soy Libre
- El Apagón, an album by Dante Spinetta

== See also ==
- Apagón
