= Patacón (bond) =

Former Argentine bond

1998–2002 Argentine
great depression

Economy of Argentina
Argentine peso
Convertibility plan
Corralito
Corralón
Cacerolazo
2001 riots
Apagón
Economic emergency law
Debt restructuring

One Patacón

Two Patacón

The Patacón (officially called Letra de Tesorería para Cancelación de Obligaciones de la Provincia de Buenos Aires) was a bond issued by the government of the province of Buenos Aires, Argentina, during 2001. The patacones were used to pay government bills, including state employees' salaries during a period when the economic crisis caused regular currency (Argentine pesos) to be scarce. Patacones then circulated in the economy in much the same way as pesos.

First issued during the peso/U.S. dollar convertibility regime, just like other complementary currency Patacones could be attractive due to a revenue scheduled for payment in 2003 in pesos (practically equivalent to dollars). When the convertibility was abandoned amid fears of hyperinflation, the attractiveness of this revenue practically disappeared. The basis for the acceptability of complementary currency shifted to their use to pay taxes.

However, the value of Patacones became eroded as the series "B" was issued because as a way to put pressure on the Government to cancel a large debt, the company that printed them eliminated many safety features deemed too expensive, thus making them easier to counterfeit. Also, the revenue of series "B" was scheduled for payment just in 2006. The economic importance of Buenos Aires province ensured the acceptability of Patacones because there were plenty of large companies that found use for them as payment of provincial charges. Patacones were accepted outside the Buenos Aires province and eventually circulated (albeit informally) in border areas of neighboring countries.

The name patacón is derived from a former Argentine national currency, and had been used in various places as a variant name for the Peso. It was colloquially or jokingly used as a synonym of "money". The word was made popular by the popular comic hero Patoruzú -a wealthy, generous Indian ever ready to hand large heaps of bank notes to anyone in need, urging them to accept "these Patacones".

Other complementary currencies in Argentina at that time were the Crédito, the LECOP and the Argentino.
