= Oraldo Britos =

Argentine politician (1933–2023)

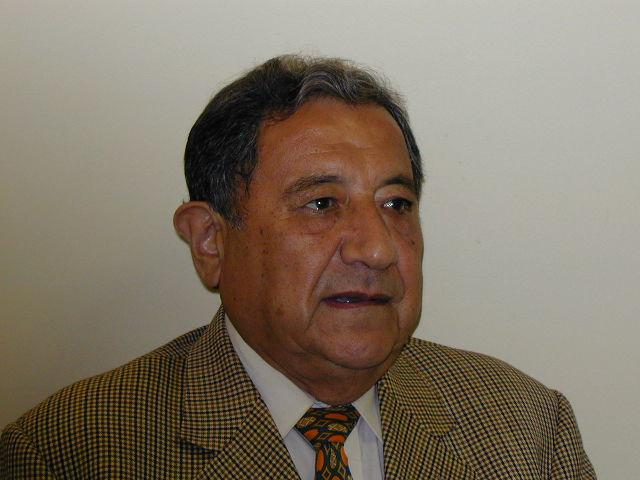
- Britos in 2017

National Senator
- In office 3 May 1973 – 24 March 1976
- Preceded by: Junta Militar (Argentine Revolution)
- Succeeded by: Dissolved legislative (Dirty War)
- In office 29 Novembre 1983 – 9 December 1995
- Preceded by: Junta Militar (Dirty War)
- Succeeded by: Bernardo Pascual Quinzio
- Constituency: San Luis

Chamber of Deputies
- Constituency: San Luis
- In office 10 December 1995 – 9 December 2003

Personal details
- Born: Oraldo Norvel Britos; 24 March 1933 San Luis, Argentina
- Died: 7 September 2023 (aged 90) Autonomous city of Buenos Aires, Argentina
- Party: Justicialist Party
- Spouse: Margarita Edith Muñoz
- Relatives: Roque Javier Britos (brother) Norma Lucía Britos (nephew) Augusto Javier Fernández Britos (grandnephew)
- Occupation: Politician, syndicalist

Oraldo Norvel Britos (24 March 1933 – 7 September 2023), also known as Oraldo Britos, was an Argentine politician who was the Minister of Labor during the presidency of Adolfo Rodríguez Saá in Argentina. He was a Peronist railway union delegate during the repressive Plan CONINTES.

== Life and career ==
Oraldo Norvel Britos was born on 24 March 1933.

He began his career in the labor movement, particularly within the railway sector, as a member of the Unión Ferroviaria (Railway Union). He was an active participant in the "Peronist Resistance" following the 1955 coup that ousted President Juan Domingo Perón and proscribed the Peronist movement.

He served multiple terms as a National Senator representing the province of San Luis. Within the Justicialist Party, Britos was identified with orthodox Peronism, often taking a critical stance against the party’s more progressive or reformist factions. In 1981, during the military dictatorship, he was briefly appointed interim governor of San Luis. In 2002, during the interim presidency of Eduardo Duhalde, Britos was appointed Minister of Labor. His term was short-lived, taking place amid Argentina’s severe economic and social crisis.

Britos was Senator for San Luis Province variously from 1973, 1983, 1986, and 1995.

In April 2004, he was expelled from Peronism for supporting Daniel Pérsico after a contested election for the mayorship of San Luis.

Throughout his career, Britos was known for his staunch loyalty to Peronist ideals and his enduring connections to traditional labor union structures. He remained a vocal figure within the movement, often defending what he viewed as the foundational principles of Peronism.

== Legislative work ==
During his tenure in the Argentine Congress, Britos was actively involved in various committees and contributed to significant legislative initiatives:

Committee Memberships:

- President of the Committee on Labor and Social Welfare in the Senate (1983–1995).
- Vice President of the Senate (1992–1995).
- President of the Committee on Social Security and Welfare in the Chamber of Deputies.
- Member of the Committee on Labor Legislation.
- Member of the Joint Parliamentary Committee for the Review of Public Accounts.

Legislative Initiatives:

- Authored and supported laws related to prenatal allowances, disability protection, collective labor agreements, and trade union associations.
- Advocated for comprehensive protection for Malvinas War veterans.
- Instrumental in the creation of the National Institute of Social Security.
- Promoted the establishment of a guarantee fund for labor credits.
- Supported legislation granting special pensions to families of disappeared persons and extending pension benefits to minors.

Britos also represented Argentina in international labor forums, including multiple invitations to the International Labour Organization in Geneva, reflecting his commitment to labor rights on both national and international stages.

Oraldo Britos died on 7 September 2023, at the age of 90.
