= Nicolás Rodríguez Saá =

Argentine politician

Nicolás Rodríguez-Saá
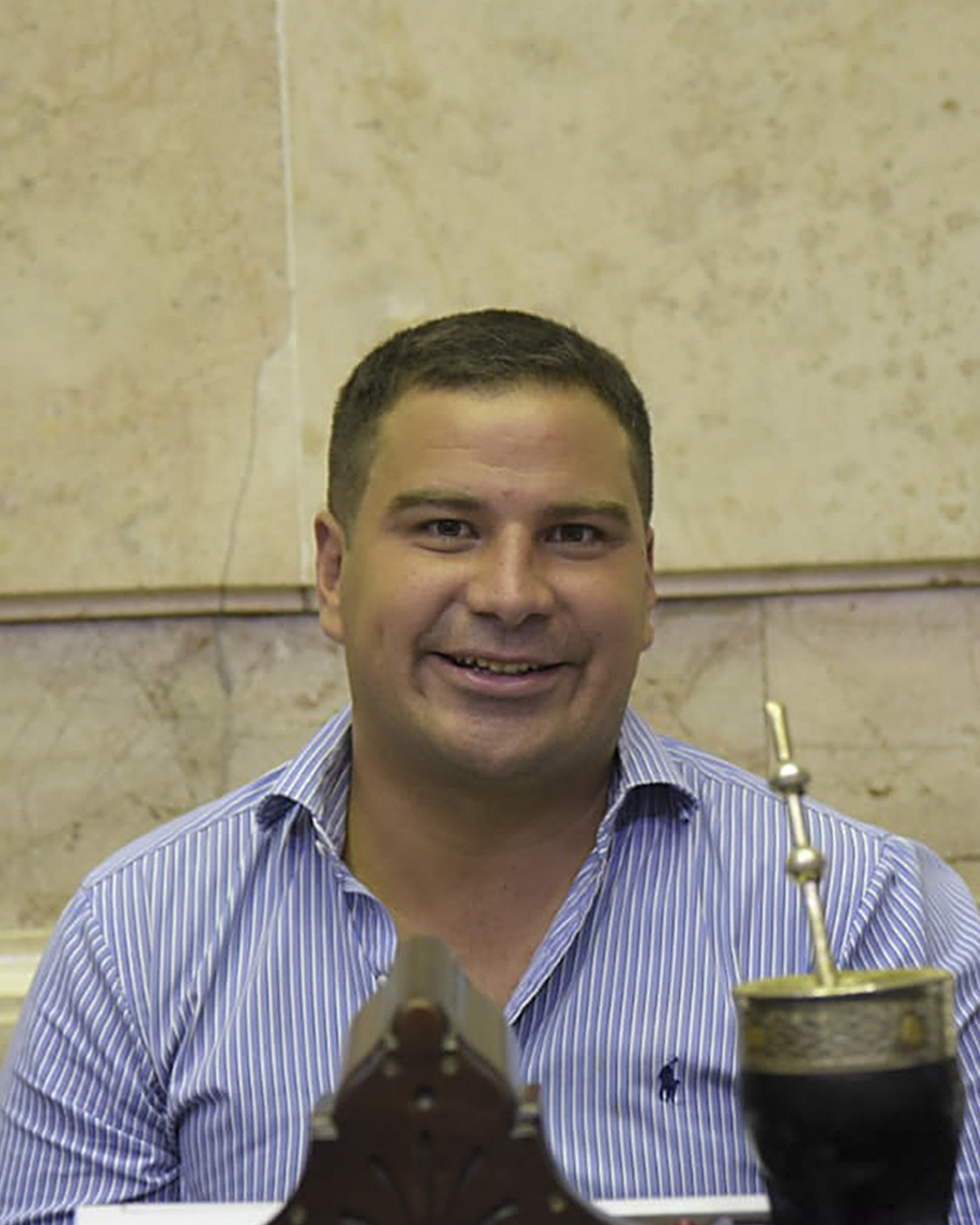

National Deputy
- In office 19 December 2019 – 10 December 2021
- Constituency: Buenos Aires

Personal details
- Born: 10 May 1984 (age 42) San Luis, Argentina
- Party: Justicialist Party
- Other political affiliations: Unidad Ciudadana (2017–2019); Frente de Todos (2019–present)
- Education: University of Buenos Aires

Nicolás Marcelo Rodríguez-Saá (born 10 May 1984) is an Argentine politician who served as a National Deputy from 2019 to 2021. He is a member of the Justicialist Party.

== Early life and education ==
Nicolás Marcelo Rodríguez-Saá was born on 10 May 1984 in San Luis, into the prominent Rodríguez-Saá political family. His first cousins are former governors of San Luis Province, Adolfo Rodríguez-Saá and Alberto Rodríguez-Saá. He studied law at the University of Buenos Aires.

Rodríguez-Saá is in a relationship with Justicialist Party politician and deputy for Entre Ríos, Carolina Gaillard, with whom he has a son, Felipe, born in 2020.

== Political career ==
Rodríguez-Saá began his career as a legal advisor at the Ministry of Foreign Affairs and Worship in 2014. He would later be an advisor to Governor Alberto Rodríguez-Saá, in 2017. That year, he was appointed director of the Casa de San Luis, the "cultural embassy" of San Luis Province in Buenos Aires. From 2018 to 2019, Rodríguez-Saá was director of legal affairs at the municipality of José C. Paz Partido, in the administration of intendente Mario Alberto Ishii.

Rodríguez-Saá ran for a seat in the Argentine Chamber of Deputies in the 2017 legislative election, as the 16th candidate in the Unidad Ciudadana list. The list received 36.28% of the votes, not enough for Rodríguez Saá to be elected. On 19 December 2019, he took office in place of Laura Alonso, who resigned to become Secretary of Social Inclusivity. He formed part of the Frente de Todos parliamentary bloc.

As deputy, Rodríguez-Saá formed part of the parliamentary commissions on Political Trials, National Defense, Justice, Criminal Legislation, Foreign Affairs, and Internal Security. He was a supporter of the legalization of abortion in Argentina, and voted in favor of the 2020 Voluntary Interruption of Pregnancy bill, which passed the Chamber.

Ahead of the 2021 primary election, Rodríguez-Saá was confirmed as one of the alternate candidates in the Frente de Todos list in Buenos Aires Province.
