= SA2 =

SA2 may refer to:

- SA-2 Guideline, the NATO reporting name of the S-75 Dvina, a Soviet SAM system
- Sonic Adventure 2, a video game released for the Dreamcast in 2001 and later ported to the GameCube in 2002.
- Sonic Advance 2, a video game released in 2003 for the Game Boy Advance

== See also ==
- SAA2
- SAA (disambiguation)
- Sasa (disambiguation)
- SA (disambiguation)
