= Desmalvinización =

Argentine social concept

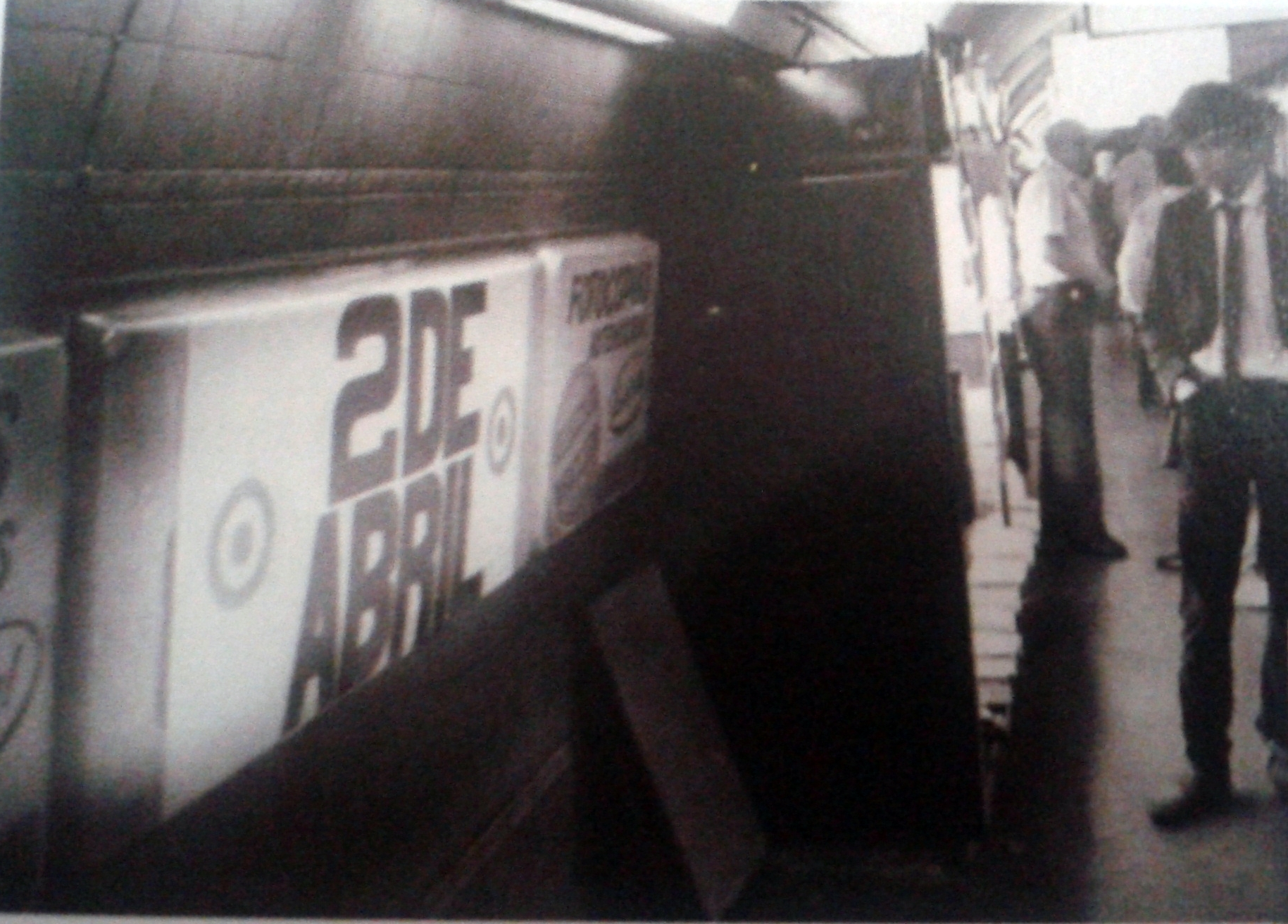
The Scalabrini Ortiz, formerly known as Canning on remembrance of British statesman George Canning, was shortly named as April 2 Station during the war.

Desmalvinización (Spanish, translated as dismalvinisation) is a concept and phenomenon in Argentine society and politics that emerged after the defeat of the Falklands War in 1982 and the early years of the return to democracy. Through this process, the media refrained from mentioning the war. It contrasts with the nationalistic, anti-British fervour that preceded and accompanied the war, encouraged by the military junta that ruled Argentina at the time. When the soldiers returned, they were almost ignored by society, being regarded by the collective imagination as mere "war kids" and victims of the military dictatorship that ruled Argentina during that time.

The dismalvinisation rhetoric stripped away every heroic and patriotic act that took place in the islands, as well as encapsulating the prevailing social and political climate in Argentina at the end of such a conflict which was taken as a "product of the dictatorship". As a consequence, it seemed necessary to delegitimize the war, to diminish it, and to overshadow everything associated with it. Argentine nationalism rapidly vanished after the war and taken as shameful. Those who consider the war as a patriotic cause or as an anticolonial struggle, were seen as dictatorship apologists.

It gets its name from the Spanish denomination for the islands: Islas Malvinas. The author of the concept was the French political scientist and sociologist Alain Rouquié, and it was used by veterans, political forces, and various authors. This concept can be defined as "a political-discursive device aimed at producing a 'narrative' and establishing an 'imaginary' about the Falklands in Argentine society." It achieved significant social resonance in the recent history of Argentina and it is frequently used when discussing the post-war period.

== Re-malvinización ==
In the years leading up to the thirtieth anniversary of the war in 2012, the Argentine society and media started to renew the claim of the nationalist Falklands cause. This is known as "re-malvinización". As part of this, president Cristina Fernández de Kirchner has criticised the earlier desmalvinización and pledged to make the islands' ownership a central plank of her presidency.

House of Lords member Daniel Hannan says that re-malvinización is designed merely to "distract people from domestic discontents" and to attract new potential voters bringing up a national cause, rather like the original war justification of the leader of the junta, Leopoldo Galtieri, that he intended to make up for the junta's plummeting popularity invading the islands.
