= Alicia Lemme =

Argentine Peronist politician

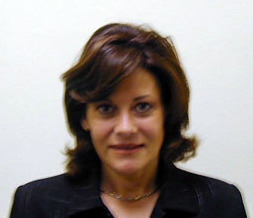

Mayor of San Luis
- In office 11 December 2007 – 10 December 2011
- Preceded by: Alfonso Vergés
- Succeeded by: Enrique Ponce

National Deputy
- In office 10 December 2003 – 10 December 2007
- Constituency: San Luis

Governor of San Luis
- In office 23 December 2001 – 9 December 2003
- Preceded by: Adolfo Rodríguez Saá
- Succeeded by: Alberto Rodríguez Saá

Vice Governor of San Luis
- In office 10 December 1999 – 22 December 2001
- Governor: Adolfo Rodríguez Saá
- Preceded by: Omar Morán
- Succeeded by: Blanca Pereyra

Mayor of Juana Koslay
- In office 1991–1997

Personal details
- Born: 1954 (age 71–72) Villa Mercedes, San Luis, Argentina
- Party: Justicialist Party

María Alicia Lemme (born 1954) is an Argentine Peronist politician. She became Vice Governor of San Luis Province in 1999, deputising for Adolfo Rodríguez Saá, and became Governor of San Luis upon Rodríguez Saá's resignation in 2001.

Notably, Lemme was the first-ever female governor of an Argentine province. Lemme also served as mayor of two cities in San Luis: Juana Koslay (from 1991 to 1997) and the City of San Luis (from 2007 to 2011).

== Biography ==
Born in Villa Mercedes, San Luis Province, Lemme became an architect by profession and served as Mayor of Juana Koslay (1991–97), and in the Provincial Legislature (1997–99). She was elected Vice-Governor of the Province alongside Adolfo Rodríguez Saá in 1999. Rodríguez Saá's appointment as President of Argentina by Congress in December 2001 left Lemme the governorship. She was the first female governor since the restoration of democracy.

Lemme stepped down in 2003, allowing Alberto Rodríguez Saá to stand for election to the Governorship formerly held by his brother Adolfo. Later that year, she and Adolfo were elected as National Deputies.

In 2006, Lemme took a leave of absence from Congress. She was elected as Mayor of San Luis in August 2007 with just over 50% of the vote defeating incumbent Mayor Alfonso Vergés, the candidate of the Front for Victory of then President Néstor Kirchner.
