= Carlos Saa =

Colombian footballer (born 1983)

Personal information
- Full name: Carlos Alfredo Saa Posso
- Date of birth: December 4, 1983 (age 42)
- Place of birth: Candelaria, Valle, Colombia
- Height: 1.82 m (6 ft 0 in)
- Position: Defender

Team information
- Current team: Millonarios
- Number: 2

Youth career
- 2003–2004: América de Cali

Senior career*
Years	Team	Apps	(Gls)
2005–2006	América de Cali	16	(0)
2007	Deportivo Pasto	7	(0)
2008	Botafogo		
2009–2010	Juventus		
2010–present	Millonarios	8	(2)
- * Club domestic league appearances and goals as of November 14, 2010

Carlos Alfredo Saa Posso (born December 4, 1983) is a Colombian football defender, who currently plays for Millonarios in Categoría Primera A.

== Statistics (Official games/Colombian Ligue and Colombian Cup) ==
(As of November 14, 2010)

Year	Team	Colombian Ligue Matches	Goals	Colombian Cup Matches	Goals	Total Matches	Total Goals
2010	Millonarios	8	2	4	0	12	2
Total	Millonarios	8	2	4	0	12	2
