= Argentine argentino =

Former currency of Argentina

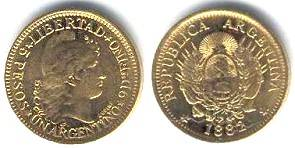
A front and back view of a 1 Argentino coin

The golden Argentino was the only official golden coins made by the Argentine mint from 1881 to 1896, according to law N° 1130, sanctioned in 1881 during the presidency of Julio Argentino Roca.

== Gold currency ==
The Argentino was an Argentine currency equal to 5 pesos oro sellado.

The 1/2 argentino coin was issued in 1881 and 1884 and it weighs 4.0322 grams. The argentino coin was issued from 1881 to 1896 and it weighs 8.0645 grams. Both were made of gold 0.900.

== Planned currency ==
The Argentino was a complementary currency in Argentina announced by then-president Adolfo Rodríguez Saá on December 26, 2001, during the 1998–2002 Argentine great depression. It would have circulated alongside the peso and the dollar. He resigned on December 30, 2001, and this plan was never implemented.

The currency was to replace the Patacón, the LECOP, and other provincial bonds.

== Sources ==
- Krause, Chester L.; Clifford Mishler (1996). Standard Catalog of World Coins: 1801–1900. Colin R. Bruce II and Marian S. Moe (editors) (1st ed.). Krause Publications. ISBN 0873414276.
