= José María Ramos Mejía =

Argentine politician and historian

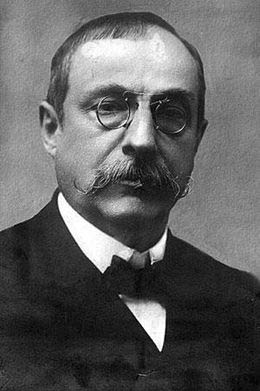
- Born: 1849; Buenos Aires, Argentina
- Died: 1914 (aged 64–65); Buenos Aires
- Education: University of Buenos Aires
- Writing career
- Language: Spanish
- Notable work: Rosas y su tiempo
- Literary movement: Positivism

José María Ramos Mejía (1849–1914) was an Argentine politician and historian.

== Biography ==
He was born in Buenos Aires in 1849, son of colonel Matías Ramos Mejía and Francisca Madero. He made studies of medicine, promoting changes to the academic standards in 1871, which would be achieved between 1873 and 1880. He graduated in 1879, with a thesis about brain trauma.

He kept working at the University of Buenos Aires, and headed the newly created professorship of nerve pathology in 1887. He made further studies of nerve and mental pathology, being considered later as one of the first researchers of psychiatry in Argentina. He was vice president of the Buenos Aires municipal commission in 1882, first director of public assistance in 1883, national deputy between 1888 and 1892, head of the National department of hygiene between 1893 and 1899, and president of the National Council of Education. He died in 1914.

=== Work as historian ===
His first book, "Neurosis de los hombres célebres en la historia argentina" (Spanish: Neurosis of noteworthy men in the history of Argentina) was started during his studies, and published in 1887. His work was influenced by Vicente Fidel López, and influenced later historians as José Ingenieros, Lucio López and Luis Agote.

As a historian, he rejected the current tradition of making studies of history with the point of view fixed on elites or notable key people, but rather on the social groups that promoted those peoples into importance. He considered the Argentine War of Independence as the result of romantic peoples, the Argentine Civil War as the result of aggressive peoples, and his own time period of 1890 as the result of passive peoples.

He included phrenologist analysis of historical peoples, as part of a new wave of positivist historians that sought to combine history with science. However, phrenology is currently rejected as a pseudo-science.

== Works ==
- Neurosis de los hombres célebres en la historia Argentina (1887)
- Las multitudes argentinas (1899)
- La locura en la historia. Contribución al estudio psicopatológico del fanatismo religioso y sus persecuciones (1895)
- Los simuladores del talento en las luchas por la personalidad y la vida (1904)
- Rosas y su tiempo (1907)

== Bibliography ==
- Gelman, Jorge; Raúl Fradkin (2010). Doscientos años pensando la Revolución de Mayo. Buenos Aires: Sudamericana. ISBN 978-950-07-3179-9.
