= Matías Ramos Mejía =

Argentine colonel

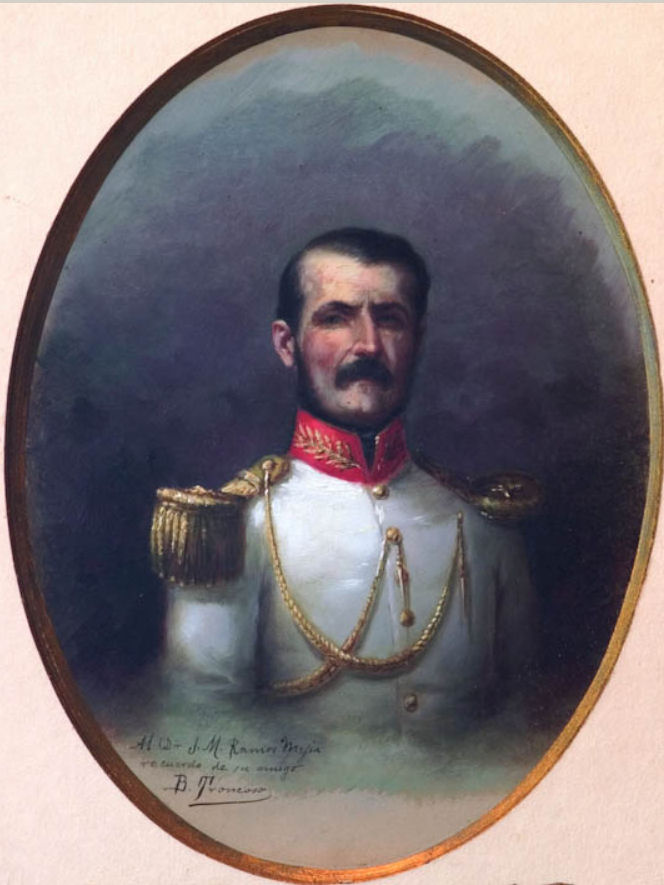
- Portrait of Matías Ramos Mejía, c. 1860.

Personal details
- Born: 1810 Buenos Aires, Viceroyalty of the Rio de la Plata
- Died: 1885 (aged 74–75) Tapiales, Argentina
- Party: Unitarian
- Occupation: Army; Politician
- Profession: Military

Military service
- Branch/service: Argentine Army
- Years of service: c.1827-1874
- Rank: Colonel
- Battles/wars: Argentine Civil Wars

Matías Ramos Mejía (February 24, 1810 - June 11, 1885) was an Argentine colonel. He joined the 1828 coup of Juan Lavalle against Manuel Dorrego, and the 1839 rebellion of the Freemen of the South. He took part in the move of Lavalle's corpse to Potosí. He also fought in the Paraguayan War. He is the father of historian José María Ramos Mejía.

== Biography ==
Matías was born in Buenos Aires, the son of Francisco Ramos Mejía and María Antonia de Segurola. He was married to María Francisca Madero, daughter of Juan José Madero and María del Carmen Viaña, belonging to patrician families of Buenos Aires.

His paternal grandfather was Gregorio Ramos Mejía, a prominent Sevillian politician, who served as perpetual regidor of Buenos Aires.
