= Ricardo Rodríguez Saá =

Argentine physician, politician

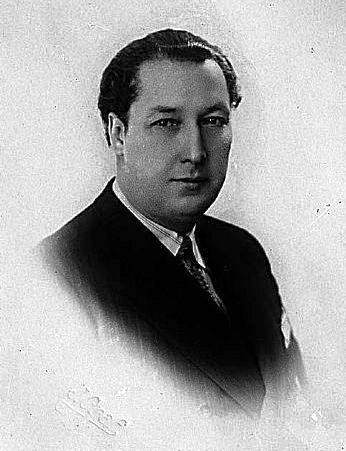

Governor of San Luis Province
- In office 1934–1938

Ricardo Rodríguez Saá was Governor of the San Luis Province in Argentina from 1934 to 1938. His great-nephew, Adolfo Rodríguez Saá, would become President of Argentina. His brother, Adolfo, and another great-nephew, Alberto, have also served as Governors of the San Luis Province.
