= Adolfo Rodríguez Saá (elder) =

Argentine politician (1876–1933)

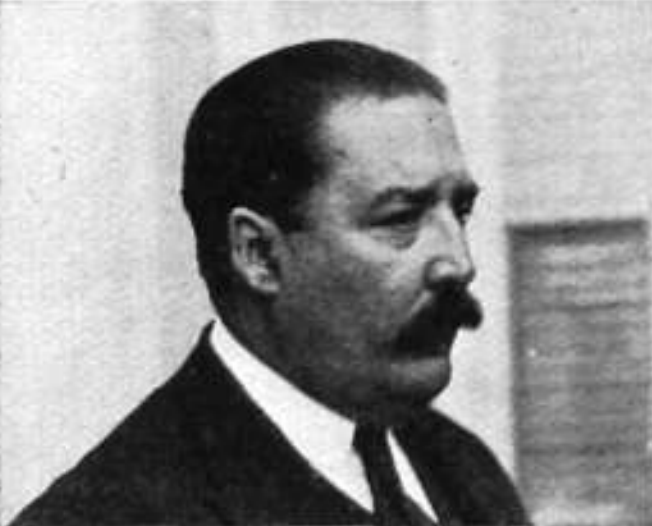
- Rodríguez Saá in 1931

Governor of San Luis Province
- In office 1909–1912

Adolfo Rodríguez Saá was Governor of the San Luis Province in Argentina. His grandson Adolfo Rodríguez Saá, would serve as President of Argentina and governor of San Luis. He was also grandfather and brother of San Luis Province Governors Alberto Rodríguez Saá and Ricardo Rodríguez Saá.
