= List of governors of San Luis =

Governor of San Luis Province
- Provincial coat of Arms

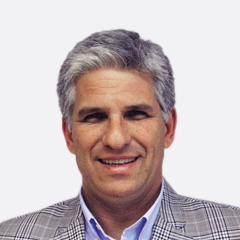
- Incumbent; Claudio Poggi since 10 December 2023
- Appointer: Direct popular vote
- Term length: 4 years
- Inaugural holder: Juan Daract
- Formation: 1913

The governor of San Luis (Spanish: Gobernador de la Provincia de San Luis) is a citizen of San Luis Province, in Argentina, holding the office of governor for the corresponding period. The governor is elected alongside a vice-governor. Currently the governor of San Luis is Claudio Poggi.

== Governors since 1983 ==
Governor	Term in office	Party	Election	Vice Governor
Adolfo Rodríguez Saá	10 December 1983 – 23 December 2001	PJ	1983	—N/a
Adolfo Rodríguez Saá	10 December 1983 – 23 December 2001	PJ	1987	Ángel Rafael Ruiz
Adolfo Rodríguez Saá	10 December 1983 – 23 December 2001	PJ	1991	Bernardo Quincio
Adolfo Rodríguez Saá	10 December 1983 – 23 December 2001	PJ	1995	Mario Merlo
Adolfo Rodríguez Saá	10 December 1983 – 23 December 2001	PJ	1999	María Alicia Lemme
María Alicia Lemme	23 December 2001 – 10 December 2003	PJ	1999	Vacant
Alberto Rodríguez Saá	10 December 2003 – 23 December 2011	PJ	2003	Blanca Pereyra
Alberto Rodríguez Saá	10 December 2003 – 23 December 2011	PJ	2007	Jorge Luis Pellegrini
Claudio Poggi	23 December 2011 – 10 December 2015	PJ	2011	Jorge Raúl Díaz
Alberto Rodríguez Saá	10 December 2015 – Incumbent	PJ	2015	Carlos Ponce
Alberto Rodríguez Saá	10 December 2015 – Incumbent	PJ	2019	Eduardo Mones Ruiz

== See also ==
- Legislature of San Luis
  - Senate of San Luis
  - Chamber of Deputies of San Luis
