= Apagón =

Intentional blackouts for protest

Apagón (in Spanish, literally, blackout) is a form of protest that was employed several times in some large cities of Argentina, during the economic crisis at the beginning of the 2000s. The justification for a blackout as a form of protest was a rejection of the proposed increase of fees of electricity and other basic services.

== Argentina ==
1998–2002 Argentine
great depression

Economy of Argentina
Argentine peso
Convertibility plan
Corralito
Corralón
Cacerolazo
2001 riots
Apagón
Economic emergency law
Debt restructuring

During the 1990s, under the Menem administration, the Convertibility Law guaranteed a fixed exchange rate of 1 U. S. dollar per Argentine peso, and the private companies that supplied electric power, telephone service, natural gas and drinking water, among others, earned consistently high profits, which could be turned into dollars and sent abroad with no loss. A number of these service providers had also secured dollarized fees, contracts that entitled them to ask for increases in their fees subject to the inflation of the United States, and other provisions of the kind.

After the uncontrolled devaluation of the peso in 2002, the profit measured in dollars was diminished proportionally, and their local operating costs in pesos skyrocketed. The service companies asked the national government of Argentina to authorize considerable fee increases (in some cases over 100%). The Duhalde administration rejected the possibility for a while, but finally called for consultation meetings to discuss the matter.

The public reacted angrily to this, accusing the private companies of being greedy and oblivious to the dangerously unstable social environment: half of the population was under the poverty line, unemployment was over 20%, and inflation continued rising. On September 19, 2002, political activists and organizations (Elisa Carrió's ARI, other left-wing parties, piqueteros, the Central de Trabajadores Argentinos, neighbourhood assemblies, etc.) gathered in Plaza de Mayo and called for a widespread intentional "blackout".

On September 24, between 8 and 8.15 p.m., in Buenos Aires and some other large cities, people turned off the lights in their houses and apartments. Many businesses closed their doors and also diminished the lights. In the streets, drivers honked their horns, and there were isolated cacerolazos. The Legislative building of the Autonomous City of Buenos Aires turned off the illumination of its facade.

The actual strength of the blackout was relatively minor, and even then it was mostly concentrated in Buenos Aires, but the combination of the protests was marked by the media. The government postponed the renegotiation of public service fees indefinitely.

== Spain ==
In Spain, since November 2011 there is also a campaign named A-pagón: No pagues centrales nucleares y de carbón (A-pagón: Don't pay for nuclear and coal-fired power stations) related to the avoiding of the augmentative term "pagón" which could be translated as "big payer". The campaign's idea is "Don't pay for electricity until it is produced by 100%-renewable-and-clean methods".

The activists of this campaign argue that "If you don't pay electricity until it would be clean, all the electricity company can do is to disconnect you for a minute, which is the time you need to reconnect it", and also states that "You must maintain always the meter count: in this way the dirty company knows the money it has not incoming, due to using dirty means to produce the electricity".
