= Alberto Rodríguez Saá =

Argentine politician

Alberto Rodríguez-Saá
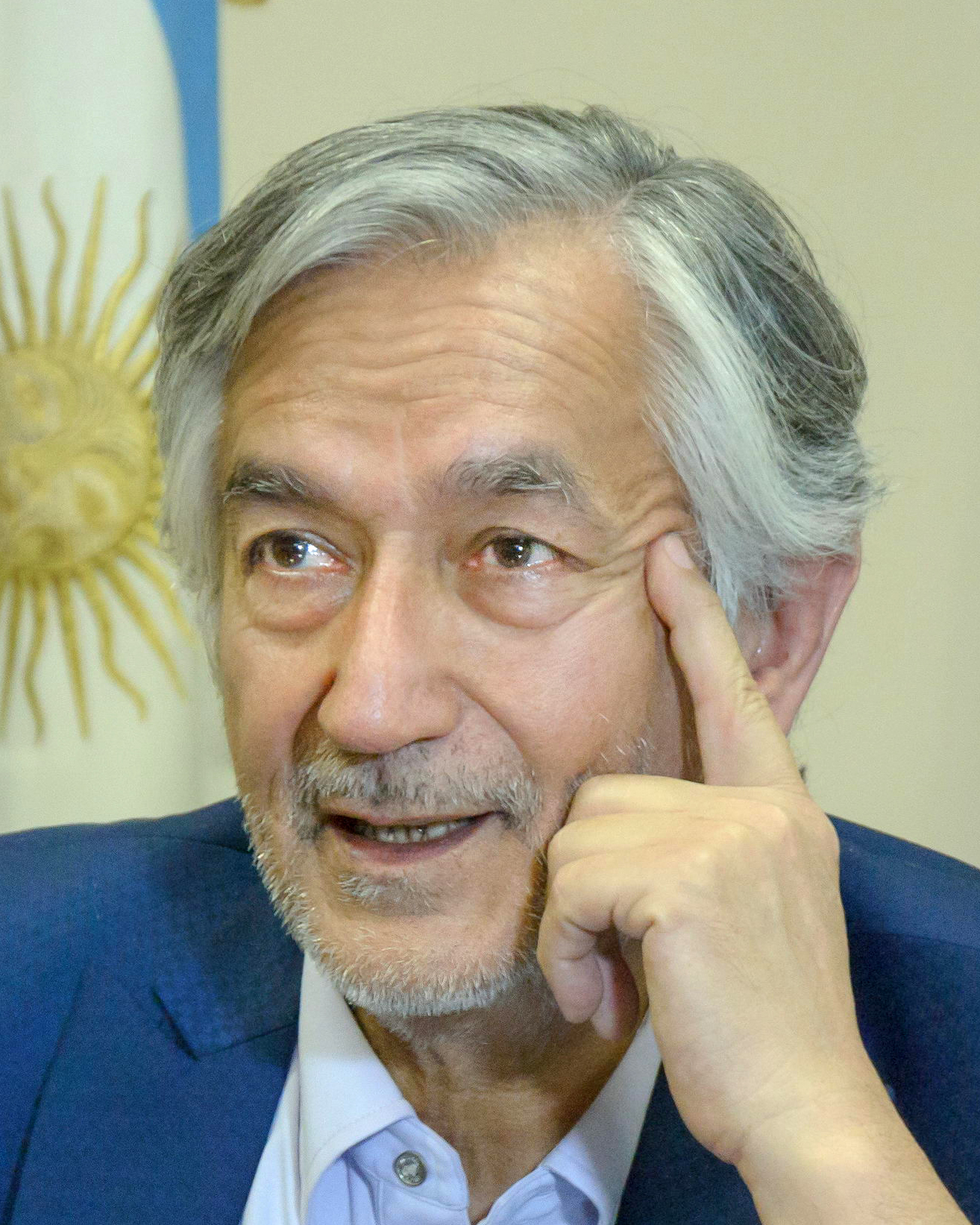

Governor of San Luis
- In office December 10, 2015 – December 10, 2023
- Vice Governor: Carlos Ponce
- Preceded by: Claudio Poggi
- Succeeded by: Claudio Poggi
- In office December 10, 2003 – December 9, 2011
- Vice Governor: Blanca Pereyra (2003-07); Jorge Pellegrini (2007-11)
- Preceded by: Alicia Lemme
- Succeeded by: Claudio Poggi

National Senator
- In office March 8, 2000 – March 14, 2001
- Constituency: San Luis
- In office December 10, 1983 – December 14, 1994
- Constituency: San Luis

Personal details
- Born: August 21, 1949 (age 76) San Luis, Argentina
- Party: Justicialist Party
- Other political affiliations: Justice, Union and Freedom (2007–2011); Federal Commitment (2011–2019)
- Parent(s): Carlos Juan Rodríguez-Saá; Lilia Ester Páez
- Relatives: Adolfo Rodríguez-Saá (brother)
- Profession: Lawyer

Alberto José Rodriguez-Saá (born August 21, 1949) is an Argentine lawyer and politician. He was Governor of San Luis Province on two separate occasions. He was presidential candidate for the center-right peronism, Orthodox and Federal Peronism, in 2007 and 2011.

The Rodriguez-Saá family is well known in the Province of San Luis and can be traced to the nineteenth century and to descendants of the Federalist revolutionary Juan Saá, an important figure in the Argentine Civil Wars of the mid nineteenth century. His brother, Adolfo Rodríguez-Saá, was governor of San Luis from 1983 until 2001, when he became interim President of Argentina, resigning after a week.

== Biography ==
Born in San Luis, Rodriguez Saá completed his undergraduate studies at the University of Buenos Aires, where he earned a law degree in 1974, specializing in Constitutional Guarantees. He married María Antonia Salino, and they had three children; they were later divorced.

He was hired as a legal advisor to the CGT, the nation's largest trade union, in 1980. Between 1983 and 1994, he served as senator for the Province of San Luis. Serving this position in 1986, he voted against the Ley de Punto Final that established the suspension of legal proceedings against the perpetrators of illegal detentions, torture and murder during the military dictatorship. Between 1989 and 1993 he was president of the Justicialist caucus in the Argentine Senate. With presidential aspirations of his own, in October 1993 he voted against the government project to amend the National Constitution and allow the reelection of the then-President Carlos Menem, known as the "Pacto de Olivos". This has been linked to the kidnapping of his brother shortly afterwards. He resigned from his seat in December 1994.

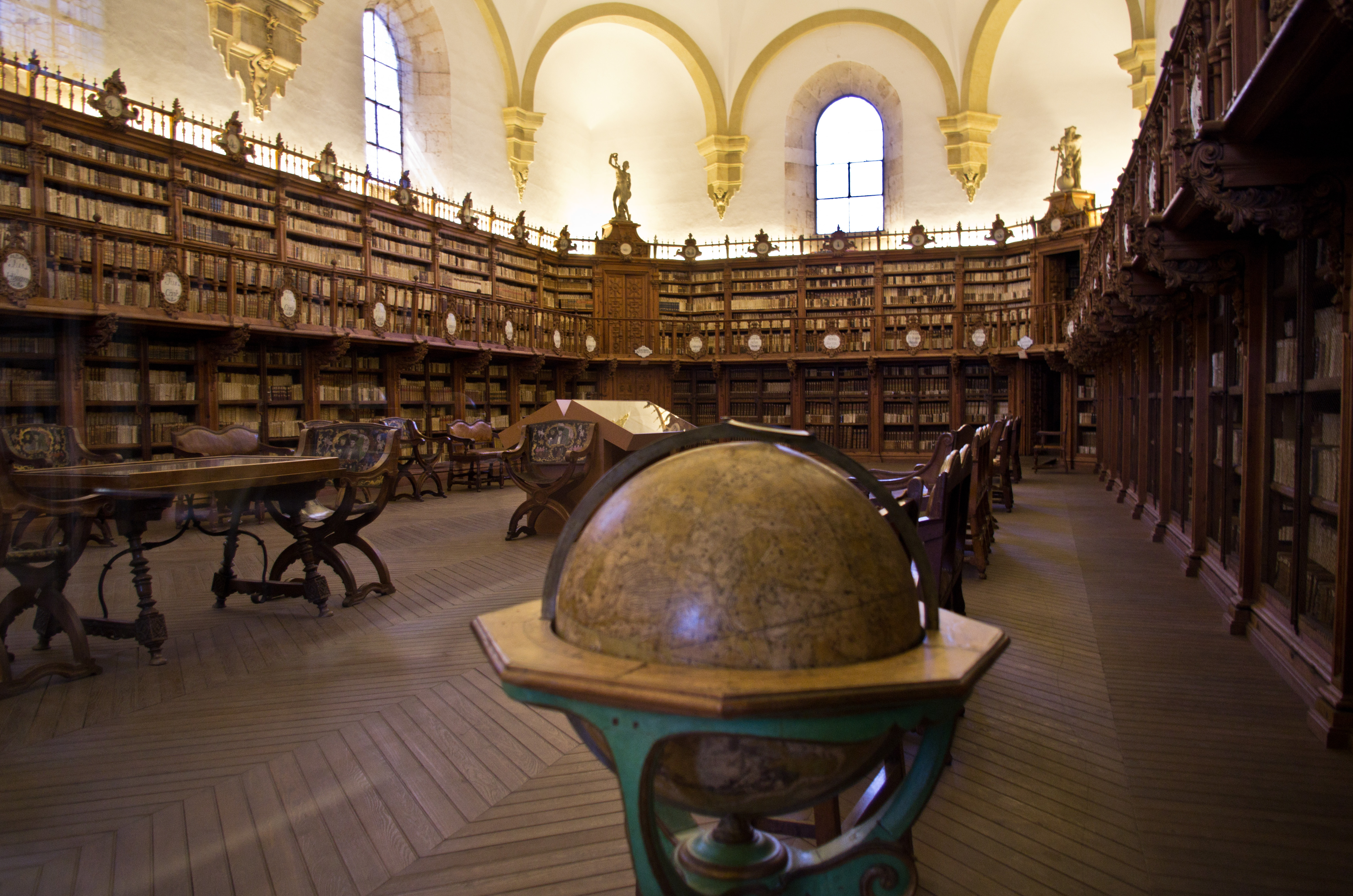
The old library of the University of Salamanca.

Rodriguez Saá completed postgraduate programs at the University of Salamanca, Spain, in constitutional law, community law, and in art history. He developed a strong interest in environmental and artistic activities, promoting the development of cultural proposals on a national scale. Subsequent to his various postgraduate studies in Spain, he returned to Argentina in 2000 and was elected again as National Senator, being one of the four senators who voted against the Labor Flexibilization Law (pejoratively called "Ley Banelco" for the cash bribes offered a number of senators for its passage by President Fernando de la Rúa's administration). He resigned for the Senate in 2001, and served as Head of the Cabinet of Ministers Leadership of San Luis Province. He was elected Governor of the Province in 2003, and was re-elected in 2007 with over 80% of the vote; the runner up, with 12.2% of the vote, was Roque Palma of the Popular Socialist Party.

In 2003 he called for mayoral elections in San Luis, although this exceeded his authority. For a year there were two municipal governments in the city, until the Argentine Supreme Court ruled against Rodriguez Saá and the municipal government his elections had installed was disbanded.

Rodriguez Saa promoted a constitutional amendment blocking indefinite re-election in the Province of San Luis. He ran for president in the 2007 general election, representing the more conservative "internal line" of the Justicialist Party, which opposes Kirchnerism. His coalition won nearly 1.5 million votes in 2007 (7.6%), and earned fourth place in a crowded field.

In 2011, during his second term as Governor of the Province of San Luis, he was distinguished as “Global Ambassador for Peace” by the World Organization for Peace. This award is given to the highest world personalities such as Kofi Annan, former Secretary General of the United Nations. He won the award for his policies in San Luis on "Social Inclusion", "Sustainable Environment", "Health and Work", "Nuclear Nonproliferation," and "General Welfare." He is known to heavily campaign in areas where he is certain of winning the majority of votes. His reason for doing so is not to obtain more votes, but to "monitor" local officials to ensure they are responding to the desires of the populace.

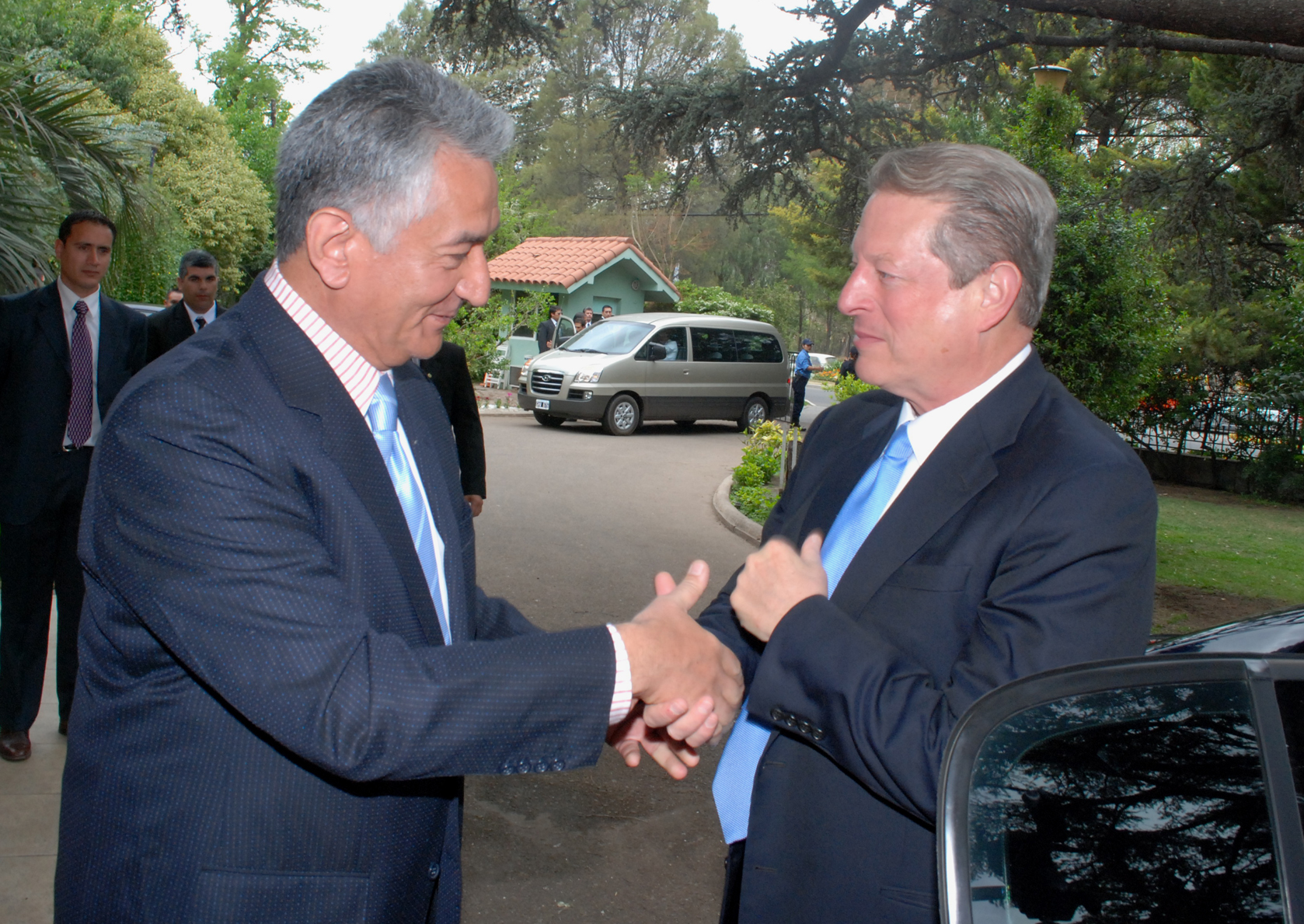
Alberto Rodriguez Saa & Al Gore, San Luis, Argentina, 2009

A friend of former U.S. vice president and Nobel Peace Prize laureate, Al Gore, with whom he has had several meetings in the Province of San Luis, Alberto Rodriguez Saá received several awards from the United Nations Environment Programme (UNEP), and an official acknowledgment from the Senate of Argentina, both for his environmental policies.

Soon after being nominated as Global Ambassador for Peace, Alberto Rodriguez Saá received the Tiradentes Medal, previous winners of which include former Brazilian President Luiz Inácio Lula da Silva and Pope John Paul II. The distinction is in recognition of his humanitarian support including food and aid relief that Rodriguez Saá offered to various Argentine provinces, Brazil, Peru, China, Iran and Haiti; he was also recognized for this by the United States Embassy.

The province of San Luis was voted the best managed in the country by private consultants for the seventh consecutive year, in Tax Efficiency Policy, Social indicators, Infrastructure, Fiscal Solvency and International Trade. Moreover, in its ambition to create a local "Silicon Valley," San Luis came fourth in a ranking of 150 'digital cities' developed by Motorola.

Rodríguez Saá sought the Federal Peronist nomination for the Presidency in 2011. Neither he nor his main rival, former President Eduardo Duhalde, were able to secure a clear majority ahead of the August 14 primaries, however, and each man ran on his own slate: Rodríguez Saá on the Federal Commitment, and Duhalde on the Popular Front. Both were handily defeated by the incumbent, President Cristina Kirchner, though Rodríguez Saá (who earned 1.7 million votes, or 8%) won in his native San Luis Province; he became the only candidate other than Mrs. Kirchner to win in any one jurisdiction.

== International awards and honors ==
"Distinction for his commitment to environmental protection and combating desertification, land degradation and mitigating the effects of drought" (June 2011) delivered by the United Nations Convention to combat desertification.

Recognition to the Government of the Province of San Luis by the Senate of the Argentinian Nation (March 2011), for having signed on September 6, 2010, the Agreement called "Ten Commandments of peace between Progress and the Environment" and for the effective implementation of sustainable development policies. Upon signing the Treaty of Peace between Progress and the Environment, the Provincial Governor Alberto Rodriguez Saa was greeted by three Nobel Peace Prize winners (Wangari Maathai, Osvaldo Canziani, and Perez Esquivel).

"Tiradentes Medal", considered the highest distinction granted by the Carioca State. It is the same award that in previous years was assigned to former Brazilian President Luiz Inácio Lula da Silva and Pope John Paul II.

"Global Ambassador for Peace" (March 2011), the highest distinction made by the World Peace Organization in Geneva, for his policies put forward in San Luis on "Social Inclusion", "Sustainable Environment" "Health and Work", "Nuclear Nonproliferation," and "General Welfare", an honor previously bestowed upon Kofi Annan, former Secretary General of the United Nations.

"Distinction of the United Nations Environment Program" based in Kenya (March 2011) for having planted more than four million trees. Recognition for his environmental leadership by former U.S. VP, Nobel Peace Prize winner Al Gore during his visit to the Province of San Luis (2009)

Participation in the Global Climate Change Convention in Copenhagen 2010, along with the leaders and presidents of all the nations assembled in order to reach an international agreement on climate change.

"Global Leader" (February 2009), a distinction made by the United Nations through the United Nations Program for Environment for his contribution to the Billion Tree Campaign.

== Public office ==
1983–1994: National Senator for the Province of San Luis. In this position he served as:

- President of the General Law Committee
- 1st vice-president of the Peronist bloc (unified) in 1988
- President of the Peronist bloc Honorable Senate of Argentina between 1989 and 1993.

2000: Re-elected Senator by the Province of San Luis.

2001: Chief of Cabinet of the Province of San Luis.

2003: Elected Governor of the Province of San Luis with a mandate until 2007.

2007: Re-elected Governor of the Province of San Luis with a mandate until 2011.

== Academic activity ==
Professor of Labor and Commercial Law at Normal School "Juan Pascual Pringles" National University of San Luis.

Fellow Member of the San Luis History Board.

Honorary President and founder of the ICCED Foundation.

Honorary President and founder of the Institute of Historical and Social Studies "Juan Crisóstomo Lafinur"

Director of the Department of Regional Studies – Provincial Institute of Technology – San Luis

Professor of the Department Regional Studies – Provincial Institute of Technology – San Luis

Founder of "Institute of Legal Editions." San Luis 1999

Professor of the Department of Regional Studies – IUSI

== Published works ==
"The Test of Desmalvinización." Buenos Aires-1985

"Argentine Model for the National Project". Buenos Aires-1986

"Critical Analysis on the national project." Buenos Aires, 1987

"San Luis a destination." San Luis 1997

"Dr. Juan Crisóstomo Lafinur, Notes." San Luis, 1997

"Tragic Cantata to the Death of Colonel Juan Pascual Pringles". San Luis, 2000

"Trilogy in Pringles," San Luis, 2001

Political offices
Preceded by Alicia Lemme	Governor of San Luis; 2003–2011	Succeeded by Claudio Poggi
Preceded by Claudio Poggi	Governor of San Luis; 2015–2023	Succeeded by Claudio Poggi
