= Adolfo Rodríguez Saá =

Interim President of Argentina in 2001

Adolfo Rodríguez-Saá
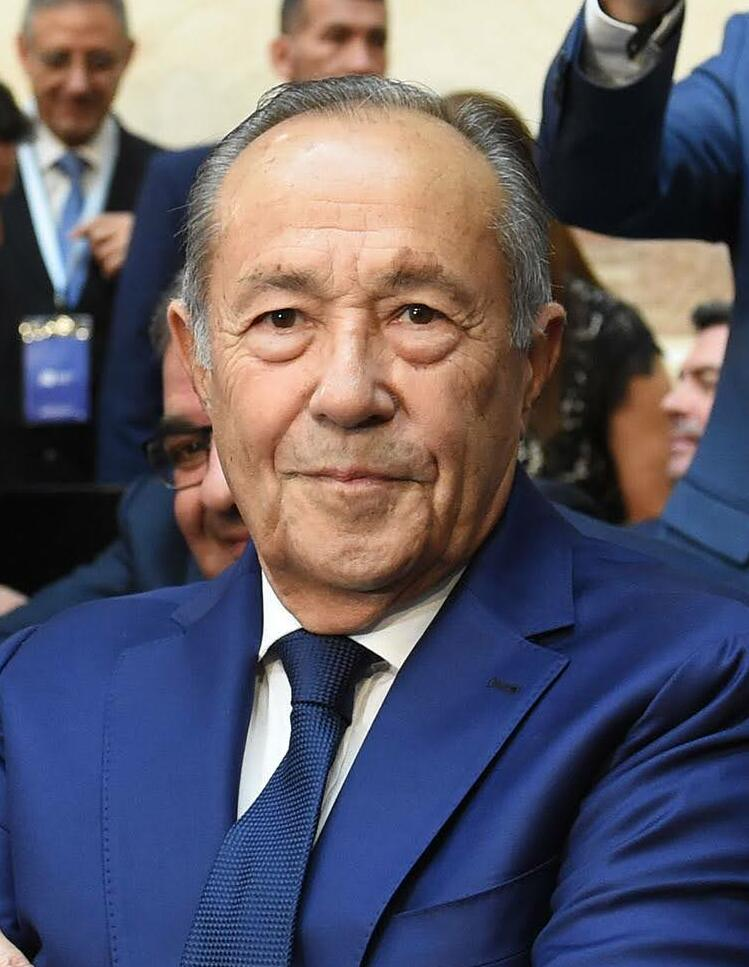
- Rodríguez-Saá in 2023

52nd President of Argentina
- In office 23 December 2001 – 30 December 2001
- Vice President: Vacant
- Preceded by: Ramón Puerta (a.i.)
- Succeeded by: Eduardo Camaño (a.i.)

Governor of San Luis
- In office 10 December 1983 – 22 December 2001
- Vice Governor: See list: Ángel Rafael Ruiz (1987–1991) Bernardo Quincio (1991–1995) Mario Merlo (1995–1999) Alicia Lemme (1999–2001)
- Preceded by: Hugo di Risio (de facto)
- Succeeded by: Alicia Lemme

National Senator
- In office 10 December 2005 – 10 December 2023
- Constituency: San Luis

National Deputy
- In office 10 December 2003 – 9 December 2005
- Constituency: San Luis

Member of the Constitutional Convention
- In office 30 May 1994 – 22 August 1994
- Constituency: San Luis

Personal details
- Born: 25 July 1947 (age 79) San Luis, Argentina
- Party: Justicialist Party
- Other political affiliations: Federal Commitment (2010–2015); Juntos por el Cambio (2019); Frente de Todos (2019–2023)
- Spouse: María Alicia Mazzarino
- Parent(s): Carlos Juan Rodríguez-Saá; Lilia Ester Páez
- Education: University of Buenos Aires

Adolfo Rodríguez-Saá (Spanish pronunciation: [aˈðolfo roˈðɾiɣes saˈa]; born 25 July 1947) is an Argentine Peronist politician. Born in a family that was highly influential in the history of the San Luis Province, he became the province's governor in 1983, after the end of the National Reorganization Process military dictatorship. He remained governor up to 2001, being re-elected in successive elections.

President Fernando de la Rúa resigned in that year, amid the December 2001 riots, and the Congress elected Rodríguez Saá as the president of Argentina. In response to the 1998–2002 Argentine great depression, he declared the highest sovereign default in history and resigned days later amid civil unrest.

The Congress elected a new president, Eduardo Duhalde, in order to complete the term of office of de la Rúa (but Duhalde failed to do so, and eventually that term was completed by Néstor Kirchner, instead). Rodríguez Saá ran for president subsequently in the 2003 and 2015 presidential elections, but the low votes he received meant he was not among the serious contenders, receiving 14.11% of the popular vote in 2003 and 1.99% in 2015.

== Early life ==
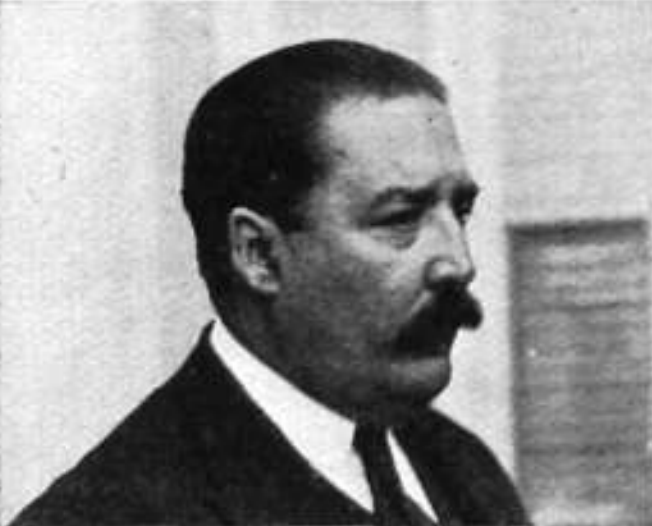
Rodríguez Saá's grandfather Adolfo Rodríguez Saá I, his namesake and governor of the same province

Rodríguez Saá was born to an important political family in San Luis. The Rodriguez Saá family is well known in the Province of San Luis and can be traced to the 19th century and to descendants of the federal caudillo Juan Saá, who fought in the battle of Pavón during the Argentine Civil War. Rodríguez Saá's grandfather and namesake Adolfo Rodríguez Saá and his great-uncle were both governors of the province, and his father was the police chief.

He attended the "Juan Pascual Pringles" school, which was associated with the National University of Cuyo. He studied law at the University of Buenos Aires, graduating in 1971. He worked as a teacher in his former school for two years. He was an editor of the anti-Peronist pamphlet "La voz de San Luis" (Spanish: The voice of San Luis), but became a Peronist in 1969 during his studies in Buenos Aires. He joined the Peronist Youth in the year of his graduation and worked as their representative in San Luis.

The Peronist party, proscribed since 1955, was allowed to run for the 1973 elections. The Peronist party won the elections, and Héctor Cámpora became president. Rodríguez Saá became a provincial legislator, and led the Peronist deputies in the chamber. He joined the right-wing Peronist unions, led by Oraldo Britos. He opposed the governor Elías Adre, who was aligned with left-wing Peronism. After the 1976 Argentine coup d'état, he left politics and worked in a law firm with his brother.

== Governor ==
The National Reorganization Process dictatorship came to an end in 1983, when Raúl Alfonsín won the 1983 elections. Rodríguez Saá was elected governor of San Luis in those elections, in a close contest with the Radical Civic Union. He was helped by the clergy of the province, who opposed the radical candidate because of his secularism.

As a governor, Rodríguez Saá attracted huge investments to the province, which led to the growth of local industries, public works, social services and tourism. Levels of employment and industrial production, as well as measures of scholastic achievement and crime-fighting success were higher than those of the country at large. He was a populist and authoritarian governor who was accused of nepotism, corruption and restricting freedom of the press. He united the governors of the smaller Argentine provinces in a front, called Frente Federal Solidario.

He ran in the primary elections of the Justicialist Party (PJ) for the 1989 presidential elections. Carlos Menem, governor of La Rioja, prevailed in both the primary and the main elections and became the new president of Argentina. Rodríguez Saá was elected to the Constituent Assembly that drafted the 1994 amendment of the Argentine Constitution. He attempted to run in the primary elections for the 1995 presidential elections against Menem, who was seeking re-election. Not seeing any chance of prevailing against the president, he abandoned his candidacy. He also attempted to run in the primary elections for the 1999 presidential elections, and resigned his candidacy again, this time on behalf of Eduardo Duhalde, governor of the Buenos Aires Province. Duhalde lost the elections to the radical Fernando de la Rúa, and Rodríguez Saá was again re-elected as governor. He attempted to divide the city of San Luis into four municipalities, as the mayor was a political rival, but had to drop the project because of the popular unrest generated by the proposal.

== Presidency (2001) ==
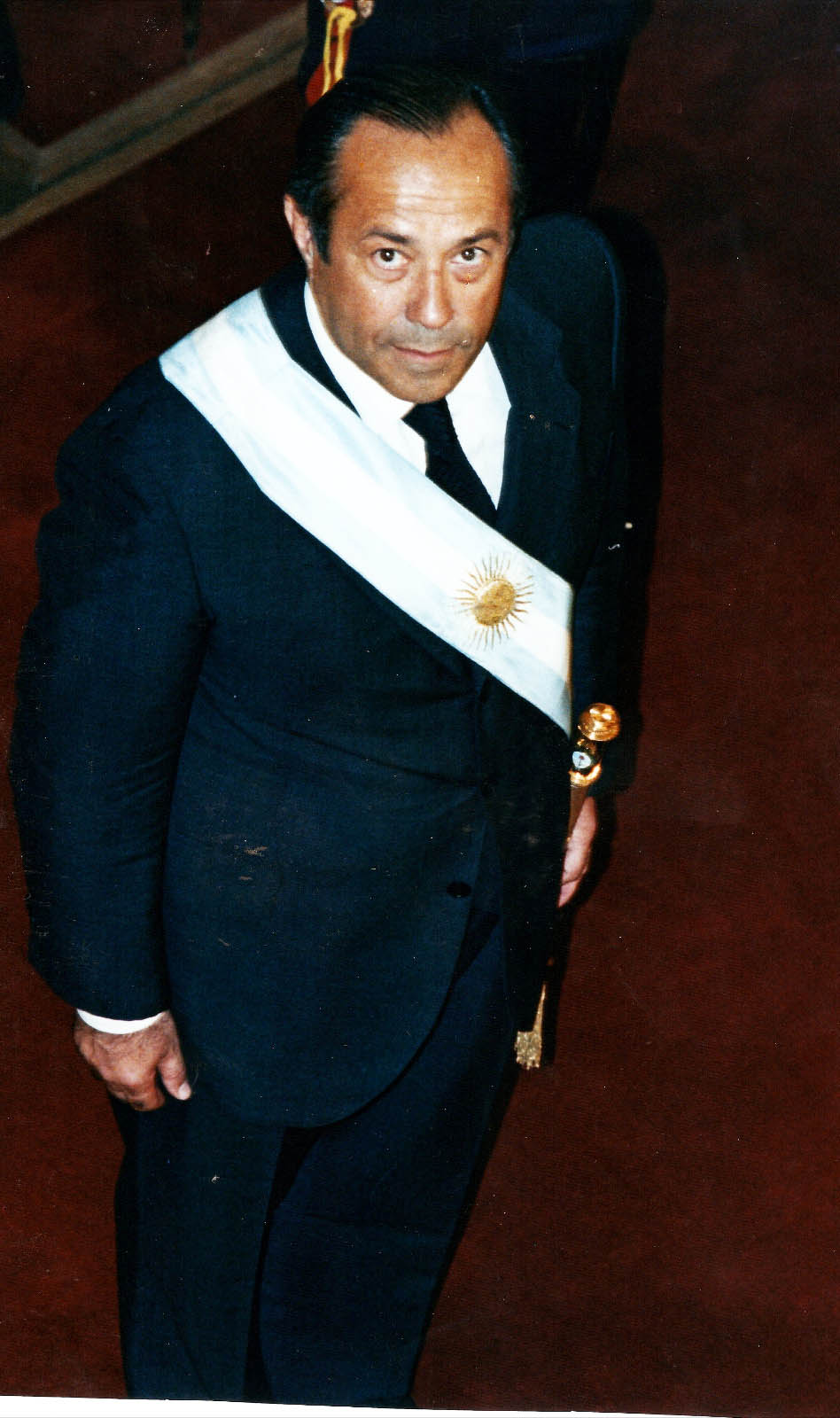
Rodríguez Saá wearing the presidential sash at his inauguration, 2001

President Fernando de la Rúa resigned after the December 2001 riots that had been caused by the 1998–2002 Argentine great depression. As his vice president Carlos Álvarez had resigned as well months before, Congress called for a special assembly to designate a new president. Until then, Ramón Puerta served as acting president from 21 December to 22 December. Adolfo Rodríguez Saá became president after being elected with 169 votes to 138. He was supported by the PJ and smaller right-wing parties such as Republican Force and Action for the Republic. The Unión Cívica Radical (UCR) and Alternative for a Republic of Equals voted against him. He was replaced in the governor's office by vice-governor María Alicia Lemme, and took office on 23 December 2001.

Rodríguez Saá received the mandate of president with instructions from the Assembly to call for elections the following 3 March, with a ballotage round on 17 March if needed. The new president would complete de la Rúa's term of office. Those elections were to be held under the ley de lemas with double simultaneous voting, with the victor scheduled to take office on 5 April.

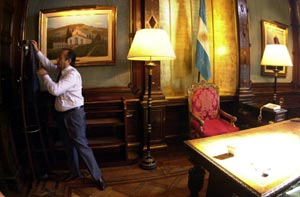
Adolfo Rodríguez Saá at his office in the Casa Rosada

During his short time in office, Rodríguez Saá announced the creation of a new currency, the argentino, which would have circulated alongside the peso and the dollar. The civil unrest of previous days resurfaced when he announced the composition of his cabinet that, although having well known and respected figures such as Luis Lusquiños and Oraldo Britos, it also included Carlos Grosso as Chief of the Cabinet of Ministers. Grosso was an unpopular former mayor of Buenos Aires. As a result, Rodríguez Saá gave up his whole cabinet before they could take office, with the sole exception of Rodolfo Gabrielli, in the Interior Ministry. He also declared a sovereign default on the Argentine national debt, which was celebrated by the chamber of deputies. It was the highest sovereign default in history. Those measures, uncharacteristic of a president with a brief term of office, were resented by the leaders of the Justicialist party.

Rodríguez Saá prepared a budget bill for 2002, which was sent to the Congress. It included an important decrease in the deficits, as requested by Anne Krueger from the International Monetary Fund. Krueger also requested a new coparticipation law, to determine the way the nation and the provinces manage tax revenues. Rodríguez Saá called for a meeting with governors in Chapadmalal, but only six governors out of twenty-three attended: Carlos Ruckauf, Juan Carlos Romero, Gildo Insfrán, Ángel Mazza, Carlos Rovira and Alicia Lemme. José Manuel de la Sota, governor of Córdoba, withdrew his support, suspecting that Rodríguez Saá had plans to cancel the elections and stay as president up to 2003. On 30 December, he returned to San Luis with Daniel Scioli and resigned, alleging lack of support from the rest of the Justicialist Party. Insfrán, Maza and minister Rodolfo Gabrielli tried to convince him to stay as president; his brother Alberto Rodríguez Saá supported his decision. In announcing his resignation in a Cadena nacional, he recounted the achievements of his one-week administration and accused Justicialist governors and legislators of meanness and shortsightedness. He dispatched his resignation from San Luis to Buenos Aires, and the Congress accepted it on 1 January 2002. The Senate chairman Ramón Puerta would have been the interim president, but resigned as well, so Eduardo Camaño, president of the Chamber of Deputies, was appointed interim president instead. After new deliberations, they elected Eduardo Duhalde as president, this time with a mandate that would fill the remaining time of de la Rúa's mandate.

== Post-presidency ==
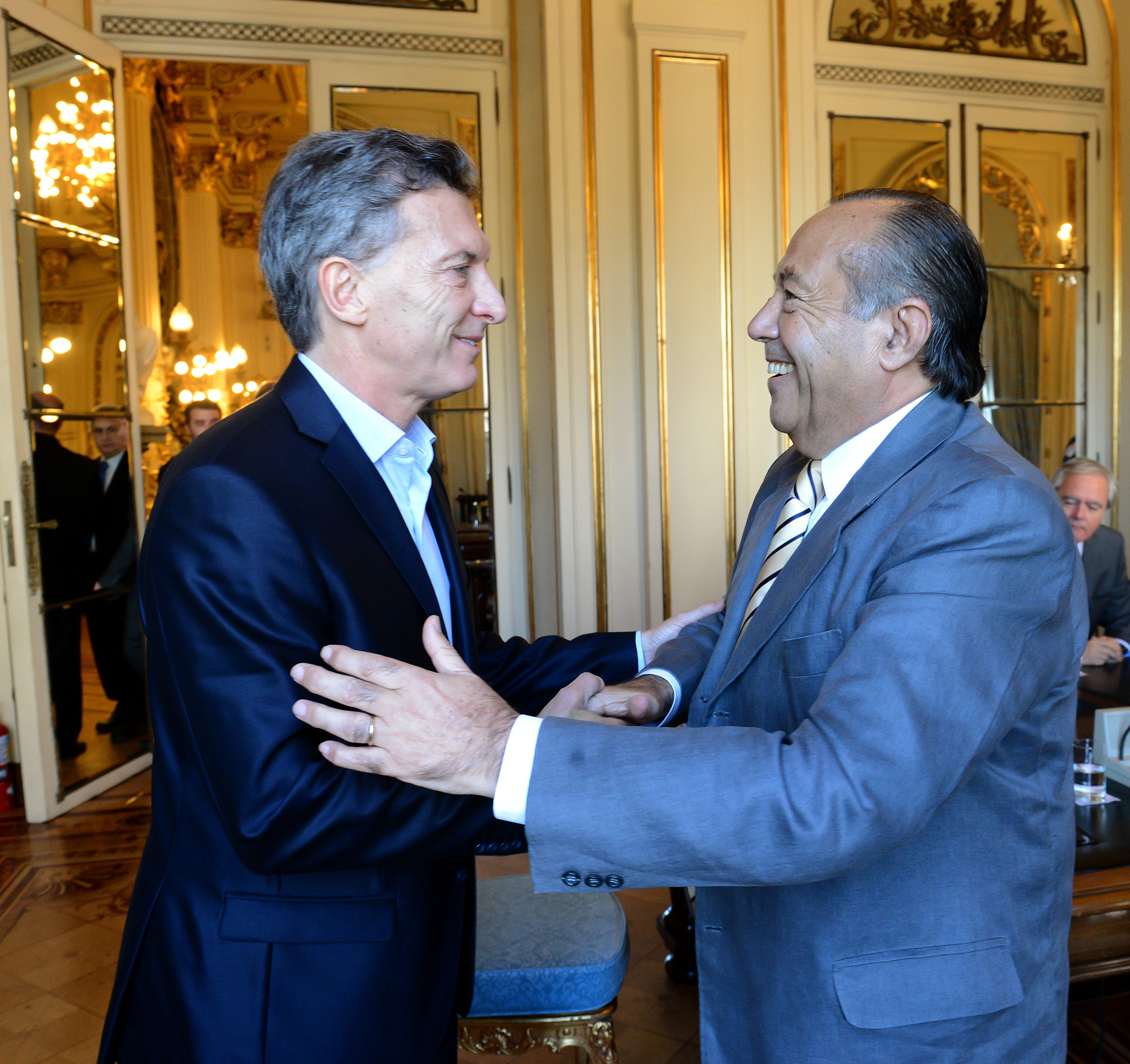
Rodríguez Saá with President Mauricio Macri in 2015

After the end of Eduardo Duhalde's term, Rodríguez Saá ran for the presidency in the April 2003 elections. Those elections allowed the Lemas law, and the PJ did not provide an official candidate. Each precandidate was allowed instead to run for presidency on his own "lema", and Rodríguez Saá did so. The other candidates of the PJ were Néstor Kirchner and Carlos Menem. Rodríguez Saá came in fourth, with 14.1% of the vote, behind both of the other PJ candidates and Ricardo López Murphy. Kirchner became the president of Argentina after those elections.

Rodríguez Saá's brother Alberto Rodríguez Saá became the new governor of San Luis in 2003. Together with Carlos Menem, they attempted to create an alternative political group against Kirchner within the PJ. Adolfo Rodríguez Saá was elected Senator for San Luis representing this group at the 2005 election. He was reelected in 2011, with a term of office up to 2017. He tried to run for governor of Buenos Aires Province in 2011, but the local judiciary did not allow him, as he did not have the required time living in the province. The mayor Sergio Massa organized the coalition United for a New Alternative to run for the 2015 presidential election and invited Rodríguez Saá to join, but he refused to join and ran with his own party, Federal Commitment. With 1.64% of the vote, it was the least voted party in the national elections. He later joined the Juntos por el Cambio of the then-President Mauricio Macri in June 2019 but left the coalition and joined the Frente de Todos of President Cristina Kirchner in December 2019.

== Personal life ==
Adolfo Rodríguez Saá was kidnapped on 21 October 1993. He was governor of San Luis at the time. He was taken to a room in the hotel "Y no C" and forced to perform for a pornographic video. He was forced to pay a ransom of 3 million dollars and was left in the trunk of a car. The video has never been made public, and the kidnappers Walter Alejandro Salgado, Nélida Esther Sesín and Eduardo Alberto Doyhenard were sentenced in 1995. The trial took 11 days, and it included the testimonies of 132 witnesses. It was aired on live television. Esther Sesín claimed during the trial that she had been his lover for eight years. All the kidnappers have served their sentences and currently live in other provinces.

Rodríguez Saá has worked as a cattle rancher in San Luis since his defeat in the 2003 elections.

== Bibliography ==
- Levitsky, Steven (2005). Argentine Democracy: The Politics of Institutional Weakness. United States: The Pennsylvania State University. ISBN 0-271-02716-9.
- Mendelevich, Pablo (2010). El Final. Buenos Aires: Ediciones B. ISBN 978-987-627-166-0.
- Reato, Ceferino (2015). Doce noches [Twelve nights] (in Spanish). Argentina: Sudamericana. ISBN 978-950-07-5203-9.

Political offices
Preceded by Fernando De la Rúa	President of Argentina; 2001	Succeeded by Eduardo Camaño
Preceded by Hugo di Rissio (de facto)	Governor of San Luis; 1983-2001	Succeeded by Alicia Lemme
