= List of companies of Argentina =

Location of Argentina

Argentina is a federal republic in the southern half of South America. Sharing the bulk of the Southern Cone with its neighbor Chile to the west, the country is also bordered by Bolivia and Paraguay to the north, Brazil to the northeast, Uruguay and the South Atlantic Ocean to the east, and the Drake Passage to the south.

Benefiting from rich natural resources, a highly literate population, a diversified industrial base, and an export-oriented agricultural sector, the economy of Argentina is Latin America's third-largest, and the second largest in South America. It has a "very high" rating on the Human Development Index and a relatively high GDP per capita, with a considerable internal market size and a growing share of the high-tech sector.

For further information on the types of business entities in this country and their abbreviations, see "Business entities in Argentina".

== Notable firms ==
This list includes notable companies with primary headquarters located in the country. The industry and sector follow the Industry Classification Benchmark taxonomy. Organizations which have ceased operations are included and noted as defunct.

Notable companies Status: P=Private, S=State; A=Active, D=Defunct
Name	Industry	Sector	Headquarters	Founded	Notes	Status	
Aero Boero	Industrials	Aerospace	Morteros	1956	Aircraft	P	A
AeroDreams	Industrials	Defense	Buenos Aires	2001	Airline	P	A
Aero VIP	Consumer services	Airlines	Buenos Aires	1999	Airline, defunct 2010	P	D
Aerolíneas Argentinas	Consumer services	Airlines	Buenos Aires	1949	State-owned airline	S	A
Agrinar	Industrials	Commercial vehicles & trucks	Santa Fe	2002	Tractors	P	A
Al Este	Consumer goods	Distillers & vintners	Buenos Aires	1999	Winery	P	A
Aleph Producciones	Consumer services	Broadcasting & entertainment	Buenos Aires	1990	Film	P	A
Aluar	Basic materials	Aluminum	Buenos Aires	1970	Aluminium	P	A
Ámbito Financiero	Consumer services	Publishing	Buenos Aires	1976	Newspaper	P	A
América 24	Consumer services	Broadcasting & entertainment	Buenos Aires	2005	Television network	P	A
América TV	Consumer services	Broadcasting & entertainment	La Plata	1966	Television network	P	A
Argentina Sono Film	Consumer services	Broadcasting & entertainment	Buenos Aires	1933	Film	P	A
Aroma Café	Consumer services	Restaurants & bars	Buenos Aires	1991	Coffee chain	P	A
ASA Aluminium Body	Consumer goods	Automobiles	Buenos Aires	1969	Racing cars	P	A
Austral Líneas Aéreas	Consumer services	Airlines	Buenos Aires	1957	Airline, defunct 2020	P	D
Banco Credicoop	Financials	Banks	Buenos Aires	1979	Cooperative bank	P	A
Banco de la Nación Argentina	Financials	Banks	Buenos Aires	1891	State-owned bank	S	A
Banco Macro	Financials	Banks	Buenos Aires	1976	Private bank	P	A
Banco de la Ciudad de Buenos Aires	Financials	Banks	Buenos Aires	1878	Municipal bank	S	A
Banco Patagonia	Financials	Banks	Buenos Aires	1976	Private bank	P	A
BAPRO	Financials	Banks	La Plata	1822	State bank	S	A
BD Cine	Consumer services	Broadcasting & entertainment	Buenos Aires	1995	Film	P	A
Belgrano Cargas	Industrials	Railroads	Buenos Aires	1999	Cargo rail, defunct 2013	P	D
Bernardin	Industrials	Commercial vehicles & trucks	Buenos Aires	1925	Tractors and combines	P	A
Bersa	Industrials	Defense	Ramos Mejía	1955	Firearms	P	A
Bridas Corporation	Oil & gas	Exploration & production	Buenos Aires	1948	Oil and gas	P	A
Bunge y Born	Consumer goods	Food products	Buenos Aires	1884	Food processing	P	A
Canal 9	Consumer services	Broadcasting & entertainment	Buenos Aires	1960	Television network	P	A
Cerveza Quilmes	Consumer goods	Brewers	Quilmes	1888	Brewery	P	A
Chincul	Industrials	Aerospace	San Juan	1972	Aircraft	P	A
Cicaré Helicópteros	Industrials	Aerospace	Buenos Aires	1972	Aircraft, helicopters	P	A
CITEDEF	Industrials	Defense	Buenos Aires	1954	Arms research	S	A
Clarín Group	Consumer services	Broadcasting & entertainment	Buenos Aires	1999	Media holding	P	A
Córdoba Central Railway	Consumer services	Railroads	Buenos Aires	1888	Railway, defunct 1939	P	D
Correo Argentino	Industrials	Delivery services	Buenos Aires	1826	Postal services	S	A
Coto	Consumer services	Food retailers & wholesalers	Buenos Aires	1970	Supermarket chain	P	A
Cris Morena Group	Consumer services	Broadcasting & entertainment	Buenos Aires	2002	Youth media	P	A
Discos Qualiton	Consumer services	Broadcasting & entertainment	Rosario	1961	Record label	P	A
Editorial Atlántida	Consumer services	Publishing	Buenos Aires	1918	Publishing, part of Televisa (Mexico)	P	A
Editorial Losada	Consumer services	Publishing	Buenos Aires	1938	Publishing	P	A
El Sitio	Consumer services	Broadcasting & entertainment	Buenos Aires	1997	Online portal, defunct 2001	P	D
El Trece	Consumer services	Broadcasting & entertainment	Buenos Aires	1960	Television network, part of Clarín Group	P	A
Enarsa	Oil & gas	Exploration & production	Buenos Aires	2004	State-owned petroleum and natural gas	S	A
Fábrica Argentina de Aviones (FAdeA)	Industrials	Aerospace	Córdoba	1927	Aircraft	P	A
FaSinPat	Industrials	Building materials & fixtures	Neuquén	2005	Ceramic tiles	P	A
Ferrobaires	Consumer services	Travel & tourism	La Plata	1993	Passenger rail	P	A
Ferrocarriles Argentinos	Industrials	Railroads	Buenos Aires	1949	Railway, defunct 1993	P	D
Ferrocentral	Consumer services	Travel & tourism	Buenos Aires	2004	Passenger rail, defunct 2014	P	D
Ferroexpreso Pampeano	Industrials	Railroads	Buenos Aires	1991	Cargo rail, part of Techint	P	A
Ferrosur Roca	Industrials	Railroads	Buenos Aires	1993	Cargo rail, part of Mover Participações	P	A
Ferrovías	Consumer services	Travel & tourism	Buenos Aires	1994	Passenger rail	P	A
Grupo Arcor	Consumer goods	Food products	Arroyito	1951	Confectionery	P	A
Grupo Financeiro Galícia	Financials	Banks	Buenos Aires	1905	Financial services	P	A
Guacamole Films	Consumer services	Broadcasting & entertainment	Buenos Aires	2002	Film	P	A
Havanna	Consumer goods	Food products	Mar del Plata	1948	Food	P	A
Hotel Bauen	Consumer services	Hotels	Buenos Aires	1978	Hotel	P	A
Industrias Kaiser Argentina (IKA)	Consumer goods	Automobiles	Córdoba	1956	Automotive, defunct 1970	P	D
INVAP	Industrials	Heavy construction	Bariloche	1976		P	A
Inversiones y Representaciones Sociedad Anónima (IRSA)	Financials	Real estate holding & development	Buenos Aires	1943	Real estate development	P	A
La Anónima	Consumer services	Food retailers & wholesalers	Buenos Aires	1908	Supermarket chain	P	A
La Martina	Consumer services	Apparel retailers	Buenos Aires	1985	Apparel	P	A
La Nación	Consumer services	Publishing	Buenos Aires	1870	Daily newspaper	P	A
La Serenísima	Consumer goods	Beverages	Buenos Aires	1929	Dairy	P	A
LADE (Líneas Aéreas Del Estado)	Consumer services	Airlines	Buenos Aires	1940	Airline	S	A
Líneas Aéreas Federales	Consumer services	Airlines	Buenos Aires	2003	State-owned airline	S	A
Líneas Aéreas Privadas Argentinas	Consumer services	Airlines	Buenos Aires	1977	Airline, defunct 2003	P	D
Loma Negra	Industrials	Building materials & fixtures	Buenos Aires	1926	Cement, owned by Mover Participações	P	A
MercadoLibre.com	Technology	Internet	Buenos Aires	1999	E-commerce	P	A
Molinos Río de la Plata	Consumer goods	Food products	Buenos Aires	1902	Food	P	A
Mostaza	Consumer services	Restaurants & bars	Buenos Aires	2001	Restaurant chain	P	A
Motomel	Consumer goods	Automobiles	Buenos Aires	1992	Motorcycles	P	A
Municipal Bank of Rosario	Financials	Banks	Rosario	1869	Bank	P	A
Newsan	Consumer goods	Consumer electronics	Ushuaia	1991	Electronics	P	A
NGD Studios	Technology	Software	Buenos Aires	2002	Games	P	A
Nostromo Defensa	Industrials	Aerospace	Córdoba	2006	defence	P	A
Noticias	Consumer services	Publishing	Buenos Aires	1976	Weekly magazine	P	A
Nucleosys	Technology	Software	Buenos Aires	2003	Video games, defunct 2009	P	A
Nuevo Central Argentino	Industrials	Railroads	Rosario	1992	Railway	P	A
Nuevos Ferrocarriles Argentinos	Industrials	Railroads	Buenos Aires	2015	Railway	S	A
Página/12	Consumer services	Publishing	Buenos Aires	1987	Newspaper	P	A
Pampa Energía	Utilities	Multiutilities	Buenos Aires	2005	Electricity and natural gas	P	A
Patagonik Film Group	Consumer services	Broadcasting & entertainment	Buenos Aires	1996	Film	P	A
Pixart	Technology	Software	Buenos Aires	1998	Software	P	A
Pol-ka	Consumer services	Broadcasting & entertainment	Buenos Aires	1994	Television and film	P	A
RGB Entertainment	Consumer services	Broadcasting & entertainment	Buenos Aires	2000	Production	P	A
SanCor	Consumer goods	Beverages	Sunchales	1938	Dairy	P	A
Schneider	Consumer goods	Brewers	Buenos Aires	1995	Brewery	P	A
SEMTUR	Consumer services	Travel & tourism	Rosario	2002	Passenger/bus services	P	A
Servicios de Transportes Aéreos Fueguinos	Industrials	Delivery services	Buenos Aires	1985	Cargo airline, defunct 2005	P	D
Servicios Ferroviarios del Chaco	Consumer services	Travel & tourism	Buenos Aires	1999	Passenger rail, defunct 2010	P	D
Servicios Ferroviarios Patagónico	Consumer services	Travel & tourism	Buenos Aires	1993	Tourism railway	P	A
Southern Fuegian Railway	Consumer services	Travel & tourism	Tierra del Fuego	1909	Heritage railway	P	A
Tandanor	Industrials	Defense	Buenos Aires	1879	Shipyard	P	A
Techint	Conglomerates	-	Buenos Aires	1945	Industrials, co-headquartered in Milan (Italy)	P	A
Telecom Argentina	Telecommunications	Fixed line telecommunications	Buenos Aires	1990	Local telecom	P	A
Telefe	Consumer services	Broadcasting & entertainment	Buenos Aires	1961	Television network	P	A
Torneos y Competencias	Consumer services	Broadcasting & entertainment	Buenos Aires	1982	Sports communications	P	A
Transportadora de Gas del Sur	Oil & gas	Exploration & production	Buenos Aires	1992	Natural gas	P	A
Trapiche	Consumer goods	Distillers & vintners	Mendonza	1883	Winery	P	A
Tregar	Consumer goods	Beverages	Santa Fe	1940	Dairy	P	A
Trenes de Buenos Aires	Consumer services	Travel & tourism	Buenos Aires	1995	Passenger rail, defunct 2012	P	D
Trenes Especiales Argentinos	Consumer services	Travel & toruism	Buenos Aires	2003	Passenger rail, defunct 2011	P	D
Tucumán Ferrocarriles	Consumer services	Travel & tourism	Buenos Aires	1997	Passenger rail, defunct 2000	P	D
TV Pública Digital	Consumer services	Broadcasting & entertainment	Buenos Aires	1951	Television network	P	A
Unidad de Gestión Operativa Ferroviaria de Emergencia (UGOFE)	Consumer services	Travel & tourism	Buenos Aires	2005	Passenger rail, defunct 2014	P	D
Vassalli Fabril	Industrials	Commercial vehicles & trucks	Firmat	1949	Tractors and harvesters	P	A
Yacimientos Carboníferos Río Turbio	Basic materials	Coal mining	Río Turbio	1994	Mining	S	A
YPF	Oil & gas	Exploration & production	Buenos Aires	1922	Oil and gas	S	A
Zanella	Consumer goods	Automobiles	Buenos Aires	1948	Motorcycles	P	A

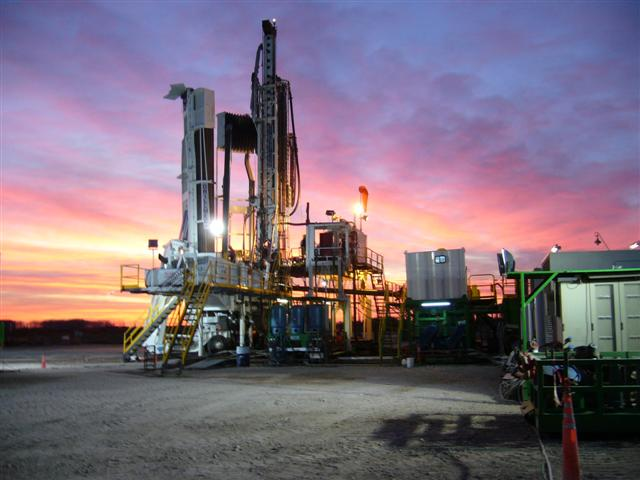
YPF petroleum perforation in General Roca, Rio Negro Province.

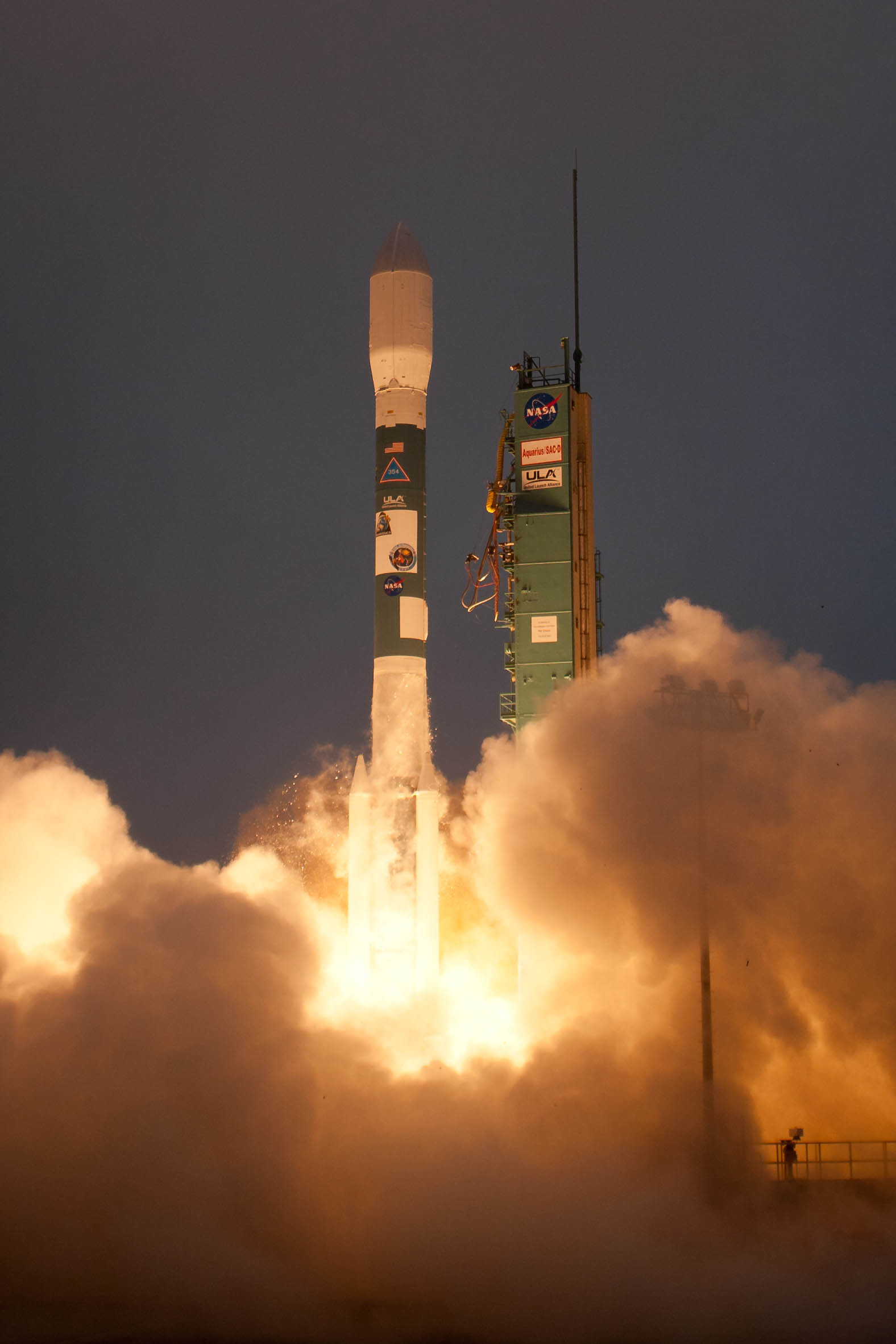
SAC-D is an Argentine earth science satellite built by INVAP.

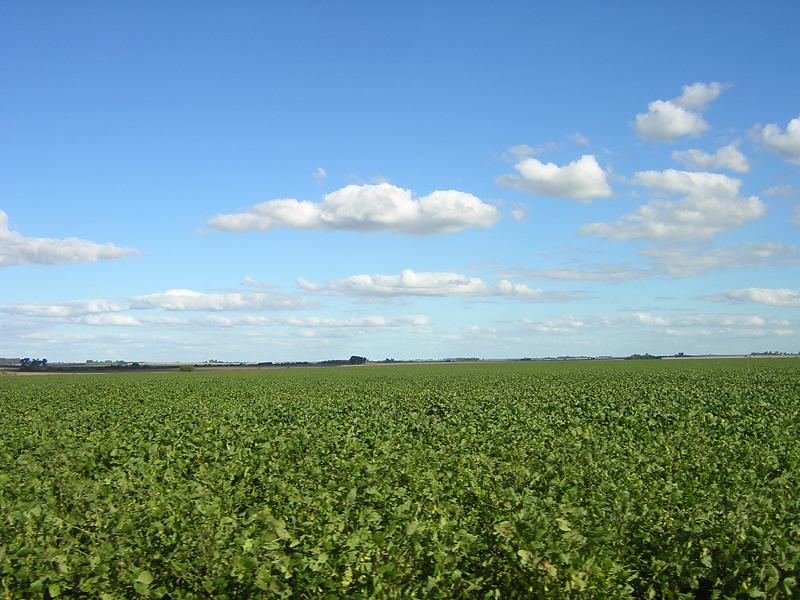
Soy field in Argentina's fertile Pampas.

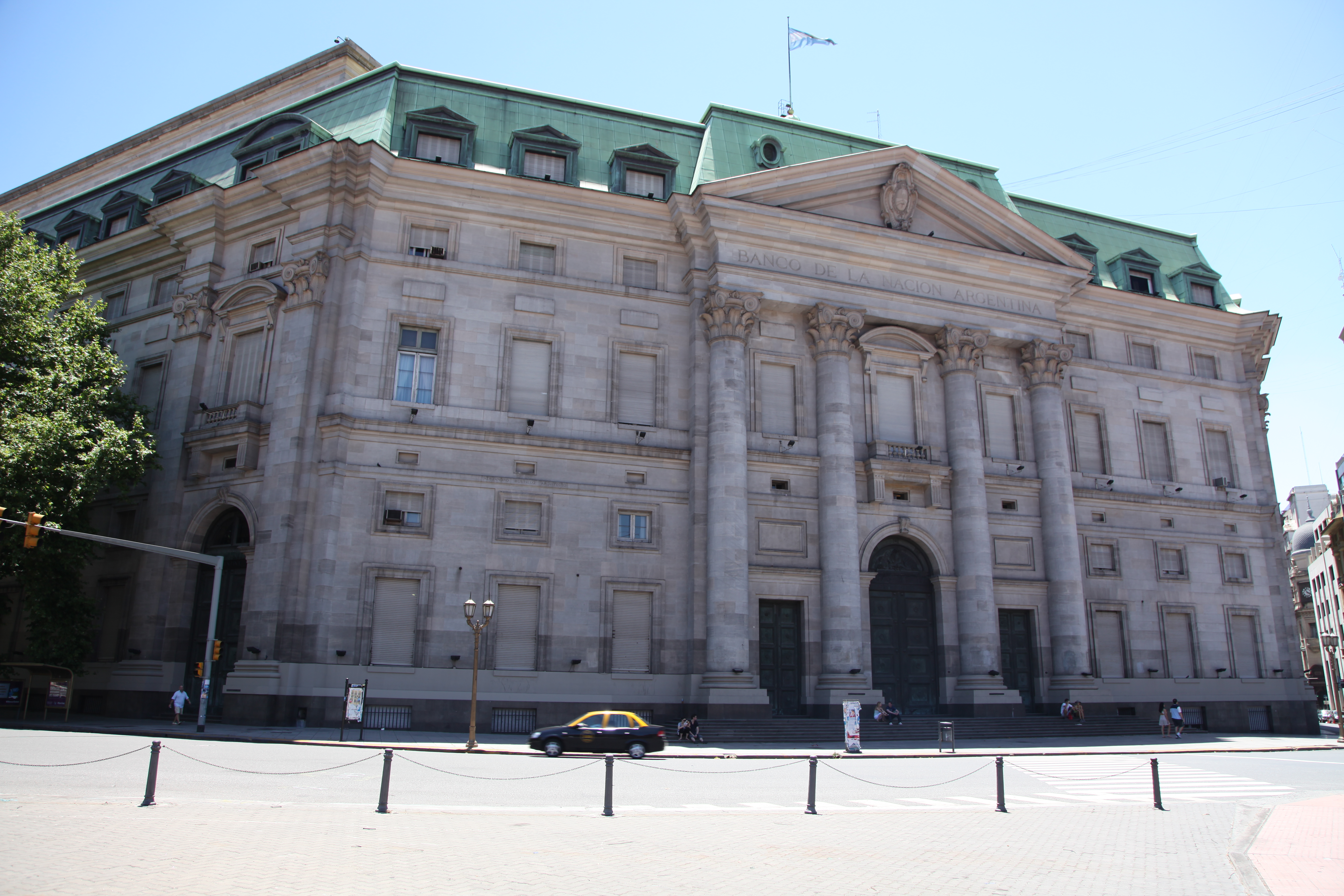
Headquarters of the Banco de la Nación Argentina.
