= Industry in Argentina =

Industry or manufacturing in Argentina is the creation or production of goods with the help of equipment, labor, machines, tools, and chemical or biological processing or formulation in Argentina. It is Argentina's secondary sector of the economy. Argentina's first wave of industrialization occurred during its Belle Époque when the country experienced a surge of immigration and became incorporated into the global economy. Scholars estimate that Argentine industry grew by an annual rate of 5–8% between the 1870s—when factories were "virtually non-existent" in the country—and 1913.

With industrial production of US$79.8 billion in 2023 (19% of GDP), Argentina is the third-largest industrial power in Latin America after Mexico and Brazil. Argentina’s industrial base includes small and medium-sized enterprises as well as large domestic and multinational manufacturing facilities. Argentina is rich in natural resources, with a relatively skilled workforce, Argentina exported almost US$45 billion in manufactured goods in 2023.

Argentine industry is dominated by food processing, chemicals, motor vehicles, metals, and machinery and equipment, which together account for 85% of gross value added in manufacturing. These sectors are either the result of Argentina's comparative advantage in agriculture and energy or reflect government policy to promote strategic industries.

Although Argentine manufacturers have been negatively impacted by shortages of foreign currency and imported parts, as well as decreased demand due to the economic downturn that started in mid-2023, global and domestic companies have continued to invest in Argentine industry given the country's long-term potential.

== History ==
Proto-industrial activity dates back to the first human settlement, approximately 14,000 years ago. During the pre-Columbian era, the indigenous peoples who inhabited the territory that is now Argentina, which included the Diaguita, Guaraní, Mapuche, and other groups, produced goods such as textiles, weapons, handicrafts, and canoes. Their early technological sophistication was demonstrated by the use of loom weaving and the development of an elaborate ceramics industry.

During the Spanish colonial period, the interior region of Argentina was the centre of economic activity due to its pre-Columbian population density and geographical proximity to the silver mines at Potosí in what is now Bolivia. A small export industry emerged around Tucumán, which by 1600 had become a center of cloth production using cotton supplied by indigenous forced labor under the encomienda system. Minor industries producing tradable goods had emerged by 1750 in Córdoba (glassworks), Santiago del Estero (cochineal dyes), Corrientes (coarse frieze and sack cloths), and Misiones (barrels and river barges). For the most part, however, proto-industry in the interior existed primarily on a subsistence basis to meet local or household needs due to low productivity, transportation barriers, and limited demand. Even the export trade with Potosí delined after 1800 due to a decline in silver output.

Production of cattle hides from the region around Buenos Aires became a large-scale export industry during the 18th century, driven by increased demand for leather in Europe. French merchants arrived after the Philip V of Spain awarded a slave asiento concession to the French Guinea Company in 1702; between 1708 and 1712, French merchants purchased an estimated 175,000 hides. British merchants took over the hide trade after 1714, when the Treaty of Utrecht transferred the asiento to the British South Sea Company. With local administrators encouraging export diversification, production of beef jerky by saladeros for slave plantations in Brazil and Cuba became an important activity after 1780. Given this commercial expansion, a limited artisanal industry emerged in Buenos Aires focused on craft products such as leather shoes and silverwork where raw materials were abundant and inexpensive. Local production of other goods would be constrained by labor scarcity, lack of raw materials, and competition from British imports.

The industrial structure established pre-independence remained largely intact during the first half-century post-independence. In the interior, local protectionism and high transportation costs enabled handicraft industry, particularly textiles, to survive. As late as 1869, Argentina's census identified almost 100,000 textile producers in the interior provinces (95% of the national total) where they comprised 20% of the labor force. In Buenos Aires and the neighboring Littoral, production of cattle hides, tallow, and beef jerky flourished in the mid-19th century. Beef jerky exports increased by 7% annually from independence to the mid-1870s while hide exports were supported by supply interruptions in competitors such as Russia. Few other industrial activities developed during this period. Although Argentina enjoyed a boom in wool exports during the mid-19th century, these exports consisted of raw wool rather than processed goods such as yarns or woolens. Meanwhile, due to free trade policies, demand for consumer goods in Buenos Aires and the Littoral was met primarily by European imports rather than by local artisans or the inefficient craft industries of the interior.

=== Emerging industry 1870–1930 ===
Argentina's first wave of industrialization occurred during its Belle Époque when the country experienced a surge of immigration and became incorporated into the global economy. Scholars estimate that Argentine industry grew by an annual rate of 5–8% between the 1870s – when factories were "virtually non-existent" in the country – and 1913. As a result of this rapid expansion, large industrial interests controlled by multiple families. Families including the Tornquists (sugar, meatpacking, metals), Devotos (paper, textiles), Bembergs (beer, sugar), Grimoldis (shoes), and Noels (candy, canned goods) among others, emerged during this period.

Local manufacturing received a significant boost under Argentine president Nicolás Avellaneda, who in 1876 responded to an economic downturn by abandoning the gold standard and increasing duties on imported goods, leading to a period of import substitution. Meanwhile, an influx of European immigrants after 1875 brought both increased consumer demand as well as the human capital required to sustain domestic manufacturing. However, as many firms had a restricted access to capital, industrial establishments during this era consisted predominantly of artisan workshops focused on low-cost or made-to-order production for the domestic market. As late as 1913, the local textile industry supplied less than 20% of Argentina's domestic consumption.

Large-scale export industries emerged during the early 1900s. Argentina's frigoríficos were built by American interests, which by 1914 controlled between one half and two thirds of beef exports. The 1920s saw Argentina move into a secondary phase of industrialization with the emergence of new sectors such as automobile assembly, rubber products, chemicals, and machinery. By the late 1920s, there were already over 50,000 industrial establishments producing approximately 20% of GDP.

=== Import substitution 1930–1975 ===
Light industry expanded, beginning in the 1930s and accelerating under Juan Perón, including Argentina's brief emergence as an exporter of manufactured goods during World War II. Heavy industry expanded in the 1960s and by 1970, Argentina had a modern industrial base that produced steel, petrochemicals, and motor vehicles. However, Argentine industry relied heavily on protection from imports. An emphasis on non-traditional exports was successful but costly.

Industrialization deepened with the onset of the Great Depression and accelerated during World War II due to shortages of imported goods. The most dynamic industries were consumer goods, household electric appliances, and simple machinery and metal products. The Argentine government promoted industries through import restrictions and low-cost credit (often with negative real interest rates) through the Banco Industrial. However, constraints on growth emerged by the 1950s, as recurring balance of payments crises created shortages of imported equipment and inputs, while entrepreneurs faced technological obsolescence and struggled to expand into more complex and higher-value products.

Argentine manufacturers expanded production during wartime shortages. Exports of manufactured goods increased from US$10 million in 1938 (2% of total exports) to US$131 million in 1946 (11% of total exports). However, this expansion was reversed due to the reconstruction of Western European industry and the shift back to civilian production in the United States. By 1949, manufactured exports had fallen to only US$21 million, comprising 2% of total exports—the same level as before the war.

Under President Frondizi's developmentalism model, foreign capital and technology were welcomed to build capital-intensive heavy industry. The dynamic sectors during this period were motor vehicles, steel, and petrochemicals. By the early 1970s, Argentina possessed a diversified industrial base. However, these industries were inefficient due to a lack of scale, extensive vertical integration, and excessive product differentiation. Argentine manufacturing was also characterized by underdeveloped capital goods industries and limited production of intermediate goods such as steel, aluminum, and paper.

With a saturated domestic market and the need to generate foreign currency, successive Argentine governments starting in the mid-1960s promoted industrial exports through financial incentives and managed trade agreements. Exports of manufactured goods increased from US$250 million in 1970 (14% of total exports) to US$1.9 billion in 1980 (23% of total exports).

=== Deindustrialization 1975–2002 ===
The military regime that ruled Argentina from 1976 to 1983 attempted to liberalize the economy. Under Economy Minister José Alfredo Martínez de Hoz, public policy emphasized the sinceramiento of the economy (roughly translated as 'making the economy sincere') based on comparative advantage. During the first two years of the military administration, industrial production continued to grow despite a reduction of tariffs from an average of 90% in 1976 to 50% in 1978; historians credit the improved scale and competitiveness during the export promotion era of the early 1970s. However, after 1978, rising interest rates and overvaluation of the peso as part of Martínez de Hoz's anti-inflation strategy resulted in an influx of imported goods that overwhelmed local industry. This economic liberalization extended through the Menem era.

Stabilization programs during the 1980s, designed to address hyperinflation and the foreign debt crisis, led to further deterioration of local industry. Between 1980 and 1990, industrial output decreased by 24%, and industrial employment fell by 30%. Industry experienced a "regressive restructuring" that undermined the technology, experience, and human capital accumulated during the four decades of import substitution. Yet even under these challenging conditions, key industrial subsectors continued to expand, particularly in intermediate goods and the processing of exported primary goods.

Manufacturing experienced mixed performance during the 1990s. Prior to 1998, high economic growth and regional integration under Mercosur led to a recovery in industrial production and the entry or return of global multinationals such as General Motors and Toyota into local manufacturing. However, even during this more favorable period, growth in manufacturing lagged the overall economy; in particular, the currency overvaluation under the Convertibility Plan led to a loss of competitiveness and a "hollowing out" of small-scale manufacturers. Argentine industry was severely affected by the 1995 "Tequila" crisis in 1995, the 1999 currency devaluation in Brazil, and the 2001–2002 economic crisis as the Convertibility system collapsed.

=== Industry 2003–2024 ===
There was extensive protectionism under the Kirchners that resulted in distortions such as the electronics industry in Tierra del Fuego. Industry did expand, driven by growth in consumer spending. But the outlook is uncertain today under Milei's shock therapy, a potential Mercosur-EU trade deal, and questions on what a more market-driven economic structure would look like for Argentina.

== Sectors ==
Argentine industry is dominated by two major sectors – food, beverages, and tobacco; and chemicals and petroleum products – that reflect the country's comparative advantage in agriculture and energy. Combined, these two sectors drove 55% of total industrial production in 2023. A further 30% of total industrial production was generated by three additional sectors – motor vehicles; metal products; and machinery and equipment – that are considered strategic and receive significant protection from global competition.

=== Food, beverages, and tobacco ===
With Argentina ranking as one of the world's leading food suppliers, food processing is the country's dominant industrial activity. In 2023, the sector was responsible for over 30% of total industrial production and 9% of GDP. Furthermore, manufactured goods of agricultural origin drove 36% of total exports and generated a US$10 billion trade surplus in 2023.

Soybean crushing is a major profile export-oriented industry subsector. Due in part to tax incentives, over 80% of Argentina's soybean harvest is processed into soybean meal and oil (as opposed to being sold as unprocessed beans), compared with 60% in the United States and 35% in Brazil. As a result, Argentina is typically the world's top exporter of soybean co-products with 40–50% global market share. Over 300 oilseed crushing plants operate in the country with 80% of processing capacity located near the city of Rosario. Major companies in the sector include locally owned Aceitera General Deheza, Vicentín, and Molinos agro, and multinationals Bunge, Cargill, Louis Dreyfus Company, and Viterra (whose Argentine plant is the largest soybean crushing facility worldwide).

Beef processing was historically focused on exports but until the 2024 economic downturn, 85% of production was destined for the domestic market. Of the approximately 450 slaughter plants that operate in Argentina, only one third possess the required international certifications to be eligible to export and the industry is periodically subject to export restrictions intended to stabilize domestic prices. Yet Argentina remains the world's fifth largest beef exporter. The two largest beef exporting companies in Argentina are Brazilian agribusiness giants JBS and Marfrig, which together control over 30% of the country's export capacity. The largest locally owned processors include Frigorífico Gorina, ArreBeef, Friar, EcoCarnes, and La Anónima, which combined control an additional 40% of export capacity.

Similarly, Argentina was once a leading exporter of wheat flour but today over 90% of production is consumed domestically; at the same time, Argentina remains the world's seventh largest exporter of wheat flour. Approximately 180 flour mills operate in the country with the 10 largest facilities accounting for approximately 50% of total production; 90% of capacity is located in the provinces of Buenos Aires, Córdoba, and Santa Fe. Over 100 of these mills were installed between 2001 and 2014, which has contributed to overcapacity and low profitability in the sector.

Consumer food and beverage production in Argentina is predominantly oriented to the domestic market. Leading locally owned companies in this segment are Molinos Río de la Plata, which owns a diversified portfolio of local food brands, and Grupo Arcor, a confectionery producer. Global multinationals are active in the sector and have acquired many major domestic brands such as Quilmes beer (owned by Ambev) and La Serenísima dairy products (owned by Danone). However, there are instances where Argentine companies have acquired foreign-owned brands, such as Molinos Río de la Plata's purchase of the Sibarita frozen pizza brand from Canadian multinational McCain Foods in September 2024. Recent investments in Argentina's packaged foods sector include regional bottler Coca-Cola Andina's US$40 million reopening of a bottling plant in Mendoza in November 2024, creating 200 new direct and indirect jobs, and local pork processor Paladini's US$10 million expansion of its plant in Santa Fe province, also in November 2024.

=== Chemicals and petroleum derivatives ===
Producers of chemicals, refined petroleum products, and other fuels, plastics, pharmaceuticals, and household soaps and detergents generated almost 25% of total industrial production (equivalent to 7% of GDP) in 2023. In addition, the sector generated US$5.5 billion in exports, or 8% of the country's total in 2023.

==== Chemicals and petrochemicals ====
According to Argentina's chemical and petrochemical industry association (Cámara de la Industria Química y Petroquímica) the 180 companies operating in the sector directly employ 64,000 workers. YPF and Pampa Energía are the major domestic companies in the sector; multinationals operating in Argentina include Dow Chemical, BASF, and Bunge. The sector is well represented outside of the country's dominant industrial centers with major facilities in Bahía Blanca and the provinces of San Luis, Mendoza, and Neuquén.

Argentina exported US$4.5 billion in chemical products in 2023; however, the sector generated a US$7.3 billion trade deficit since local production only covers 60% of market needs. The Vaca Muerta shale formation, which contains the world's second largest unconventional natural gas and fourth largest unconventional petroleum reserves, has been identified as offering opportunities for expanding chemical output. Industry leaders report that the quality and price of Argentine natural gas is ideal for the chemicals industry and would alleviate feedstock shortages throughout Latin America; however, the pipelines and other infrastructure necessary to transport shale gas to industrial centers are still in development.

A key recent investment was the expansion of global chemicals company Evonik's biofuels facility in Rosario announced in July 2024 to increase production capacity by 50% and enable exports to Brazil. However, other multinationals are reducing operations in or exiting the Argentinine market entirely. Dow Chemical announced the closure of its petrochemicals plant at San Lorenzo (Santa Fe province) in October 2024 due to the facility's low utilization rate and excess global supply of its key product, polyether polyols. Petroquímica Río Tercero, a local company, also announced a plant closure in October 2024 impacting a toluene diisocyanate production facility in Córdoba province. Canadian fertilizer producer Nutrien announced its plan to divest its Argentine fertilizer business in April 2024, although the company did not disclose its intentions for Profertil, a joint venture with YPF that produces urea and ammonia for the agrichemicals market.

==== Petroleum refining and other fuels ====
Refining is dominated by four large companies—Axion Energy (subsidiary of BP), Raízen (subsidiary of Shell), Trafigura, and YPF. Local companies Refinor, Refisan (subsidiary of Perez Companc), and Destilería Argentinas de Petróleo also operate in the sector. The industry typically supplies 80% of domestic demand for gasoline and diesel. Significant investments in refinery modernization have been made in recent years, including a recently completed US$1.5 billion project by Axion to expand capacity and reduce sulfur dioxide emissions by 99% at its Campana facility, an ongoing US$600 million investment by YPF to expand capacity and produce low sulfur fuels at its Luján de Cuyo facility, and a US$600 million plant modernization announced by Raízen in April 2024.

Argentina's biofuels sector is relatively small with production of 1.12 billion liters of bioethanol and 1.65 billion liters of biodiesel per year compared to 31.66 billion liters of bioethanol and 6.37 billion liters of biodiesel in Brazil. 60% of Argentina's bioethanol is corn-based; the remainder is made from sugarcane with 12 major production facilities located in the provinces of Salta, Tucumán, and Jujuy; biodiesel is predominantly made from soybeans. After several stagnant years, the sector may return to growth due to a US$200 million investment by Grupo Bahía Energía announced in October 2024 to build Argentina's first sustainable aviation fuel plant that will use corn-based ethanol.

==== Pharmaceuticals ====
Pharmaceuticals account for 5% of total industrial production. Argentina has over 200 pharmaceutical plants with 43,000 employees. Over US$800 million of production is exported to neighboring Latin American countries every year. Local companies such as Roemmers and Elea Phoenix dominate the industry; only two of Argentina's top 10 pharmaceutical companies by revenue are subsidiaries of foreign multinationals (Sanofi and Bayer).

==== Plastics ====
According to the Cámara Argentina de la Industria Plástica, approximately 2,750 production plants operate in Argentina's plastics sector, employing over 50,000 workers.

Dow Chemical, Ampacet Corp., Amcor, and BASF operate in Argentina.

==== Soaps, detergents, and personal care products ====
The soaps and detergents market is dominated by Unilever, which was estimated in 2013 to hold a 70% market share in Argentina. Procter & Gamble, which sold its Argentine operations to local consumer products company Grupo Newsan, held a 20% market share. Grupo Queruclor is the largest locally owned company in the space with 2% market share; in 2014, the company expanded by acquiring a portfolio of brands from Colgate-Palmolive. The Clorox Company sold its Argentine brands and production facilities to investment firm Apex Capital in 2024.

=== Motor vehicles ===
See Automotive Industry in Argentina

The automotive sector is the third-largest industrial subsector, driving 10% of total industrial production, 10% of total exports, and 3% of GDP in 2023. Twelve multinational companies operate assembly plants in the country, employing more than 25,000 workers. An additional 48,000 Argentines were employed by over 200 auto parts manufacturers.

Argentina's automotive supply chain is strongly integrated with its Brazilian counterpart under Economic Complementarity Agreement (ECA) 14, a managed trade agreement that guarantees a share of bilateral production to each country. When ECA 14 was last renewed in 2019, the two countries committed to implementing free trade in motor vehicles by 2029. Brazil and Argentina entered a separate agreement in August 2022 to remove a key non-tariff barrier related to vehicle safety certifications in both countries.

Despite the economic downturn, several global automakers have announced major investments in Argentina. In February 2024, Toyota announced a US$50 million investment to produce the Hiace utility vehicle at its plant in Zárate, creating 100 local direct and indirect jobs. Mercedes-Benz announced construction of a new bus and truck plant, also in Zárate, in March 2024; this new plant will complete the company's US$110 million investment cycle initiated in 2021. Stellantis announced US$270 million in investment at its El Palomar factory in April 2024 and a further US$385 million at its Ferreyra facility in September 2024.

=== Metals ===
The metals sector—led by aluminum and steel—drove 10% of industrial production and 3% of GDP in 2023.

Argentina was the fifth-largest exporter of aluminum to the United States during the first nine months of 2024 due to Aluar, a locally owned company that operates the country's sole aluminum smelter. Located in Puerto Madryn (Chubut Province), the plant has 2,000 employees and annual production capacity of 460,000 tons. Aluar exports 70% of its production and is a rare example of an Argentine manufacturer with significant export sales not only to the United States but also to other developed markets such as Germany and Japan.

Steel industry leaders include multinationals Acindar (subsidiary of ArcelorMittal), Gerdau, and Tenaris, as well as locally owned Acerbrag, Techint, and Sidersa. Ninety percent of Argentine steel consumption is supplied via domestic production.

Steel producer Acindar, a subsidiary of ArcelorMittal, suspended production nationwide for a month in March 2024 due to the sudden decrease in demand. A three-week suspension was announced for its Villa Constitución plant in Santa Fe province in June 2024; the company also disclosed that its total production would decrease from 1.2 million tons in 2023 to only 600,000 tons in 2024.

In June 2024, local steel company Sidersa announced a US$300 million investment in a next-generation steel mill in San Nicolás. The new plant will create 300 new jobs and is expected to export 30% of its production.

=== Machinery and equipment ===
==== Agricultural equipment ====
Argentina has a diverse agricultural equipment sector that employs 47,000 skilled workers and is the main source of employment in small rural areas. Over 700 companies, which include both multinationals such as John Deere and CNH as well as an network of SMEs, produce farm machinery and inputs in Argentina, supplying 80% of local demand. Almost 90% of these companies are located in the provinces of Córdoba, Santa Fe, and Buenos Aires. In addition, Argentina has a growing cluster of over 20 companies that provide global markets with farm machinery electronics and software.

Despite a strong rebound in agricultural production in 2024, the sector has been affected by Argentina's economic downturn. The industry association for agricultural equipment manufacturers, Asociación de Fábricas Argentinas de Tractores y otros equipamientos Agrícolas e Industriales (AFAT), disclosed that its members suffered a 50% drop in production during the first six months of 2024.

As a result, John Deere announced layoffs amid protracted wage negotiations at its main plant in Granadero Baigorria in Santa Fe Province.

At the same time, PLA, an Argentina sprayer and planter manufacturer acquired by John Deere in 2018, announced a US$15 million investment in March 2024 to expand production capacity at its Las Rosas plant by 50%.

==== Consumer electronics ====
Approximately 95% of the cell phones, televisions, air conditioners, and microwaves sold in Argentina are produced in Tierra del Fuego Province due to generous tax exemptions introduced by the military government in 1972 and import restrictions implemented by the Kirchner administration in 2009. Locally owned companies such as Grupo Newsan and Mirgor employ 8,500 workers in the Tierra del Fuego Free Zone and an additional 500 workers in other provinces to assemble consumer electronics under license using imported parts. In 2023, the sector produced 2.4 million television sets, 9.8 million mobile phones, and 1.5 million air conditioners.

Samsung and Motorola are the top mobile phone brands produced by Argentine licensees with a combined 75% market share. Amid the current economic crisis, Argentine manufacturers have introduced more affordable Chinese mobile phone brands such as Nubia Technology, Infinix Mobile, Tecno Mobile, and Oppo into the local market.

However, there are product segments where Argentine manufacturing is regionally competitive, including home appliances. Whirlpool opened a US$52 million facility in October 2022 to manufacture front-loading washing machines, with plans to export 70% of its output to Brazil, Chile, Uruguay, Paraguay, and Bolivia.

=== Other sectors ===
==== Textiles ====
The textiles, apparel, and leather goods sector accounts for approximately 4% of industrial production, 1% of GDP, and 1% of total exports. Yet the sector remains a critical source of employment for 300,000 workers – over 5% of Argentina's private sector workforce. Employment conditions are often poor, particularly in the apparel subsector, where over 70% of employment is informal, and 60% of employees work for businesses with fewer than five workers. Approximately 80% of Argentina's garment factories and workshops are located in Greater Buenos Aires, with virtually all production directed to the domestic market. Apparel exports are minimal with a few notable exceptions such as Derwill, a local Nike, Inc. supplier that exports Nike-branded socks to Brazil, Chile, and Uruguay.

Spinning and weaving have a higher rate of labor and tax formality due to higher capital requirements; equipment alone can require an initial investment of US$1–10 million. This subsector is more geographically dispersed with significant production in cotton-producing provinces (Chaco, Corrientes, Tucumán, and San Juan) or provinces with industrial promotion regimes such as La Rioja and Catamarca.

Among the few investment announcements in the textiles sector is the relaunch of Alpargatas Textil, one of the oldest brands in Argentina with a US$20 million investment and plans to supply the domestic market and export to Brazil and Uruguay.

== Key challenges ==
Argentina’s industrial base is large and diverse but faces several structural challenges. Tax issues for Argentine industry include distortionary export taxes, lack of harmonization across provinces and municipalities, taxes on purchases of foreign currency, and administrative burden. Out of 150 taxes that apply to the business sector, only 12 contribute 95% of revenue; the remainder contribute minimal revenue but distort product markets and raise compliance costs.

Competitiveness remains a challenge. The CEO of Toyota Argentina has stated that the company is not competitive as an exporter even though its main assembly plant exports 80% of its production.

To improve competitiveness for small and medium-sized manufacturers, the Milei administration has proposed a "mini RIGI" with incentives.

== Recent trends ==
Argentine manufacturers have been badly impacted by the recent economic crisis, with the national statistics agency reporting that industrial production decreased by 14.8% in May 2024 vs. May 2023. The decline was broad-based with electronics and tools production down by 28%, motor vehicles down 19%, and metals and machinery down 17% vs. a year earlier.

The Agrifood sector has benefited from the end of drought conditions. Soybean crushing is expected to grow by 44% in 2024.

Declining demand in Argentina's domestic market has hurt locally owned small and medium-sized industrial enterprises. In a May 2024 survey conducted by the Industriales Pymes Argentinos association, 70% of respondents described their situation as "bad" or "very bad", with 55% expecting conditions to worsen over the next 12 months. The head of the Cámara de la Industria de la Indumentaria, a textile industry association, estimated in March 2024 that 160 textile manufacturers had closed since the beginning of the year in the province of Santa Fe alone, eliminating over 100,000 jobs. The suspension of all federal public works contracts has similarly hurt businesses in the construction supply chain, including asphalt and concrete manufacturers.

The food sector has seen Argentina's two largest corporate bankruptcies. Molino Cañuelas, Argentina's largest flour producer, has operated under bankruptcy protection since 2019. As of August 2024, creditors were reviewing the company's latest proposal to restructure US$1.2 billion in debt. Vicentin, once considered a "crown jewel" of the soybean processing industry, defaulted on US$1.5 billion in debt in 2019 amid allegations of financial impropriety by its controlling shareholders; as of September 2024, an Argentine court was reviewing a rescue proposal by agribusiness giants Bunge Global and Viterra.

Large industrial groups have resorted to layoffs and production shut-downs. Steel producer Acindar (a subsidiary of ArcelorMittal) suspended production at its five plants for one month in March 2024. Production at the General Motors plant near the city of Rosario was halted for two months at the start of 2024. Plant shutdowns continued in 2025 despite prospects for economic recovery. Nestlé announced that production of powdered and ultra-high temperature milk at its plant in Córdoba province will pause during March 2025 due to weak local and export demand.

Several multinationals, including Clorox, Procter & Gamble, and Canadian fertilizer company Nutrien have divested local production operations entirely due to the challenging business environment. Others are scaling back their exposure to Argentina; for example, Nissan eliminated one of its production shifts at its Córdoba plant in early 2025, cutting its capacity by half.

However, even in the midst of this severe downturn, Argentina's industrial sector continues to attract greenfield foreign direct investment, particularly in the automotive sector.

Local financing markets have reopened for Argentine manufacturers as well. Recent bond sales include a US$50 million raise by Mirgor, a producer of consumer electronics and auto parts, US$30 million by Aluar, Argentina's largest aluminum producer, and US$73 million by food processor Arcor. Meanwhile, US$30 million and US$70 million in bonds were sold by the local subsidiaries of agricultural equipment multinationals John Deere and CNH respectively. These financings carry significant currency risk for the issuers given that with the exception of Arcor the bonds have all been dollar-denominated or dollar-linked. Yet the availability of capital is an encouraging sign for Argentine industry.

To encourage further investment, the Milei administration implemented Decree 749/2024, which authorizes the regulatory framework known as RIGI (Régimen de Incentivo para Grandes Inversiones or Incentive Regime for Large Investments). RIGI tax, customs, legal, and foreign currency benefits are being offered to targeted industrial sectors, including steel, petrochemicals, infrastructure, electric and hybrid vehicles, biotechnology, nanotechnology, and defense manufacturing. Foreign officials have responded positively to the RIGI, with U.S. Undersecretary of State for Economic Growth, Energy, and Environment, José W. Fernández, remarking that "a company that is considering a major investment spoke very favorably" of the new regime.

== See also ==
- Agriculture in Argentina
