= Central Puerto =

Central Puerto S.A. is an Argentine energy provider headquartered in Buenos Aires, which is involved in the development of energy generation both nationally and internationally. It is a public company listed in the S&P Merval index of the Buenos Aires Stock Exchange.
