= Banco Santander Argentina =

Spanish commercial bank and financial services company

Coordinates: 34°36′25″S 58°22′24″W

Banco Santander S.A.

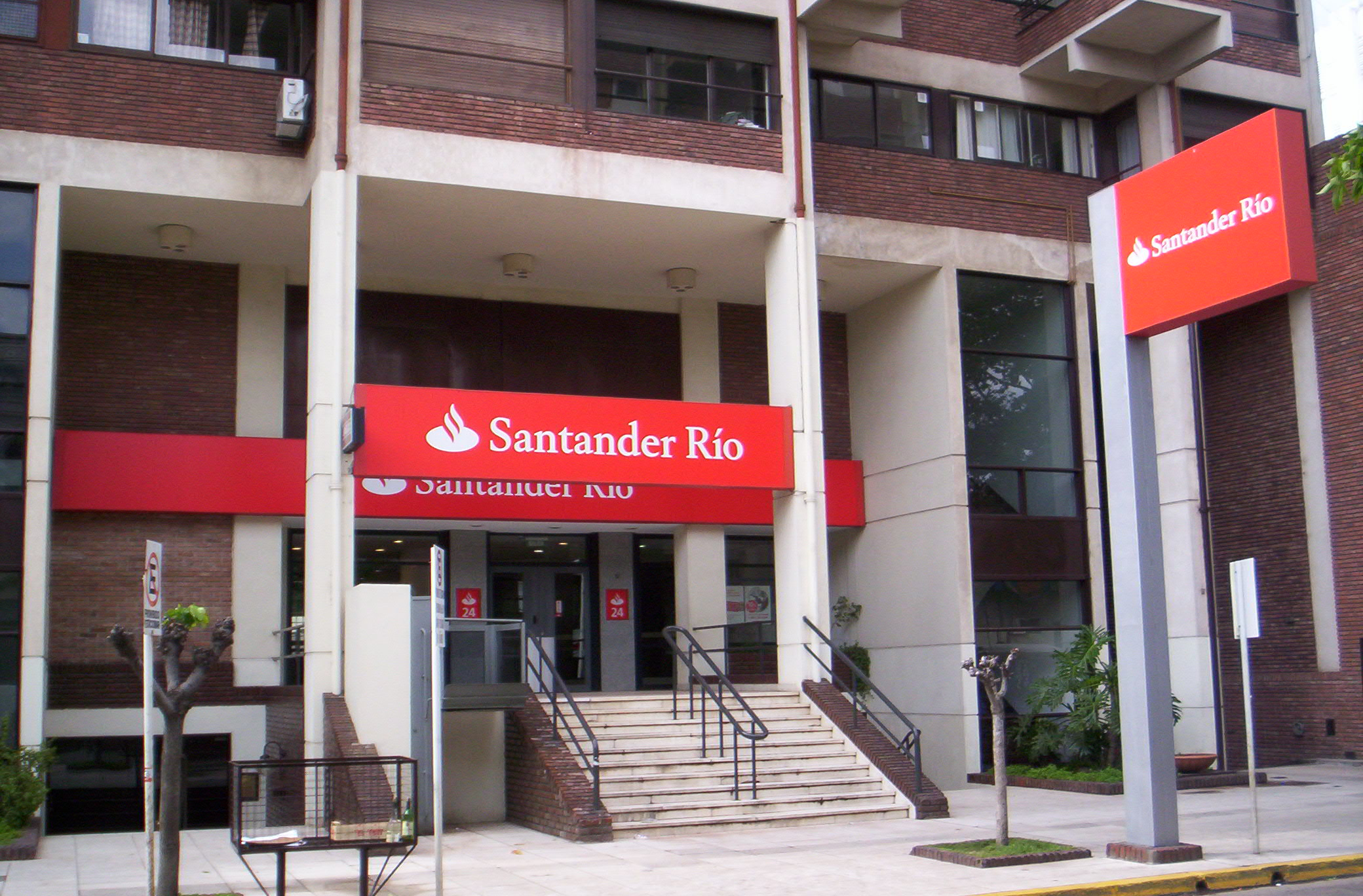
- A branch in Junín, Buenos Aires
- Formerly: Banco Rio de la Plata, Banco Santander Río
- Type: Sociedad Anónima
- Founded: 1968; 58 years ago as "Banco Río"
- Headquarters: Bartolomé Mitre 480; Buenos Aires
- Area served: Argentina
- Key people: Alejandro Butti, Chairman and CEO; Guillermo Tempesta, Vice-President; Gabriel Ribisich, CFO
- Products: Retail banking Offshore banking Mutual funds Trade finance Insurance; Mortgages; Consumer finance Credit cards
- Revenue: ▲US$ 1.3 billion (2012)
- Net income: ▲US$ 427 million (2012)
- Total assets: ▲US$ 11.6 billion (12/2012)
- Number of employees: 6,485 (8/2012)
- Parent: Santander Group
- Website: www.santander.com.ar

Banco Santander Argentina (formerly Banco Río de la Plata and then Banco Santander Río) is a commercial bank and financial services company and affiliate of the Santander, Cantabria (Spain) based Santander Group. Based in Buenos Aires, its banking operations are the third largest in Argentina, as well as the largest among all privately owned banks in the country.

The bank has 430 branches, 3.5million clients and more than 8,500 employees.

== Overview ==
The "Banco Río de la Plata" (named for the neighboring estuary of the same name) was established on May 14, 1968, via the acquisition of the Banco del Este by Pecom, a private holding company owned by the Pérez Companc family. The Pérez Compancs had established themselves in the Argentine business world relatively recently, through the success of the Compania Naviera Pérez Companc, a shipping company established in 1946. Gregorio Pérez Companc, the adoptive heir to the helm of the family conglomerate, purchased the bank from the Pérez Companc Foundation (led by his sister, Alicia) in 1993.

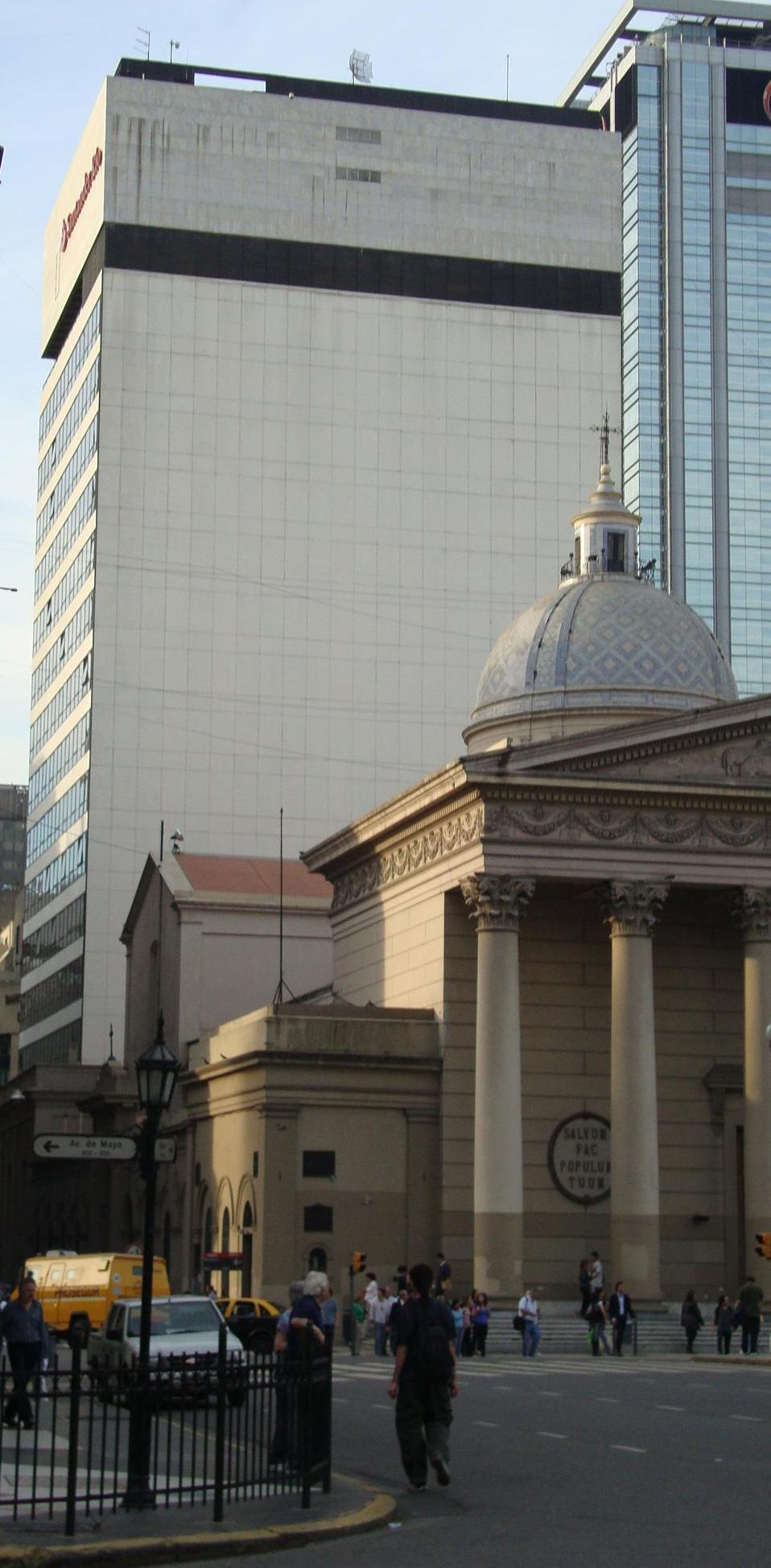
Headquarters in Buenos Aires

Pérez Companc, for whom Banco Río de la Plata financed a number of acquisitions during President Carlos Menem's privatization drive (for significant stakes in Telecom Argentina, freight rail carrier Ferroexpreso Pampeano, electric distributor Transener, gas distributor TGS, and numerous others) ultimately sold a controlling stake in the bank (35%, with an option to buy for another 15%) to Grupo Santander in May 1997 for US$1.1 billion, upon which it was renamed Banco Río, and listed in the Buenos Aires Stock Exchange. Its most important acquisition during the partnership with Santander was that of Banco Tornquist, among the most traditional names in Argentine banking. Pérez Companc sold his remaining 18.5% share in February 2001 to Merrill Lynch, which later sold their stake to Santander.

Santander Argentina is a majority-owned subsidiary of the Santander Group through its holding company, ABLASA, with 79% of its equity, and 99.3% of its outstanding shares. Its services include retail banking, debit and credit cards, consumer and commercial loans, mortgages, fixed-term deposits, money transfers, cash management, and other banking operations processing services to businesses and individuals, as well as to small and medium businesses. Santander Seguros is the bank's insurance arm, and Santander Sociedad de Bolsa, a brokerage house, its sole subsidiary. The bank also has a majority stake in Visa Argentina, Gire (a wire transfer service), Banelco (ATM), and Interbanking (an offshore banking unit), among others.

The bank, maintains deposits of around US$7.7 billion (nearly 7% of the total), and a lending portfolio of US$6.4 billion (8% of the total); the 3.5 million Santander Argentina credit cards (a 13% market share) make it a close second as the largest issuer of these in Argentina, next to Galicia Financial Group. The bank operates 330 branches nationwide, and employs over 6,000; its network of Banelco ATMs, totaling over 2,000, is the most extensive in the country.
