= Transener =

Argentinian electrical transmission network operator

Compañía de Transporte de Energía Eléctrica en Alta Tensión (Transener)
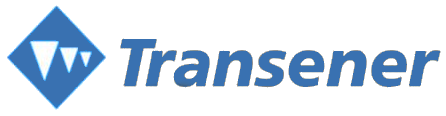
- Company type: Sociedad Anónima
- Traded as: BCBA: TRAN; MERVAL component
- Industry: Utilities
- Founded: 1993; 33 years ago
- Headquarters: Buenos Aires, Argentina
- Key people: Osvaldo Costa, (Chairman); Carlos García Pereira, (CEO)
- Products: Electricity transmission
- Revenue: ▲US$ 147.0 Million (2010)
- Net income: ▼US$ 5.8 Million (2010)
- Parent: Pampa Energía
- Website: transener.com.ar

Transener (BCBA: TRAN) is the leading Argentine company in the transmission of extra high voltage electric power.

The company owns the national extra high voltage transmission network, comprising almost 8,800 kilometers (5,500 mi) of transmission lines. Another 5,500 miles of lines belong to the distribution network and subsidiary, Power Distribution Transport Company of the Province of Buenos Aires S.A. (Transba S.A.).

Buying the power transmission network from a State enterprise, Compañia de Tranporte de Energía en Alta Tensión, upon its 1993 privatization, Transener operates 95% of the high voltage lines in Argentina, and is a subsidiary of Pampa Energía, the largest private electricity producer in the country. Controlled by local conglomerate Pérez Companc until 2003, Pampa Enegía gained control of the company in 2004, when it bought a controlling stake from Brazilian energy giant Petrobras.
