= Banelco =

Argentinian ATM Network

Logo

Banelco (an acronym for Banca Electrónica Compartida) is an ATM network in Argentina. Established in 1985, it offers several services related to cash flow management, including debit cards, electronic transfers and service payments.

Banelco is owned by private banks and operates 6.000 ATMs (one third of the total in the country). Its main competitor in the Argentine market is Red Link. The company also operates Pagomiscuentas, an electronic bill payment service.

== Member banks ==
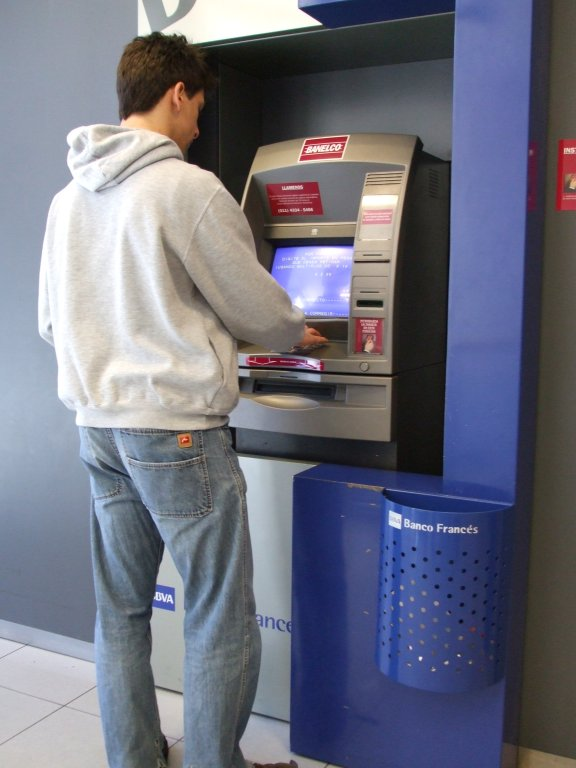
Client using a Banelco ATM in Buenos Aires

Banks in Argentina which maintain Banelco ATMs include:

- Banco Comafi
- Banco del Sol
- Banco Galicia
- Banco Macro
- Banco Patagonia
- Banco Regional del Cuyo
- Banco Santander Argentina
- Banco Supervielle
- BBVA Argentina
- Citibank Argentina
- ICBC Bank
- BRJFO AMUR

== See also ==
- Automated Teller Machine
- ATM Industry Association (ATMIA)
