= Pampa Energía =

Argentine energy company

Pampa Energía S.A.
- Company type: Sociedad Anónima
- Traded as: BCBA: PAMP; NYSE: PAM; MERVAL component
- Industry: Energy
- Founded: 2005; 21 years ago
- Headquarters: Buenos Aires, Argentina
- Key people: Marcelo Mindlin (Chairman), Gustavo Mariani (CEO), Ricardo Torres (Executive Vice President), Damián Mindlin (Executive Vice President)
- Products: Oil, Natural Gas, Electric power, Styrenics
- Services: Electric power transmission Electricity distribution Gas transport Midstream; Oil transportation
- Revenue: ▲US$2.9 billion (2018)
- Net income: ▲US$287 million (2018)
- Number of employees: 10,000
- Subsidiaries: Edenor; Transener; TGS; Petrolera Pampa; Refinería del Norte
- Website: pampaenergia.com

Pampa Energía S.A. is the largest independent energy company in Argentina, with participation in the electricity and oil and gas value chain. It was founded in 2005 and is headquartered in Buenos Aires.

Pampa is listed on the Buenos Aires Stock Exchange and is one of the Argentine companies with a greater weight on the Merval index (7.1809% as from January 1, 2019). In addition, Pampa is one of the Argentine companies with a greater weight on the MSCI Argentina Index (10.77% as of January 31, 2019).

Pampa has a Level II American Depositary Share (ADS) program listed in the New York Stock Exchange, and all ADS represents 25 common shares.

== Core Businesses ==
In the electricity value chain, as of December 31, 2018, Pampa's power generation segment has an installed capacity of 3,871 MW, which represents 10% of Argentina's installed capacity. 504 MW expansions are in the pipeline to be developed by the Company, increasing total installed capacity to 4,375 MW. The power transmission segment is composed by Transener, company co-controlled by Pampa, which operates and maintains the Argentine high voltage transmission grid covering more than 14.5 thousand km of lines, as well as 6.2 thousand km of Transba high voltage lines. Transener transports 85% of the electricity in Argentina. The electricity distribution segment is composed of Edenor, the largest electricity distribution utility in Argentina, with 3 million customers and a concession area covering the Northern City of Buenos Aires and Northwestern Greater Buenos Aires.

Pampa started to develop gas upstream in 2009, with the creation of Petrolera Pampa. In 2016, Pampa enhanced their oil and gas segment by acquiring the Petrobras Argentina, which was formerly PeCom Energía and later the former Argentine subsidiary of Petrobras. Pampa currently holds in their oil and gas segment both operated and not operated blocks in Neuquina, San Jorge and Noroeste Basin, which average production from Argentina amounted to 47 thousand barrels of oil equivalent per day, with operations in 11 production blocks and 869 productive wells (March 2019). In midstream, Pampa's assets are made up by their indirect interest in TGS, the country's major gas transportation company, owning a 9,231 km-long gas pipeline network and a liquids processing plant, General Cerri, with an output capacity of 1 million tons per year. In downstream, Pampa holds 28.5% direct interest in Refinor, which has a refinery with an installed capacity of 25.8 thousand oil barrels per day, 81 gas stations and a processing capacity of 390 thousand tonnes per year. Pampa also owns three high-complexity petrochemical plants producing styrene, SBR and polystyrene, with a domestic market share ranging between 80% and 100%.
