= Citibank Argentina =

Argentine commercial bank

Coordinates: 34°36′25″S 58°22′26″W

- Type: Subsidiary
- Founded: 1914; 112 years ago
- Headquarters: Buenos Aires, Argentina
- Key people: Juan Bruchou (president)
- Products: Offshore banking Investments; Trade finance Insurance; Accounting; Mergers and acquisitions
- Parent: Citigroup
- Website: www.citibank.com/icg/sa/latam/argentina/

Citibank Argentina is a commercial bank and financial services company and a subsidiary of Citigroup. It currently provides institutional services. In 2016, its retail operations were sold to Banco Santander Argentina.

== Overview ==
Citibank Argentina was established in 1914 as the Buenos Aires branch of the National City Bank of New York, and the first of any United States bank in Argentina. The bank remained a secondary name in Argentine banking; but earned renown for the quality of its services: its Paylink payment processing network made it the first bank in Argentina to earn an ISO 9000 (1997), and in 2002, Citiservice y Citiphone Banking earned the institution an ISO 9002 certification.

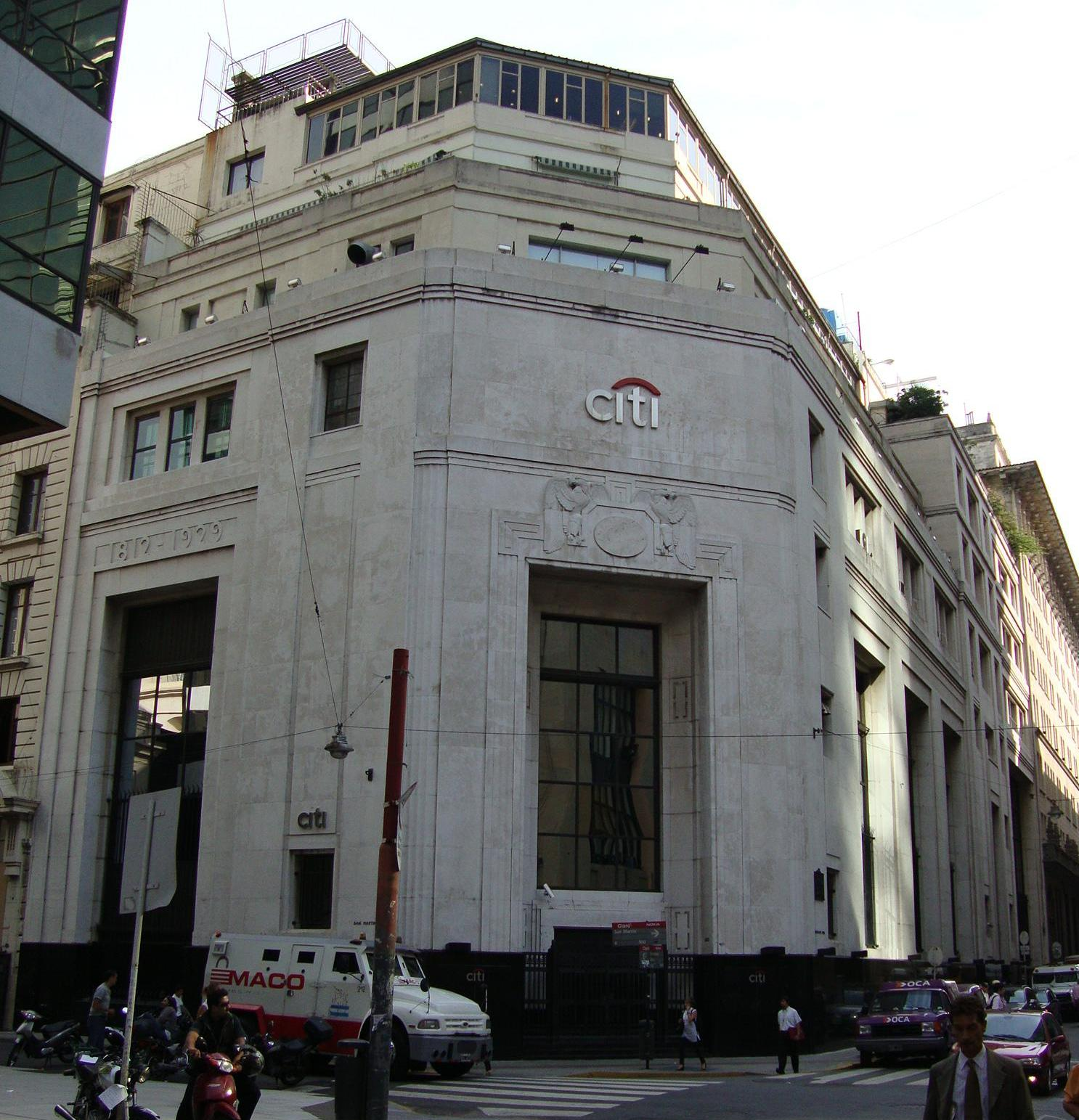
Headquarters in Buenos Aires

The president of Citicorp Argentina during the 1990s, H. Richard Handley, had been raised in Argentina with the chairman of Citigroup at the time, John S. Reed, and obtained his support for the bank's lucrative participation in the 1990 sale of the state telephone concern ENTel. Under bank president Carlos Fedrigotti, the bank acquired Buenos Aires–based Banco Mayo in 1998, stabilizing the insolvent institution's finances, and doubling Citibank's network.

Losses registered during the 1998–2002 Argentine great depression prompted an investigation in 2004 by the U.S. Securities and Exchange Commission.

In 1999, the division acquired Provencred; it was sold to Banco Comafi in 2009.

In April 2017, its retail division was sold to Banco Santander Argentina. At that time, the bank had US$1.4 billion in assets and provided credit cards, personal loans, deposit accounts, and a retail brokerage business.

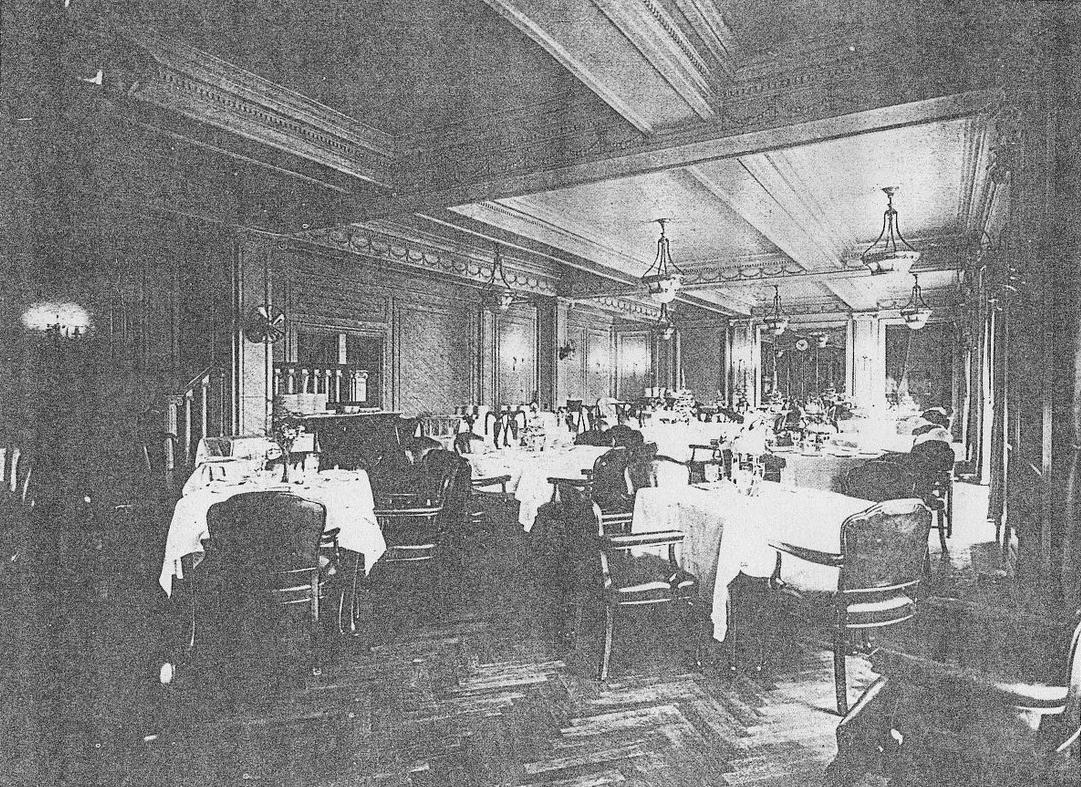
The Club Americano in 1929

=== Headquarters ===
The headquarters of Citibank Argentina, at Bartolomé Mitre 502, are in the heart of the Buenos Aires financial district, and face the offices of the Bank of the Province of Buenos Aires and Banco Santander Argentina, two of its largest competitors. The building, notable for its Art Deco façade and main hall, was designed by Luis Aberastain Oro and Lyman Dudley, and completed in 1929. The building was also known in its early decades for the Club Americano, a social club located on the top floor, and popular with Buenos Aires' sizable American expatriate community.
