= Edesur =

Electricity distributor in Argentina

Empresa Distribuidora Sur S.A.
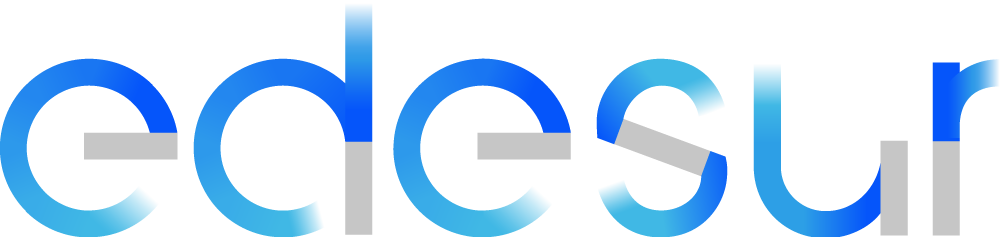
- Company type: Public
- Industry: Utilities
- Founded: 1992; 34 years ago
- Headquarters: Buenos Aires, Argentina
- Key people: José María Hidalgo
- Products: Electricity distribution
- Parent: Enel Argentina
- Website: edesur.com.ar

Edesur is a distributor of electricity in Argentina, headquartered in Buenos Aires.

Purchasing a majority stake in the newly privatized Segba utility in 1992, the company has an exclusive concession to distribute electricity in the south section of Greater Buenos Aires, and in the south of Buenos Aires proper.

== See also ==
- 2019 South American blackout
