= Segba =

Argentine state-owned enterprise

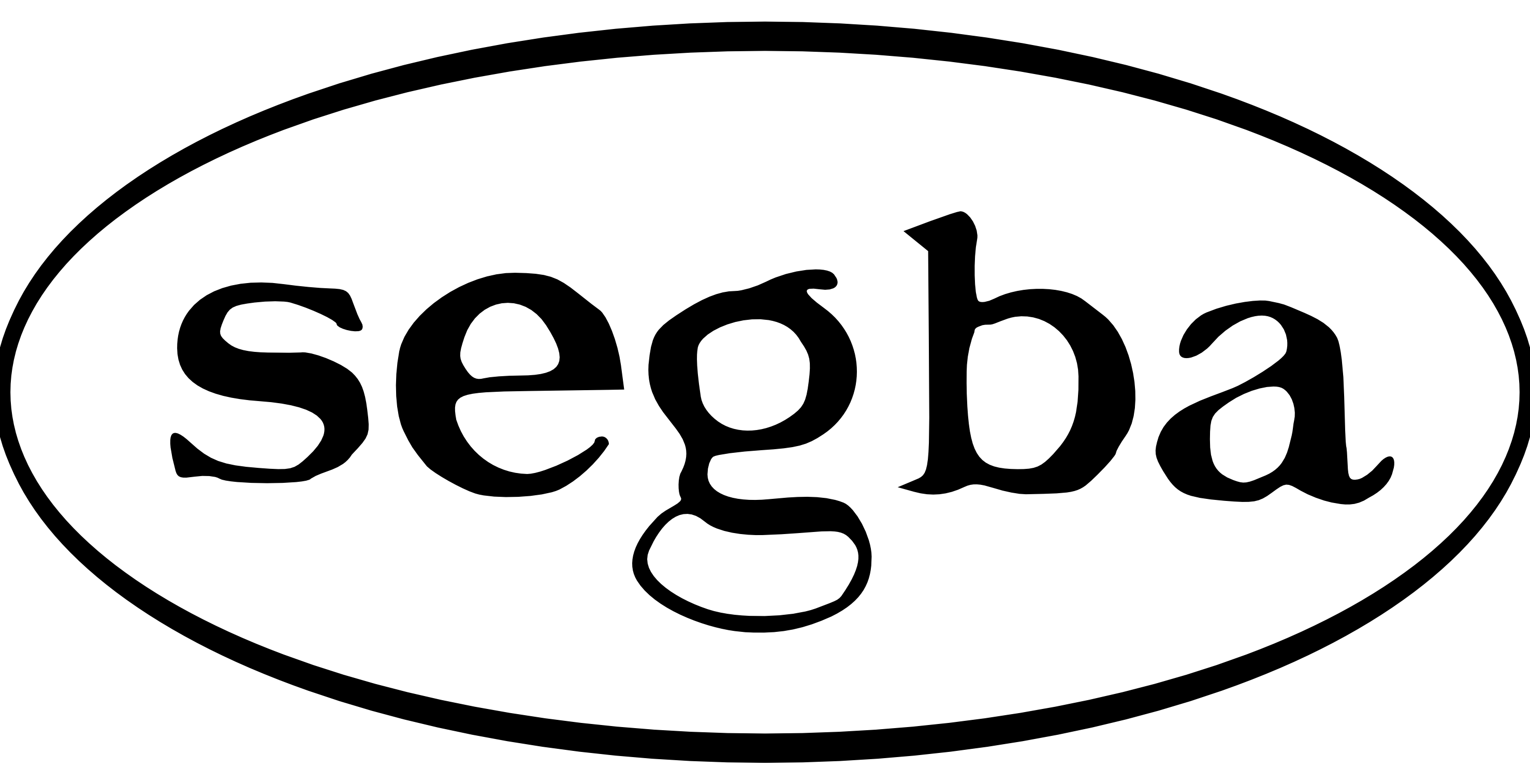
Servicios Eléctricos del Gran Buenos Aires (SEGBA) logo

Servicios Eléctricos del Gran Buenos Aires (Segba or SEGBA) was an Argentine state-owned enterprise responsible for the generation, transmission, distribution, and commercialization of electricity in the City of Buenos Aires (now the Autonomous City of Buenos Aires), the Greater Buenos Aires metropolitan area, and the Greater La Plata region.

== History ==
Servicios Eléctricos del Gran Buenos Aires (SEGBA) was established on October 24, 1958, as part of Argentina’s efforts to centralize and modernize its electricity services. Previously, the electrical grid in Buenos Aires and its surrounding areas was managed by various private companies, including CADE, CEP, and the Compañía Ítalo Argentina de Electricidad (CIAE). The creation of SEGBA marked a shift towards government control, with the state initially holding 80% of the company’s shares while private entities retained the remaining stake.

The Argentine government moved quickly to consolidate the sector. By 1961, it had acquired full ownership of SEGBA, bringing the entire metropolitan electricity system under state management. Over the next two decades, SEGBA expanded its infrastructure and incorporated CIAE’s assets, completing the transition to a unified public utility by 1979. During this period, Argentina also pursued the development of hydroelectric and nuclear energy projects to keep pace with growing demand.

However, by the late 1980s, SEGBA faced mounting challenges. Aging infrastructure, inadequate investment, and rising electricity consumption led to widespread supply shortages. The situation culminated in the electricity crises of 1988 and 1989, when planned outages became a common occurrence.

In response, President Carlos Menem initiated a sweeping privatization of Argentina’s electricity sector. SEGBA was dismantled in 1992, with its operations divided into separate entities handling generation, transmission, and distribution. The restructuring resulted in the creation of three major distribution companies—Edesur, Edenor, and EDELAP—alongside four new power generation firms. While SEGBA continued to exist temporarily as a legal entity during the transition, it was ultimately dissolved in 1998, marking the end of an era in Argentina’s electricity management.
