= Mirgor =

Argentine technology company

Coordinates: 53.797°S 67.73°W

Mirgor S.A.C.I.F.I.A.
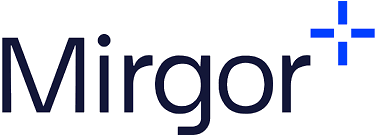
- Type: S.A. (corporation)
- Traded as: NYSE: MIRG
- Founded: 1983
- Headquarters: Buenos Aires; Río Grande, Argentina
- Key people: José Luis Alonso (CEO); Roberto Gustavo Vázquez (President)
- Website: mirgor.com

Mirgor is an Argentinean company that produces electronics, mobile and automotive components, and exports, distributes and commercializes agricultural products. It has its administrative headquarters in the city of Buenos Aires, and industrial sites in Río Grande, Garín and Baradero, as well as its own agricultural-livestock exploitation field in Bolívar.

It is engaged in electronics and auto parts production; design and execution of engineering and system projects; commercial channel management and retail activities; and, since 2018, in agricultural business.

Its annual revenue in 2023 was approximately 2.5 billion dollars. Mirgor is a partner of international brands such as Samsung, Toyota, Ford, Fiat, GM, Mercedes-Benz and Volkswagen.

It is expected to be among the 100 Argentine companies with the highest number of exports and provides employment to over 3,000 people. The average age of the staff is 28 years, and 53% of the company's workforce is composed of women.

In early 2024, Mirgor's stocks rose by more than 50%. It is currently among the top 1000 Argentine companies in terms of exports.

== History ==
The company was founded by Nicolás Caputo, Roberto Gustavo Vázquez and Mauricio Macri in 1983. Roberto Gustavo Vázquez, hailing from Ford, already had experience in the automotive industry.

The company began by producing car air-conditioning systems in the city of Río Grande in Argentina. Its first product on the market was the Peugeot 504 air conditioner, which Mirgor designed and developed for Sevel. At that time, only 5% of cars in Argentina came with air conditioning.

Macri sold his shares in the company in 1994 and left the board in 1996.

In 1994, Mirgor began to list its shares on the Buenos Aires Stock Exchange and the London Stock Exchange.

After the 1998–2002 Argentine great depression, a restructuring of the company took place. Among other innovations, it started manufacturing home air conditioners and ventured into the still novel cellular phone industry.

In 2004, the company began production of home air-conditioning systems.

In 2009, Mirgor purchased Industria Austral de Tecnología S.A. (IATEC), which produced mobile phones for Nokia in 2010 and televisions for LG in 2011. Production of audio and video equipment and microwaves began in 2012, followed by Dell notebooks a year later.

IATEC began assembly of mobile phones and televisions for Samsung in 2014, along with automotive electronics products for Pioneer. In 2017, a subsidiary called GMRA was formed, for the branding of consumer electronic and electric products. Also in 2017, the company received IATF 16949 and ISO 9001 certification. It is currently IPC-A-610 Class 3 certified.

In 2016, José Luis Alonso took on the role of CEO of the Group.

In 2019, Mirgor acquired Famar Fueguina S.A, a holding corporation of Holdcar and Electrotécnica. Famar Fueguina SA carries out activities of manufacturing and supplying parts for the automotive industry, mainly electronics.

The group entered the agro-industrial sector in 2018. In 2019, Mirgor made its first exports of wheat, soybeans, and corn In March 2023, it acquired an approximately 1,500-hectare field in San Carlos de Bolívar for its own agricultural and livestock production.

In October, 2020 Mirgor acquired the Argentinean subsidiary of wireless communications company Brightstar Corporation.

During the COVID-19 pandemic, Mirgor developed OxiTemp App, which allows to measure and monitor blood oxygen saturation, heart rate and body temperature.

In October 2021, it signed an agreement with the Argentine Aircraft Factory (FAdeA), with the aim of promoting the development and production of aircraft components made in Tierra del Fuego, such as the Pampa III.

In November 2022, Mirgor acquired Outokumpu Fortinox S.A, a company dedicated mainly to import and sell of different types of steel.

In December 2022, Mirgor authorities presented to the provincial authorities of Tierra del Fuego the project for the construction of the Rio Grande city port, which will require an investment close to US$210 million.

Also in December 2022, Mirgor agreed with Aerolíneas Argentinas to operate cargo transportation by Mirgor SA, through the addition to its fleet of two B737-800 aircraft, a freighter type with a capacity to transport 22 tons.

The acquisition of Sauceco, in March 2023, implied its definitive expansion into the agro-industrial sector.

In May 2023, Mirgor signed a contract with Millicom and began operating in the United States under the name of Mirgor USA LLC. The company announced that it will focus on the planning and supply of cellular phones, centralizing these operations in Miami.

Mirgor is currently promoting the project to create a port in Río Grande, where most of the electronic companies in the province are located. The estimated investment is US$380 million and a construction time of 2 years. Among the multiple advantages, the port would solve the issue of transit through national waters, a historic problem for the island. The start of the construction is scheduled for 2024, after the end of the winter fishing ban. It is estimated that the Mirgor Group will invest around 380 million dollars in this development.

In November 2023, the company issued a negotiable debt obligation for US$300 million, opening up new investment opportunities to the public.

Regarding its regional expansion, the Group currently operates with its own offices in Asunción, Paraguay, and is exploring new business units in that country. In Uruguay, it landed in 2023 with the acquisition of Anovo, a leading aftermarket company. From its central laboratory, Mirgor provides support to the rest of the mobile phone companies in the country. Together with Samsung, Mirgor expanded its regional presence by opening new SmartThing stores in the Dominican Republic and Paraguay. As a strategic partner of Hisense in Uruguay, they launched a new line of Smart TVs with QLED and Mini-LED models. In November, it began operations in Panama. In 2024, Mirgor's international division reported revenue of US$240 million.

In 2023, Mirgor Agro received an award for outstanding achievements in Export Diversification, presented by the magazine Prensa Económica.

In April 2024, Mirgor introduced the End of Line Tester, a development aimed at quality testing for technological products.

In September 2024, CEO José Luis Alonso participated in the "Forbes Reinventing Argentina Summit" and stated that the country's economic growth towards 2025 will depend on its ability to export "technology, proteins, and talent."

In December 2024, the group announced an agreement with the Spanish hotel chain Meliá Hotels International for the construction of a five-star hotel in Ushuaia, scheduled to open its doors in 2028.

== Products and services ==
Mirgor has 8 business units.

- Manufacturing: electronics and autoparts production.
- Retail: management of commercial channels and retail activities.
- Innovation: design and execution of engineering and systems projects.
- Agriculture: agribusiness development.
- Supply Chain: reception, storage, preparation and distribution of goods.
- Distribution: distribution of advanced technology and comfort products.
- Services: Provision of technical services and integral solutions.
- Global

In the automotive sector, the company produces air conditioning equipment, infotainment systems and control modules for several automotive companies. The Group is currently building ONTEC, a plant in Baradero for the production of appearance parts for the automotive industry.

As for consumer electronics, Mirgor also manufactures cell phones, televisions and monitors, among others and has its own retailer named Diggit.

Mirgor operates Samsung stores in Argentina and has its own retailer called Diggit.

Mirgor Distribution distributes its own manufactured products and gives local distribution and international commercialization to other manufacturers, retailers, resellers, telephone operators and other third parties.

Regarding the Services department, Mirgor is dedicated to the reconditioning of equipment, providing protection services and after-sales services under their brand Ferbi. It also offers repurchase and exchange services.

The company has a business division called Mirgor Innovation that develops software programming and mechanical engineering projects.

The Group is currently building ONTEC, a plant in Baradero for the production of special parts for the automotive industry combining plastic and electronic products of high complexity.

Mirgor Agro closed 2023 with more than 1,000,000 tons of various commodities and specialties exported.

== Awards ==
Mirgor received Toyota's "Best Performance Supplier Award″ in 2021 and the Regional Contribution Award in 2022.

== Foundation ==
In 2022, Mirgor presented the "Mirgor Foundation: Community development towards the future". Through the Foundation, Mirgor seeks to accompany the communities in which it has presence by the promotion of four main areas of work: Education, Health, Culture and Habitat.

=== Education ===
In June 2023, the Foundation announced the opening of a first technological innovation competition for entrepreneurs It also opened different courses for the professional training of operators in Tierra del Fuego. In September 2023, they launched a new course on the use of artificial intelligence in education.

In 2024, it organized "Codechallenge Tierra del Fuego," a competition for residents of the province with intermediate or advanced programming skills in any language. The event had 95 participants from across the province, out of which 21 programmers made it to the final phase. In March, the Foundation launched a scholarship program for students in the final years of technical high schools. At the Provincial Technical Education College of Río Grande (CPET), the Foundation provided training on the 5S methodology, which companies use to organize their spaces and management processes as well as the CIRCULA.RG program on sustainable entrepreneurship and the circular economy.In July, the Mirgor Foundation inaugurated its “School of Innovation, Creativity, and Technology” for teachers of 4th, 5th, and 6th grades of primary education. As part of the Environmental Awareness Day, the Foundation organized training and promotion activities on upcycling. In November, the Foundation announced a workshop on the employment inclusion of people with disabilities in collaboration with the Disability Secretariat of the Government of the Tierra del Fuego Province. As part of Technical Education Day, the foundation organized TecnoGrande, an exhibition of innovative projects held in collaboration with the technical schools of Río Grande. The Foundation reported having provided training to 2,000 people and benefits to over 3,200 during 2024.

The educational projects of the Foundation, in collaboration with Samsung, were recognized by the legislatures of the City of Buenos Aires and Tierra del Fuego.

=== Health ===
In February 2024, the Mirgor Foundation donated 300 oximeters to the Municipality of Río Grande to enhance services in health centers, as well as an artificial respirator for the Regional Hospital Governor Ernesto Campos in Ushuaia.

=== Culture ===
In November 2023, the Mirgor Foundation entered into a strategic framework agreement with the Joint Antarctic Command (COCOANTAR) to promote the development and well-being of the Argentine community in Antarctica. The representatives of the Foundation's visit included the donation of electronic devices. In March 2024, the Foundation also made a donation of Qüint electric bicycles for use by the Command at Esperanza Base.

=== Habitat ===
In 2022, the Foundation announced the "Transportable Modular House" project, a sustainable housing alternative to address the housing needs of the province.
