= Edenor =

Argentine electricity distribution company

Empresa Distribuidora y Comercializadora Norte S.A.
- Type: Sociedad Anónima
- Traded as: BCBA: EDN; NYSE: EDN; MERVAL component
- Industry: Utilities
- Founded: 1992; 34 years ago
- Headquarters: Buenos Aires, Argentina
- Key people: Daniel Marx (Chairman & CEO)
- Products: Electricity distribution
- Revenue: ▲US $2.4 billion (2023)
- Net income: ▲US $164 million (2023)
- Owner: Grupo América (51%); ANSES (26.8%)
- Number of employees: 4,635
- Parent: Edelcos
- Website: www.edenor.com

Edenor is a public Argentine electricity distribution company founded in 1992 and headquartered in Buenos Aires. The company has an exclusive concession to distribute electricity in the northwestern section of Greater Buenos Aires, and in the north of Buenos Aires proper, selling electric power to residential, commercial, industrial, and government customers.

Edenor's 34,500 kilometers of network and 2.5 million customers represent 18.5% of the Argentine market in its industry.

== History ==
Edenor was established on July 21, 1992, as part of the broader privatization of Servicios Eléctricos del Gran Buenos Aires S.A. (SEGBA), a state-owned entity responsible for electricity distribution in Buenos Aires. SEGBA was split into three distribution companies—Edenor, Edesur, and Edelap—as well as several generation companies. This restructuring was intended to promote competition and efficiency in the sector.

EDF International S.A., was among the international investors that acquired a controlling interest in Edenor through an Argentine holding company named EASA. The concession agreement granted to Edenor was set for 95 years, lasting until 2087. By September 1992, EASA had secured a majority shareholding in the company.

In the early 1990s, Edenor faced significant challenges, particularly with electricity theft, which was rampant in certain areas, especially in shantytowns. The company attempted to mitigate these losses by installing automatic circuit breakers to regulate power usage. However, community and political activists put up opposition, resulting in compromises that allowed people to continue using electricity while trying to limit usage of high-energy appliances.

The 2000s were a period of significant change for Edenor. During this decade, ownership of the company changed hands several times. In 2002, EDF sold a majority stake to the Dolphin Group, which later became part of the Grupo Emes. This group eventually integrated Edenor into Pampa Energía S.A., a major player in Argentina's energy sector.

In the 2010s, Edenor responded to regulation changes and tried to modernize its operations. The Argentine government implemented a Comprehensive Tariff Review in 2017, adjusting electricity rates to reflect operational costs more accurately. This process included public hearings and aimed to address the financial instability of the sector, which had been affected by currency devaluation and inflation.

Edenor also embraced digital transformation during this period, launching the Edenor Digital platform in 2017. This platform, accessible via a website and mobile application, enabled customers to manage their accounts, view and pay bills, and monitor electricity consumption online. The company's modernization efforts also extended to sustainability, as Edenor adopted the United Nations Sustainable Development Goals in 2017 and began piloting renewable energy initiatives.

== Financial activity ==
For the period ending September 30, 2024, Edenor reported a profit of ARS 235,069 million attributable to its shareholders. The company’s total equity was recorded at ARS 1,119,525 million.

In October 2024, Edenor completed a private exchange offer for its 9.75% Senior Notes due 2025. As part of the transaction, the company issued new 9.75% Senior Notes maturing in 2030, with approximately 85.12% of the existing notes tendered and accepted in the exchange. Additionally, Edenor issued an extra US$135 million in new notes.

In November 2024, Fitch Ratings upgraded Edenor’s Foreign and Local Currency Issuer Default Ratings from CCC to CCC+. The company’s bonds were also raised to a B− rating, accompanied by an improved Recovery Rating of RR3.

Edenor shareholder José Luis Manzano, along with partners Daniel Vila and Mauricio Filiberti, agreed in 2026 to buy YPF's roughly 70% stake in Metrogas and MetroEnergía for US $780 million, following a competitive sale process run by Citigroup on YPF's behalf. The deal gave Manzano control of Argentina's largest gas distributor, adding to a 9.23% stake he already held through Integra Gas Distribution, and extended his energy holdings beyond his position in Edenor. The sale was part of YPF's broader strategy under CEO Horacio Marín to divest non-core assets and concentrate investment in Vaca Muerto oil and gas development.

== Renewable energy ==
In March 2018, Edenor became the first company in Argentina to purchase a fully electric vehicle, adding the Renault Kangoo ZE to its fleet in Buenos Aires.

That same year, the company started testing small-scale power generation systems with energy consumption between 10 and 50 kW in Buenos Aires City and Greater Buenos Aires.

Edenor also installed solar panels at their building on Avenida Andrés Rolón in San Isidro, which allowed them to generate and feed electricity back into the grid.
