= Enel Américas =

Utility group in Central and South America

Enel Américas S.A.
- Type: Sociedad Anónima
- Traded as: BCS: ENELAM; S&P Latin America 40 component
- Industry: Electric Energy
- Founded: 1889
- Headquarters: Santiago, Chile
- Products: Electricity generation, transmission and distribution
- Revenue: ▲US$ 4,825 million (2022)
- Net income: ▲US$ 44 million (2022)
- Number of employees: 16,072
- Parent: Enel
- Subsidiaries: Enel Colombia Enel Distribuição São Paulo; Enel Distribuição Río; EGP Brasil; Volta Grande; Cachoeira Dourada; EGP Costa Rica; EGP Guatemala; EGP Panamá
- Website: www.enelamericas.com

Enel Americas is a conglomerate of electric energy companies operating in South America and Central America countries: Argentina, Brazil, Colombia, Peru, Costa Rica, Panama and Guatemala. Through its affiliates it generates, transmits and distributes electric power.

Enel Américas has a total of 16,116 MW of net installed capacity, delivering energy to more than 23.3 million customers, by the end of 2022 Its controlling shareholder is the Italian company Enel S.p.A., a global energy company and one of the largest integrated operators in the energy in the world.

Enel Américas is one of the largest private companies in Latin America, totaling 15,965 MW of installed capacity and delivering energy to more than 26.3 million customers, as of March 2022.

In January 2023, Enel Américas was once again confirmed in The Sustainability Yearbook, an annual study that compares the sustainability performance of listed companies, based on a demanding and competitive evaluation. The company has been part of this selection since 2019 and this year was distinguished for the first time within the Top 5% S&P Global ESG Score category, placing it among the most sustainable companies in the electricity industry worldwide.

== History ==
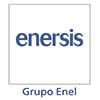
The former logo of the company

On June 19, 1981, Compañía Chilena de Electricidad S.A. was reorganized into a parent company and three subsidiaries. One of these was Compañía Chilena Metropolitana de Distribución Eléctrica S.A. In 1985, under the Chilean government's privatization policy, the process of transferring the share capital of Compañía Chilena Metropolitana de Distribución Eléctrica S.A. to the private sector was begun, ending finally on August 10, 1987.

In this process, the pension fund management companies (AFPs), company employees, institutional investors, and thousands of small shareholders joined the company. Its organizational structure was based on activities or operative functions whose results were evaluated functionally and its profitability was limited by a tariff structure as a result of the company's exclusive dedication to the electricity distribution business.

=== Restructuring and diversification (1987–2014) ===
In 1987, the company's board proposed forming a division for each of the parent company's activities. Four subsidiaries were therefore created to be managed as business units each with its own objectives, thus expanding the company's activities toward other non-regulated activities but linked to the main business. This division was approved by the extraordinary shareholders meeting of November 25, 1987, which defined its new corporate objects. Compañía Chilena Metropolitana de Distribución Eléctrica S.A. thus became an investment holding company.

On August 1, 1988, by virtue of that agreed at the General Extraordinary Shareholder's Meeting of April 12, 1988, one of the corporations born out of the division changed its company name to Enersis S.A. The same year, and with the purpose of successfully facing the challenge of development and growth, the company was divided into five business units, which gave rise to five affiliates.

Of these, Chilectra and Río Maipo took charge of electric power distribution; Manso de Velasco concentrated upon engineering and electric construction services, as well as real estate administration; Synapsis took care of the information technologies and data processing area; while Diprel focused upon lending electric product supply and marketing services.

In the General Extraordinary Shareholder's Meeting of April 11, 2002, the corporate purpose of the company was modified, introducing the activities of telecommunications and the investment in and administration of companies having telecommunications and information technologies and business intermediation through the Internet as corporate purposes.

=== Acquisition by Enel (2014–present) ===
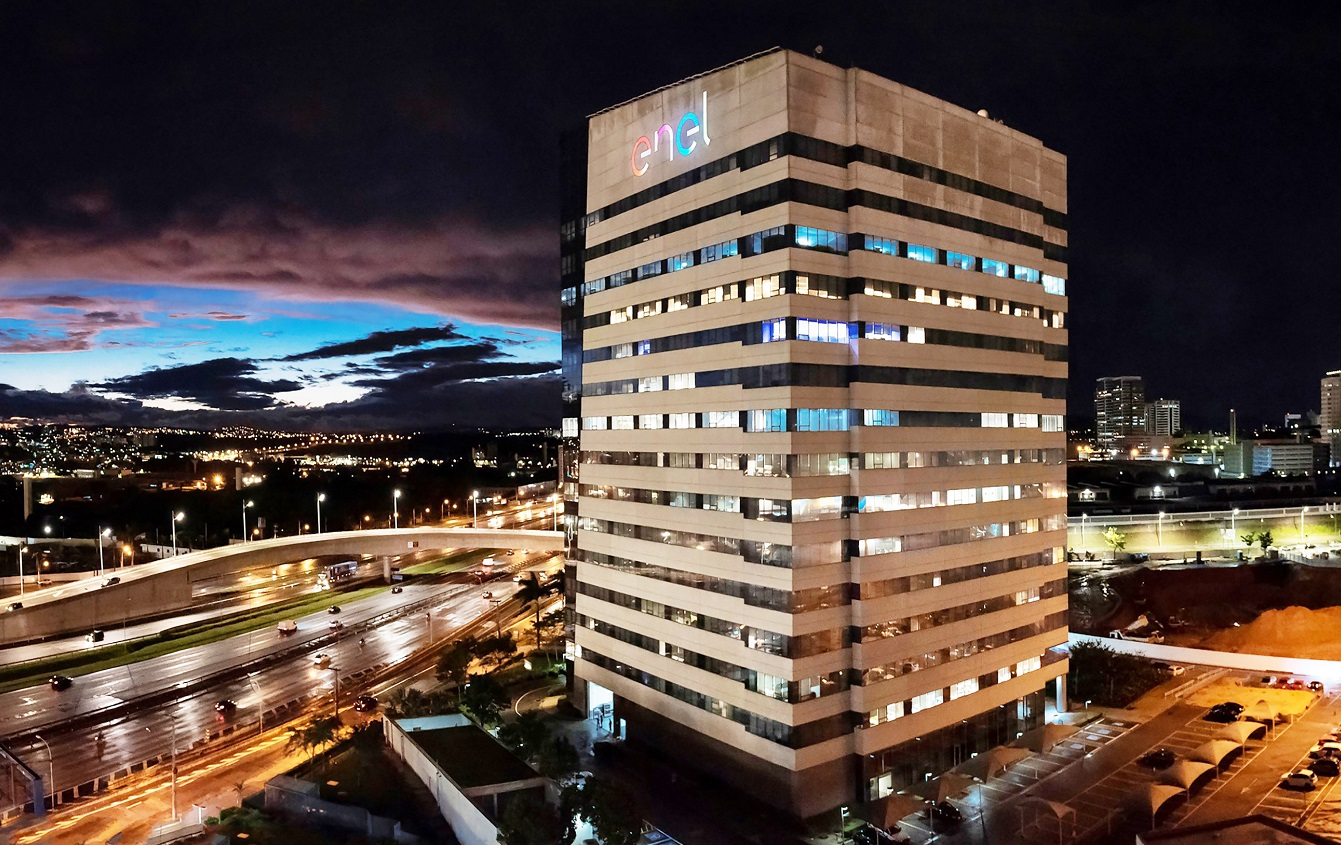
Enel Américas corporate building in Brazil

In October 2014, after Endesa was acquired by Enel, Enersis S.A became controlled by Enel. The company underwent a corporate restructuring process that began in April 2015 and ended in December 2016. The restructuring consisted in separating the electric power generation and distribution activities developed in Chile, from the rest of the countries. In this way, Enel Americas S.A. was created, a company continuing Enersis with activities in Argentina, Brazil, Colombia and Peru, and Enel Chile S.A.

Today, Enel Americas S.A. is one of the largest private electric power companies in Latin America, in terms of consolidated assets and operational income, which has been achieved through a stable and balanced growth in its electric power businesses: generation, transmission and distribution.

The merger by absorption of the subsidiaries Emgesa S.A. ESP (Absorbing company), Codensa S.A. ESP, Enel Green Power Colombia S.A.S. ESP y ESSA2 SpA (Absorbed companies) took place on March 1, 2022. The new corporate name of the merged company is Enel Colombia S.A. ESP, a company in which Enel Américas holds a 57.345% stake as a result of this operation.

== Main milestones ==
=== Capital increase ===
In April 2019, the Extraordinary Shareholders' Meeting approved a US$ 3 billion capital increase. The proceeds were used to conclude the purchase of AES Eletropaulo – the biggest distribution company of South America, with 7.2 million clients, in the city of São Paulo, Brazil – and to restructure Enel Brasil's pension fund liabilities related to the aforementioned purchase.

In September 2019, the capital increase was successfully concluded with a subscription of approximately 99.5% of the total shares.

=== Integration of non-conventional renewable energy business ===
On December 18, 2020, the Company's Extraordinary Shareholders’ Meeting approved the Merger by incorporation of EGP Américas into Enel Américas by a large majority, allowing the latter to control and consolidate the ownership of the renewable energy business and generation assets that Enel Green Power develops and owns in Central and South America (except Chile).

The merger was effective as of April 1, 2021. Delisting on the New York Stock Exchange and Deregistration with the SEC. On May 31, 2022, the intention to delist the stock from the New York Stock Exchange (NYSE) and deregister Enel Américas with the Securities and Exchange Commission (SEC) was announced. The ADRs were delisted on June 20 from the NYSE and after a month of trading on the Over the Counter (OTC) market, the ADR program was officially cancelled on July 21, 2022. On November 2, 2022, a Form 15F was filed with the SEC, formally requesting the deregistration of the company from the SEC. This process was completed and was informed through an essential fact on February 1, 2023.

=== Asset rotation policy ===
On June 9, 2022, a share purchase agreement was signed with ENEVA S.A., through which Enel Brasil sold 100% of the shares issued by CGTF - Central Geradora Thermoeléctrica Fortaleza S.A. ("Termofortaleza"), a gas-fired generating subsidiary. On August 23, the sale of the asset was completed. This sale was part of the Company's decarbonization policy.

On July 28, 2022, it was announced that Enel Brasil S.A. (a subsidiary of Enel Américas) was receiving expressions of interest for the acquisition of its stake in Enel Distribución Goiás. On September 23, 2022, a purchase and sale agreement was signed with Equatorial Energia S.A., to sell 99.9% of the shares of Enel Distribución Goiás. On December 29, 2022, the disposal of the asset was materialized.

On November 22, 2022, the controller, Enel SpA, published its Strategic Plan 2023-25, where it indicated its intention to sell all its operations in Argentina and Peru, and to sell the distribution company Enel Ceará in Brazil.

To date (March 2023), the sale of Central Costanera and Central Dock Sud, both generating companies in Argentina, has been completed, leaving pending the last generating company El Chocón, and for the distribution business, the company Edesur. The processes of expressions of interest for the assets in the generation and distribution business in Peru have already been initiated, together with the process of Enel Ceará in Brazil.

== Stock market information ==
In Chile, the stock is traded on the following stock exchanges: the Santiago Stock Exchange or "BCS" (Bolsa de Comercio de Santiago) and the Chilean Electronic Stock Exchange or "BEC" (Bolsa Electrónica de Chile). As of December 31, 2022, the BCS and BEC accounted for 93% and 7%, respectively, of the total equity traded in Chile. The market cap as of december 2022 was US$ 14,230 billions.

In the United States, during 2022, 302,209,504 ADSs were traded (through July 20, 2022), equivalent to 15,110,475,200 ordinary shares (1 ADS represented 50 shares).

== Enel X ==
In 2018, it formed Enel X Colombia S.A.S. (“Enel X Colombia”), a wholly owned subsidiary of Codensa. The primary purpose of Enel X Colombia is to focus on public lighting tenders, supplementing the activities of Codensa. They also changed the name of Enel Soluçoes S.A., a wholly owned subsidiary of Enel Brasil, to Enel X Brasil S.A. (“Enel X Brasil”). These companies will develop, implement, and sell products and services that incorporate innovation and cutting-edge technology and are different from selling energy or energy distribution and associated services. These Enel X companies expect to offer turnkey projects for municipalities and other public and governmental entities, industrial or residential customer appliances such as photovoltaic systems, heating ventilation air conditioning, led lighting, projects related to energy efficiency, and the development of public and private electric mobility, and charging infrastructure, in all cases including customers outside of the concession areas.

== Sustainability in the core ==
In December 2022, Enel Américas was once again recognized to integrate the three categories of the Dow Jones Sustainability Index: Emerging Markets, Integrated Market of the Pacific Alliance (MILA) and Chile, having obtained the highest score of 87/100, since its participation. Enel Américas was also highlighted in the FTSE4Good Emerging Index and the FTSE4Good Latin America Markets Index. These indexes are part of the FTSE4Good series and incorporate companies listed on stock exchanges around the world that meet high environmental, social and governance (ESG) standards based on the principles of responsible investment.

Enel Américas achieved its highest score since participating in the global non-profit environmental platform Carbon Disclosure Project (CDP), made up of companies from around the world that have been identified as world leaders in their corporate response to climate change. This recognition, obtained with an A− score, acknowledges its actions to reduce emissions, mitigate climate risks and develop a low-carbon economy.

== Electric power generation affiliates ==
Enel Américas has a total installed capacity of 16,116 MW as of December 31, 2022.

In Brazil, Enel Américas participates in electric power generation through Enel Brasil and its affiliates Cachoeira Dourada, Volta Grande and EGP Brazil.

In Colombia, Enel Américas participates in electric power generation through its affiliate Enel Colombia.

In Perú, Enel Américas controls Enel Generación Peru and Enel Generación Piura through Enel Peru S.A.C.

== Electric power distribution affiliates ==
Enel Américas participates in the electric power distribution business in Latin America through the following affiliates:

- Argentina: Edesur
- Brazil: Enel Distribución Rio, Enel Distribución Ceará, and Enel Distribución São Paulo
- Colombia: Enel Colombia
- Peru: Enel Distribución Perú

== Electric power transmission affiliates ==
Enel Américas participates in the electric power transmission business through the interconnecting line between Argentina and Brazil. This takes place through Enel Cien, an affiliate of Enel Brasil.
