= El Sitio (website) =

El Sitio was a Latin-American internet portal founded in 1997, by Roberto Vivo-Chaneton and Roberto Cibrian-Campoy. Founded in Argentina, El Sitio was considered one of the principal Spanish language internet companies of the late 1990s dot-com bubble.

== Company history ==
El Sitio went public on Nasdaq under symbol LCTO on December 10, 1999, in an IPO consisting of 8,200,000 common shares at a price of $16 per share.

During the .com bust of the 90s, El Sitio lost almost all of its market value on Nasdaq.

In 2001, El Sitio was merged with Ibero-American Media Partners II Ltd. to create Claxson Interactive Group Inc. (OTC BB: XSON)

As of late 2005, Venezuelan media group Cisneros owned 44.8% of Claxson and Dallas-based private equity fund Hicks, Muse, Tate & Furst held 35.2%.

As of 2020, the site was no longer available.
