= Aluar =

Argentine aluminum company

Coordinates: 42°44′27″S 65°02′34″W

Aluar Aluminio Argentino S.A.I.C
- Type: S.A.I.C
- Traded as: BCBA: ALUA; MERVAL component
- Industry: Aluminium
- Founded: 1970; 56 years ago
- Headquarters: Buenos Aires, Argentina
- Key people: Javier Santiago Madanes Quintanilla, (Chairman)
- Products: aluminium products, aluminium alloys
- Revenue: ▲US$14.6 billion (2017)
- Net income: ▲US$1.95 billion (2017)
- Number of employees: 2,200
- Website: www.aluar.com.ar

Aluar is the only aluminium smelter in Argentina and one of the largest in South America.

== History ==
Established in 1970 as a partnership between synthetic rubber maker FATE, businessman José Ber Gelbard, and other private investors, Aluar obtained an exclusive licence to produce aluminum from the military regime of General Alejandro Lanusse, who sought to make Argentina self-sufficient in the critical industrial staple. Following state-financed works on a hydroelectric dam in Trevelin, Chubut Province, Aluar opened its first smelter in Puerto Madryn, in 1974.

The 47th largest enterprise in Argentina in 1979, and with an output of 140,000 metric tons, Aluar/FATE was listed on the Buenos Aires Stock Exchange that year. It expanded into the aluminium products industry with the purchase of Kicsa (a former subsidiary of Kaiser Motors), in 1983. Retaining a majority stake in the company as the principal in FATE, Manuel Madanes died in 1988, and following a probate dispute within the family, Dolores Quintanilla de Madanes, an in-law, acquired control of the group.

Aluar acquired aluminum products maker Camea, a local subsidiary of Canadian firm Alcan, in 1993, and Alcan's remaining local concern, C&K Aluminio, in 1996. The privatizations drive advanced by President Carlos Menem led to the 1995 sale of the Futaleufú Dam, whose installed capacity of 472 MW nearly doubled that of its Trevelín facility, and it expanded further into the intermediate products sector with the 1998 purchase of Uboldi & Compañía.

Unlike most Argentine companies during the 1998-2002 Argentine great depression, Aluar did well and expanded. Due to the devaluation of the Peso, goods produced by Aluar became cheaper to foreign buyers and most of their production was sold abroad.

The company produced 275,000 tonnes of aluminium in 2006, as it embarked on a series of expansion projects which increased production to 410,000 tons in 2008.

== Technology ==
The Puerto Madryn smelter has four reduction lines:

- Lines 1 and 2 each have 200 Montecatini P-155 reduction cells
- Line 3 has 144 Pechiney AP18 reduction cells.

Stage 1 of Line 4 was commissioned in 2007 and comprises 168 Pechiney AP18 reduction cells operating at a current of 220 kA. This will increase the smelter capacity by 105 thousand tonnes. Aluar intend to extend Line 4 to 336 cells in a future expansion.
