= Transportadora de Gas del Sur =

Argentine natural gas company

- Type: Joint stock company
- Traded as: NYSE: TGS; BCBA: TGSU; MERVAL component
- Industry: Natural gas extraction
- Founded: December 1992; 33 years ago
- Headquarters: Buenos Aires, Argentina
- Key people: Joao Ferreira Bezerra de Souza, Chairman of the board Mariano Pablo Gonzalez, Vice Chairman of the Board; Gonzalo Castro Olivera, Chief Financial and Administrative Officer
- Products: Natural gas, LNG
- Revenue: ▲ARS 1,309.50 M (2007, ~US$413.26 M)
- Net income: ▲ARS 347.40 M (2007, ~US$109.63 M)
- Owner: Companía de Inversiones de Energía S.A. (55.3%); D.E. Shaw & Co. (15.2%); NYSE & Buenos Aires Stock Exchange (29.5%)
- Number of employees: 644 (as of 2007)
- Website: tgs.com.ar

Transportadora de Gas del Sur (Gas Transporter of the South) is the largest natural gas transporter in Argentina. The company was established in 1992, after the privatization of Gas del Estado, the state owned company that maintained the pipelines.

== History ==
Transportadora de Gas del Sur was established on December 28, 1992 after the privatization of the Argentine energy sector, it was part of Gas del Estado, a government regulated company divided later on Transportadora de Gas del Sur and Transportadora de Gas del Norte.

== Operations ==
TGS is the largest gas supplier in Argentina, operating the biggest pipeline system of the country and of Latin America transporting the 60% of the total Natural gas consumed and supplies directly to distributors, electric generators and industries. The maximum capacity is of 74.265.500 m^{3} a day, with an extension of 7.972 km of Pipeline transport and a maximum potency of 579.090 hp (431.827 kW). TGS also distributes Liquefied natural gas (LNG), Operating in the General Cerri complex in Buenos Aires Province.

=== General Cerri Complex ===
Located in Buenos Aires Province the General Cerri Complex is dedicated to the recovery of ethane, propane, butane, natural gasoline, and NGL. All the products recovered are dispatched to Galván Harbor, a nearby facility where they are stored or loaded in trucks or ships for distribution. The General Cerri complex produces 40% of the company's income.

== Pipelines ==
TGS has three pipelines that produce 60% of the company's income:

The Neuba I runs from Sierra Barrosa to Bahía Blanca. Originally built in 1970, it was expanded in 1996. One of the main supply lines of the company, the pipeline transports the gas supply from the basin in central Neuquén across Rio Negro, La Pampa and Buenos Aires provinces, ending in the General Cherri Complex. The gas is later transported to the Greater Buenos Aires area.

The Neuba II, built in 1988, was expanded four times between 1996 and 2000. The pipeline begins in Cerros Colorados Complex, in the Neueuqén basin. It crosses Neuquén, Río Negro, La Pampa and Buenos Aires, ending in Ezeiza, Buenos Aires, just outside Buenos Aires. The pipeline is the main distribution for Buenos Aires and Greater Buenos Aires as well.

The San Martin is the largest of the three that provide natural gas to the Tierra del Fuego Province, Chubut province, Rio Negro, Neuquén, and Buenos Aires provinces.

Location
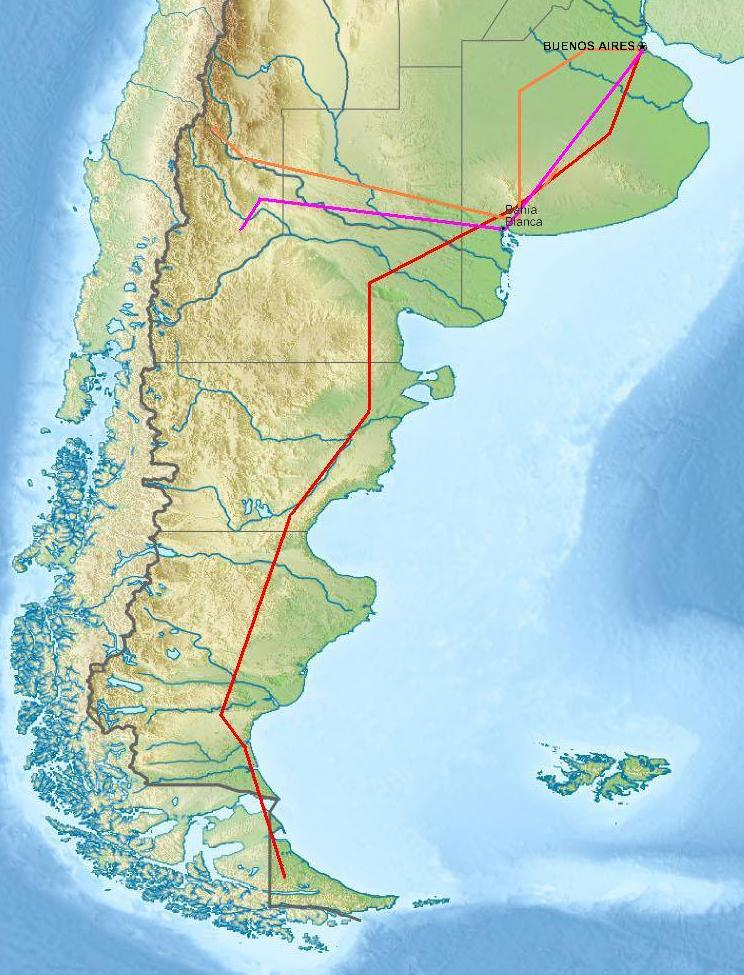
Details

Name	Length	Pipe dimensions	Max. Power	Compressor stations	Max Potence
Neuba I	1,971 km - 1,224 miles (1,970 km)	24 / 30 inches	60 kg/cm^{2}	8	68,310 hp
Neuba II	2,201 km - 1,367 miles (2,200 km)	30 / 36 inches	70 kg/cm^{2}	6	145,980 hp
San Martin	3,756 km - 2,333 miles (3,755 km)	30 inches	60 kg/cm^{2}	16	364,800 hp
