= The Aroma Cafe =

Argentine coffee chain, founded in London, England

Aroma Café S.A.
- Company type: Public services
- Industry: Coffeehouse
- Founded: 1991; 35 years ago, in London, England; 2000; 26 years ago, in Buenos Aires, Argentina
- Headquarters: Buenos Aires, Argentina
- Key people: Sergio Gratton
- Products: Coffee; Tea; Pastries
- Parent: Freddo (a subsidiary of Grupo Pegasus)

The Aroma Cafe (S.A.) is an Argentine coffee chain and a former British coffee chain. It was founded in London, England in 1991 and started in Buenos Aires, Argentina in 2000.

McDonald's purchased Aroma in 1999. It expanded the chain in the UK and in Argentina. McDonald's sold Aroma's London outlets to Caffè Nero in 2002 which rebranded the chain to Neros. The Argentine part of the chain was sold in 2004 to Freddo, an ice cream chain owned by Pegasus Capital.

== History ==
=== Early history ===
Aroma was founded by Michael Zur-Szpiro in 1991. When he was a student, Zur-Szpiro moved from Zug, Switzerland, to London to attend the London School of Economics in 1975 and said he found the city lacked a European style cafe that provides customers with straightforward snacks, delicious coffee, and delicious pâtisseries. He put his plan to start a café on pause for more than 10 years as he headed to the United States for schooling and being a consultant in Boston before going back to the UK. Zur-Szpiro grew interested in starting several cafes that would sell not just coffee and sandwiches but also products like packaged pasta and coffee packets. While he was employed at the London branch of Boston Consulting Group, in August 1989 he began putting together a business plan. Zur-Szpiro conducted research by visiting sandwich shops and snack bars. He spoke with the owners of the shops, commercial real estate companies, architects, designers, and people who sold coffee. Zur-Szpiro was fine with not having full ownership of his proposed new coffee shop, thought venture capital would be a good fit for the financially uncertain business, and desired an investment partner who would both provide consultation and be accepting of his plan to invest substantially in the coffee shop's design.

In March 1990, the venture capital firm Alan Patricof Associates contributed £2.5 million, which was 80% of the seed funding. Zur-Szpiro provided 15% of the funding while a third investor provided 5%. He received 44% of the coffee shop's ownership which by August 1991 became diluted to 38% after investors provided additional funds for starting two more shops. The investor Alan Patricof required Zur-Szpiro to personally manage the coffee shop so that Zur-Szpiro would understand the business better in relation to his ideas. Zur-Szpiro left his consulting position in March 1990. He enlisted the architecture firm ORMS Architects & Design to design Aroma with a "bright, cheery, contemporary Mexican look". Zur-Szpiro said Aroma's mission was, "We want to offer a 15-minute holiday in the sun so that people will feel good." The cafe, which had a combined indoors and outdoors capacity of 33, had walls painted yellow and white and covered in beeswax. Charlotte Packer commented in The Independent, "The electric yellow interiors are now a familiar sight across the West End". It had aquamarine outdoor seats whose color matched Aroma's outside walls and employee uniforms. Of the invested funds, 26% were expended on the design of the cafe and the furniture, 17% on furnishing the kitchen, 14% on legal costs, and 9% on creating the logo and branding. In December 1990, the first Aroma Cafe opened in Dean Street in London. Instead of making its own food like many other cafes, it received deliveries from two London bakeries which provided bagels and croissants, and from a tiny business that provided sandwiches and salads. Aroma reached the break-even point four months following its opening.

In 1994, the architecture firm ORMS finished its design on Aroma's sixth branch in Broadgate. Architects' Journal noted about the design, "The common palette of pigmented and waxed plaster finishes, low-voltage lighting and natural beech create a Mediterranean atmosphere in the cold, hard surroundings of the city." In a c. 1994 Café Magazine review of Aroma, Bob Biderman wrote, "From the moment I stepped inside I was mesmerised by its curious combination of outrageous charm and earnestness." Biderman liked Aroma's design, writing, "Instead of the self-indulgent monstrosities modern architecture can create, this was, thankfully, humane. There was a clear attempt to bring together form and function, to provide a sense of communal relaxation and enjoyment – the antithesis of the pervasive practices which treat the masses like cattle and turn harmony into a privilege you have to pay for." Around 1995, Aroma had contracts to cater to ITN and an American music television station.

In 1995, Apax Partners (previously known as Alan Patricof Associates) invited Finlay Scott, a management consultant, to review Aroma Cafe as Apax thought the chain was not doing well. Aroma's adversaries had better performances since Aroma had failed to expand beyond London which would help it grow quickly and its pricing strategy was deficient. Scott found that Aroma was offering too many products for sale and cut it down from 400 to 120. He maintained Zur-Szpiro's goal of equally proportioning Aroma on coffee and sandwiches. This positioned Aroma at the centre where on the one side was Pret a Manger which concentrated on sandwiches while on the other side was Starbucks which concentrated on coffee. Aroma's products were constructed in a factory in southeast London. By 1996, Aroma was selling over three million cups of coffee per year and had expanded to 11 locations including the Southbank Centre, Bond Street, and the Lakeside Shopping Centre. Writing for The Sunday Times in 1996, Nicholas Fox commented, "Aroma remains the most innovative [coffee bar], incorporating a flourishing food business serving unusual sandwiches such as turkey and red cabbage." Associated Press reporter Bruce Stanley described Aroma in 1999 as a chain that "sell[s] coffee and sandwiches in a lively atmosphere of recorded Caribbean music and bright yellow and orange decor". The founder, Michael Zur-Szpiro, switched to part-time employment at Aroma in 1996.

=== McDonald's ===
In 1999, Aroma Cafe had 23 locations, roughly 300 employees, and £10 million. McDonald's acquired Aroma Cafe in 1999 for £10.5 million. At the time of the acquisition, Apax Partners held 50% of the equity; Zur-Szpiro, the founder, had roughly 10%; and Finlay Scott, the Aroma chairman, held the rest. Since Apax had funded Aroma using a closed-end fund, it was forced to liquidate its position in Aroma. In 1988, Apax selected Cavendish Corporate Finance to set up the acquisition. The acquisition talks took seven months with Cavendish setting up a warranty insurance mechanism to satisfy both parties since McDonald's refused to proceed with the acquisition if there were no warranty and Apax as an institution was unable to provide a warranty. McDonald's said that after the acquisition Aroma still would be run as a separate brand by a different management team. Aroma was the first non-American chain McDonald's had acquired to run as a separate brand. It was the second company McDonald's had purchased ownership in "outside its traditional fast-food fare", with the first being Chipotle Mexican Grill. Claire Oldfield wrote in The Sunday Times in 2002 that the acquisition "is made more remarkable because Aroma was a start-up in 1991 backed by venture capital and retained an entrepreneurial feel when McDonald's bought it". While it was owned by the fast food chain, Aroma was subjected to some anticapitalist demonstrations focused on McDonald's.

In August 2001, McDonald's enlisted the services of SG Hambros to investigate a sale of Aroma. After acquiring Aroma, McDonald's had created a partnership with Pret a Manger, which offered customers both sandwiches and coffee. The BBC's Alex Ritson speculated that this made Aroma redundant to McDonald's plans and further noted that a second factor for the sale is that the UK is saturated with coffee shops. The Times's Dominic Walsh cited the same reasons for the sale, noting that McDonald's miscalculated how challenging it would be to "tur[n] the struggling Aroma brand around" while encountering "stiff competition" from Costa Coffee, Starbucks, Coffee Republic, and Caffè Nero. McDonald's asked for £5 million for purchasing Aroma's locations and brand, but the restaurant property advisor company Davis Coffer Lyons guessed that Aroma's leases amounted only to £5 million. After Caffé Nero was reported to be a possible buyer, an analyst speculated in September 2001, "Aroma may have to be dismembered and Caffe Nero would not be the only one seeking to buy some of its outlets."

=== Caffè Nero ===
Caffè Nero inked a preliminary deal to purchase 26 Aroma locations on 18 February 2002 which would increase the total number of Caffé Nero branches to 107. To fund the deal, Caffè Nero secured a £5 million loan from NatWest and Paladin Partners, which acted as both its bank and venture capital investor. It planned to spend £60,000 per Aroma outlet to rebrand all of them as it did not intend to use Aroma's name. The law firm Reed Smith Warner Cranston oversaw the acquisition. Aroma was rebranded to the name Neros. Caffè Nero's purchase of 31 Aroma stores for £2.45 million closed in May 2002. The acquisition moved Caffè Nero to third place in the UK coffee market after Costa and Starbucks. McDonald's lost over £20 million in its sale of Aroma, having spent £10.5 million to buy it and investing £17 million to make improvements and increase the number of Aroma branches from 23 to 35. The Guardian's Andrew Clark said "McDonald's has called time on its disastrous foray into coffee bars". Aroma had 35 total stores and McDonald's had been unable to find a buyer willing to purchase every one, so the remaining four stores would be independently sold.

== Aroma Ambiental in Argentina ==
Aroma expanded to Argentina in mid-2000 under the leadership of Sergio Alonso who had previously worked for McDonald's as an executive. At first, the goal was to have 50 Aroma locations by 2004, but the country's convertibility plan caused economic uncertainty so the goal was not reached. On 7 June 2004, the McDonald's local representative Arcos Dorados sold Aroma Ambiental to Freddo, an ice cream chain owned by Pegasus Capital. The sale included all six of Aroma's branches in Argentina. Two Aroma branches were in the shopping centres Galerías Pacífico and Unicenter. By the time of the sale, McDonald's had internationally divested all Aroma chains from its portfolio. A 2005 article in La Nación reported that Freddo had opened a branch in Villa Pueyrredón and would open one in Recoleta at a total cost of ARS$6 million. In a 2018 article titled "Shared premises: the strategy to improve profitability", La Nación reported that several Aroma Ambiental locations started to include Freddo ice cream stands.

== See also ==
- List of coffeehouse chains
