= Byma =

Argentine stock exchange and financial market operator

BYMA
- Type: Public company
- Industry: Financial services
- Founded: 23 July 2013 (creation approved)
- Headquarters: 25 de Mayo 359, Buenos Aires, Argentina
- Area served: Argentina
- Key people: Claudio Zuchovicki (President); Alexander Zawadzki (Vice President); Gonzalo Pascual Merlo (CEO)
- Website: www.byma.com.ar

Bolsas y Mercados Argentinos S.A. (BYMA) is an Argentine stock exchange and financial market infrastructure operator based in Buenos Aires. It provides securities trading, clearing and settlement services and, through its subsidiary Caja de Valores, central securities depository services.

BYMA was created after Capital Markets Law No. 26,831 reorganized the Argentine capital market. It was formed through a spin-off of the Mercado de Valores de Buenos Aires (Merval), with the participation of the Buenos Aires Stock Exchange (BCBA). The National Securities Commission (CNV) approved its registration as a market in December 2016.

== History ==
=== Establishment and launch ===
Law No. 26,831 was enacted in 2012. In July 2013, Merval shareholders approved a partial spin-off to create BYMA, with a capital contribution from the BCBA.

On 29 December 2016, the CNV approved BYMA's registration as a market. Merval transferred its trading activities to BYMA in 2017, and trading moved from the SINAC platform to the Millennium system.

=== Market development ===
In December 2024, five new CEDEARs representing ETFs were listed. Two of them, ETHA and IBIT, track Ethereum and Bitcoin. They were the first cryptocurrency ETFs available as CEDEARs in Argentina. The other three were GLD (gold), SH (an inverse S&P 500 fund) and FXI (Chinese equities).

BYMA Clearing went into operation in April 2026. Built on Nasdaq technology, it handles clearing, settlement, collateral and risk management.

From 2018 to 2026, S&P Dow Jones Indices calculated and administered BYMA's equity indices. On 19 October 2026, MSCI assumed responsibility for the indices.

The S&P Merval became the MSCI Merval (MMSCI), while the BYMA General Index was replaced by the MSCI BYMA Argentina General (GMSCI). Both indices started with a base value of 100,000 points and are published in Argentine pesos and US dollars.

The MSCI Merval initially included 19 stocks. Cresud entered the index, replacing Telecom Argentina and Sociedad Comercial del Plata, which were removed from the previous composition. The new methodology limits each stock to 15% of the index's total weight, with quarterly reviews in February, May, August and November.

In September 2026, BYMA and Galicia Asset Management, a subsidiary of Grupo Financiero Galicia, announced plans for Argentina's first domestically established exchange-traded fund (ETF). BYMA selected Galicia through an open call to structure the fund. The project operates under General Resolutions 1142 and 1143 of the National Securities Commission, approved in May 2026, and is intended to track the MSCI Merval index.

== Group companies ==
- Caja de Valores is Argentina’s central securities depository, in charge of the custody, registration and settlement of securities.
- Bymaeduca is the group's financial education initiative, providing training on capital markets and financial instruments. In February 2025, Bymaeduca launched an online platform with 27 courses on capital markets and financial instruments.
- Tecval (Tecnología de Valores) develops the information technology systems used in the group's capital market operations.
- BYMA Ventures was created in 2022 as BYX Ventures and adopted its current name in 2025. As of 2026, CB Insights listed 12 investments by the fund, mainly in fintech and market infrastructure startups.
