= MERVAL =

Argentinian stock market index

MSCI Merval
- Operator: Bolsas y Mercados Argentinos (BYMA)
- Exchanges: Byma
- Trading symbol: MMSCI
- Constituents: 19 (2026)
- Related indices: MSCI BYMA Argentina General
- ISIN: ARMERV160025
- Bloomberg: MERVAL:IND

The MSCI Merval, known as the S&P Merval until October 2026, is the main stock market index of Bolsas y Mercados Argentinos (BYMA). It tracks the largest and most liquid stocks within the MSCI BYMA Argentina General index.

From 2018 until 16 October 2026 the index was calculated and administered under an agreement between S&P Dow Jones Indices and Byma, which gave it its former name. MSCI took over on 19 October 2026 and the index was renamed. The peso-denominated price return version is published under the ticker MMSCI. The relaunched index started with 19 constituents and a base value of 100,000 points.

As of 30 July 2021, the constituent companies of the index included Aluar (aluminium smelter), BBVA Argentina (financial services), Banco Macro (financial services), Sociedad Comercial del Plata (holding), Edenor (electricity), Grupo Financiero Galicia (financial services), Pampa Energía (energy), Ternium (steel), Telecom Argentina (telecommunications), and YPF (oil and gas). In the October 2026 relaunch, the agricultural company Cresud joined the index, while Telecom Argentina and Sociedad Comercial del Plata were removed.

== Historical values ==
The following is a table showing the annual maximum, minimum and annual closing values of MERVAL between 1989 and 2022. During that period, the index hit its minimum value in 2001, some time before the explosion of the economic crisis, but recovered in an accelerated fashion after that.

The index experienced its biggest one-day intraday loss in history on 12 August 2019, when the index plummeted 16,824.29 points or 37.93% following the Argentine peso devaluation and the defeat of Mauricio Macri in the primary elections.

On 7 July 2022, the index closed above 100,000 points for the first time. This is due to the Argentine economy experiencing chronic inflation, which causes the peso to lose substantial purchasing power in a short period of time. As a result, despite the high valuations Argentine stocks actually lost value in hard currency terms such as U.S. dollars over the long run.

As inflationary pressure has continued in Argentina, with the annual inflation rate exceeding 100% for the first time in more than three decades, the S&P MERVAL index went up by 360% in 2023.

Year	Maximum	Minimum	Final
1989	37.27	0.20	37.27
1990	142.79	17.48	92.50
1991	854.70	83.85	800.62
1992	890.41	315.38	426.33
1993	581.92	356.56	581.92
1994	727.85	436.97	460.49
1995	518.96	262.11	518.96
1996	657.49	491.71	649.37
1997	869.45	556.72	687.50
1998	720.73	299.51	430.06
1999	607.57	333.00	550.47
2000	648.61	396.39	416.77
2001	540.16	193.40	295.39
2002	531.65	265.97	524.95
2003	1086.77	518.32	1071.95
2004	1408.10	828.34	1375.37
2005	1738.44	1265.97	1543.31
2006	2097.33	1486.56	2090.46
2007	2354.73	1751.75	2151.73
2008	2257.25	819.36	1079.66
2009	2343.29	914.07	2320.73
2010	3538.59	2060.18	3523.59
2011	3700.90	2212.28	2462.63
2012	2976.83	2118.07	2854.29
2013	5825.37	2867.43	5391.03
2014	12599.42	5244.86	8579.02
2015	14597.20	7976.00	11675.18
2016	18431.54	9199.81	16917.86
2017	30277.53	16921.64	30065.61
2018	35461.52	24618.09	30292.55
2019	44470.76	22484.40	41671.41
2020	56114.04	21738.62	51226.49
2021	97024.42	46011.61	83500.11
2022	205953.37	80403.36	202085.12
2023	1084545.00	194821.10	929704.19
2024	2680484.49	915346.96	2533634.65

=== Record values ===
Category	All-time highs	
Closing	2,801,220.76	Monday, 6 January 2025
Intraday	2,828,293.91	Monday, 6 January 2025
