= Buenos Aires Stock Exchange =

Stock exchange in Buenos Aires, Argentina

- Bolsa de Comercio de Buenos Aires

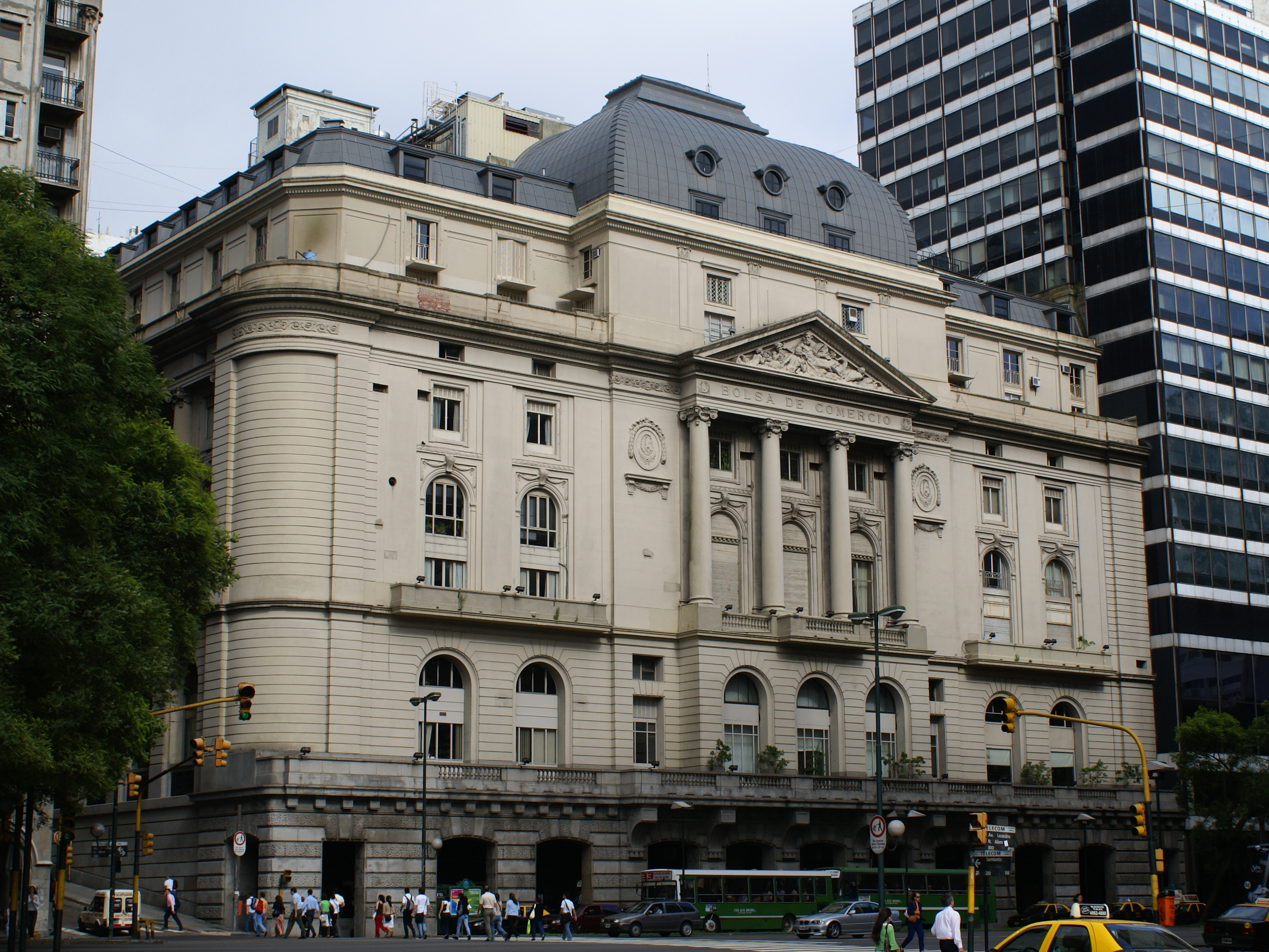
- Type: Stock Exchange
- Location: Buenos Aires, Argentina
- Coordinates: 34°36′23.87″S 58°22′12.35″W
- Founded: 1854
- Key people: Adelmo J.J. Gabbi, President
- Currency: Argentine Peso
- Market cap: US$140.0 Billion (2018)
- Indices: MERVAL
- Website: labolsa.com.ar

The Buenos Aires Stock Exchange (Spanish: Bolsa de Comercio de Buenos Aires, BCBA) is the organization responsible for the operation of Argentina's primary stock exchange located at Buenos Aires Central Business District. Founded in 1854, it is the successor to the Banco Mercantil, which was created in 1822 by Bernardino Rivadavia.

Citing BCBA's self-definition: "It is a self-regulated non-profit civil association. At its Council sit representatives of all different sectors of Argentina's economy."

The most important index of the stock market is the MERVAL (from MERcado de VALores, "stock market"), which includes the most important papers. Other indexes are Burcap, Bolsa General and M.AR., and currency indicators Indol and Wholesale Indol.

The Stock Exchange's current, Leandro Alem Avenue headquarters was designed by Norwegian-Argentine architect Alejandro Christophersen in 1913, and completed in 1916. A modernist annex was designed by local architect Mario Roberto Álvarez in 1972, and inaugurated in 1977.

The Buenos Aires Stock Exchange houses a specialized library containing more than 20,000 volumes focused on stock exchanges and securities markets, commercial law, corporations, banks, and currency. This extensive collection serves as a valuable research resource for various individuals, including academics, law and economics students, historians, scholars, researchers, and professionals seeking information related to the stock market. The library's vast array of newspapers includes prominent daily publications, technical journals, and magazines.

Currently, the Buenos Aires Stock Exchange is in the initial stages of enhancing its database system to improve the management of its 28,000 entries. This new project aims to utilize the BCBA Library's bibliographic resources to support the Economic and Social Information Network of Networks (UNIRED), which facilitates access to a vast repository of 1.3 million bibliographic entries from libraries nationwide. As an active member of UNIRED, the BCBA Library plays a crucial role in enabling access to this extensive collection of knowledge.

== See also ==
- Economy of Argentina
- List of stock exchanges
- List of American stock exchanges
