= Argentina and the International Monetary Fund =

Flag of Argentina

Argentina became a member of the International Monetary Fund (IMF) on September 20, 1956. The country's relationship with the Fund has been one of the most extensive and tumultuous of any member state, characterized by numerous bailouts, a major default, and repeated periods of intense policy conditionality. Argentina holds the record for the largest financial arrangement in IMF history.

== Overview ==
Since joining the IMF, Argentina has entered into 21 financial arrangements with the Fund. The first Stand-By Arrangement (SBA) commenced on December 2, 1958, and the most recent SBA was approved on June 20, 2018, expiring on June 19, 2021. A significant period of independence from the IMF occurred during the presidencies of Néstor Kirchner and Cristina Fernández de Kirchner, when Argentina fully repaid its IMF debts in 2006. However, economic instability led to a return to the Fund under President Mauricio Macri in 2016, culminating in the record-breaking 2018 arrangement.

== The 2001 economic crisis and default ==
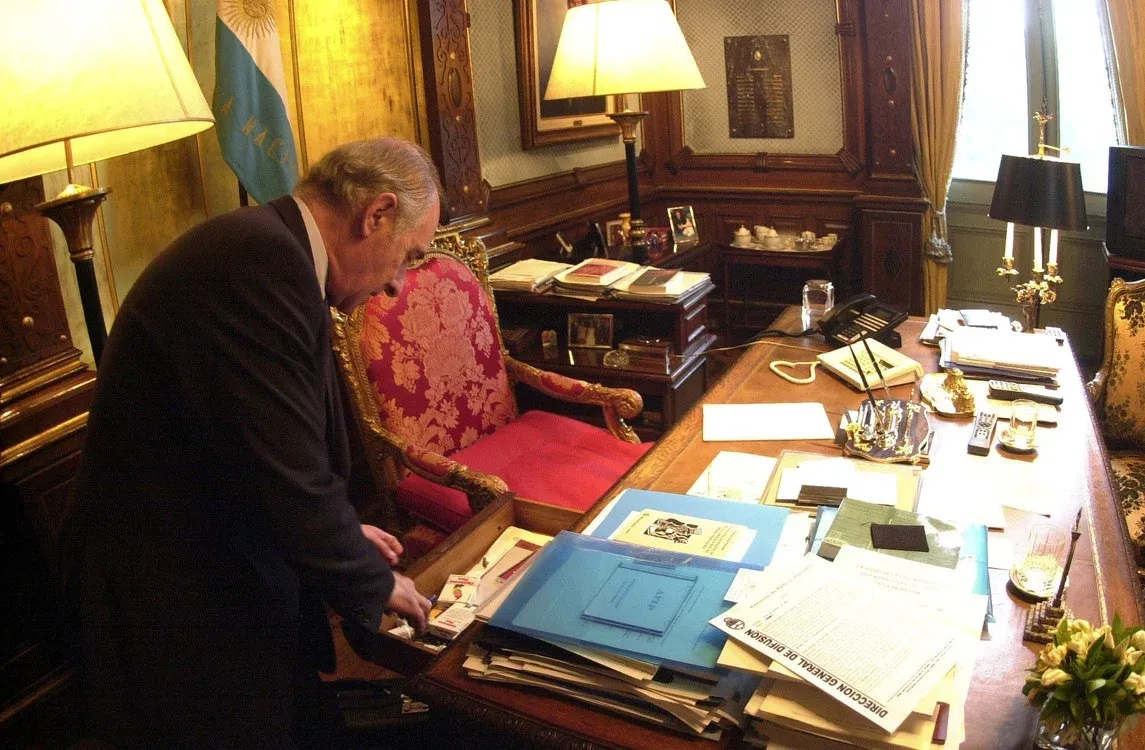
President Fernando de la Rúa leaving the presidential office after his resignation

The Argentine economic crisis of 2001-2002 was a watershed moment in the nation's modern history. The crisis had its roots in the convertibility plan of the 1990s, which pegged the Argentine peso to the U.S. dollar, and was exacerbated by extensive public borrowing during the presidency of Carlos Menem and dwindling tax revenues under his successor, Fernando de la Rúa.

A loss of confidence triggered a massive flight of capital. In a desperate attempt to prevent a collapse of the banking system, Minister Domingo Cavallo imposed the Corralito, a set of measures that froze bank accounts and severely restricted cash withdrawals. This move sparked widespread social unrest, known as the December 2001 crisis, which led to the resignation of President de la Rúa.

On December 5, 2001, the IMF announced it would suspend financial support, citing Argentina's failure to meet the fiscal targets attached to its loans. Shortly thereafter, on December 23, interim President Adolfo Rodríguez Saá declared the largest sovereign default in history at that time, on over $80 billion in debt. The debt with the IMF, however, was not declared in default. He resigned just days later, plunging the country into further political instability.

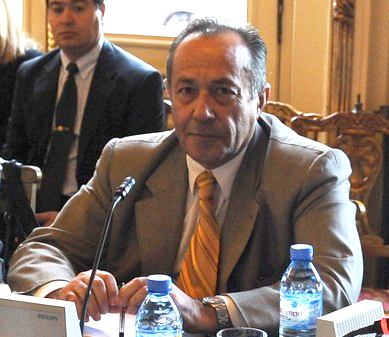
President Adolfo Rodríguez Saá

== The 2018 Stand-By Arrangement ==
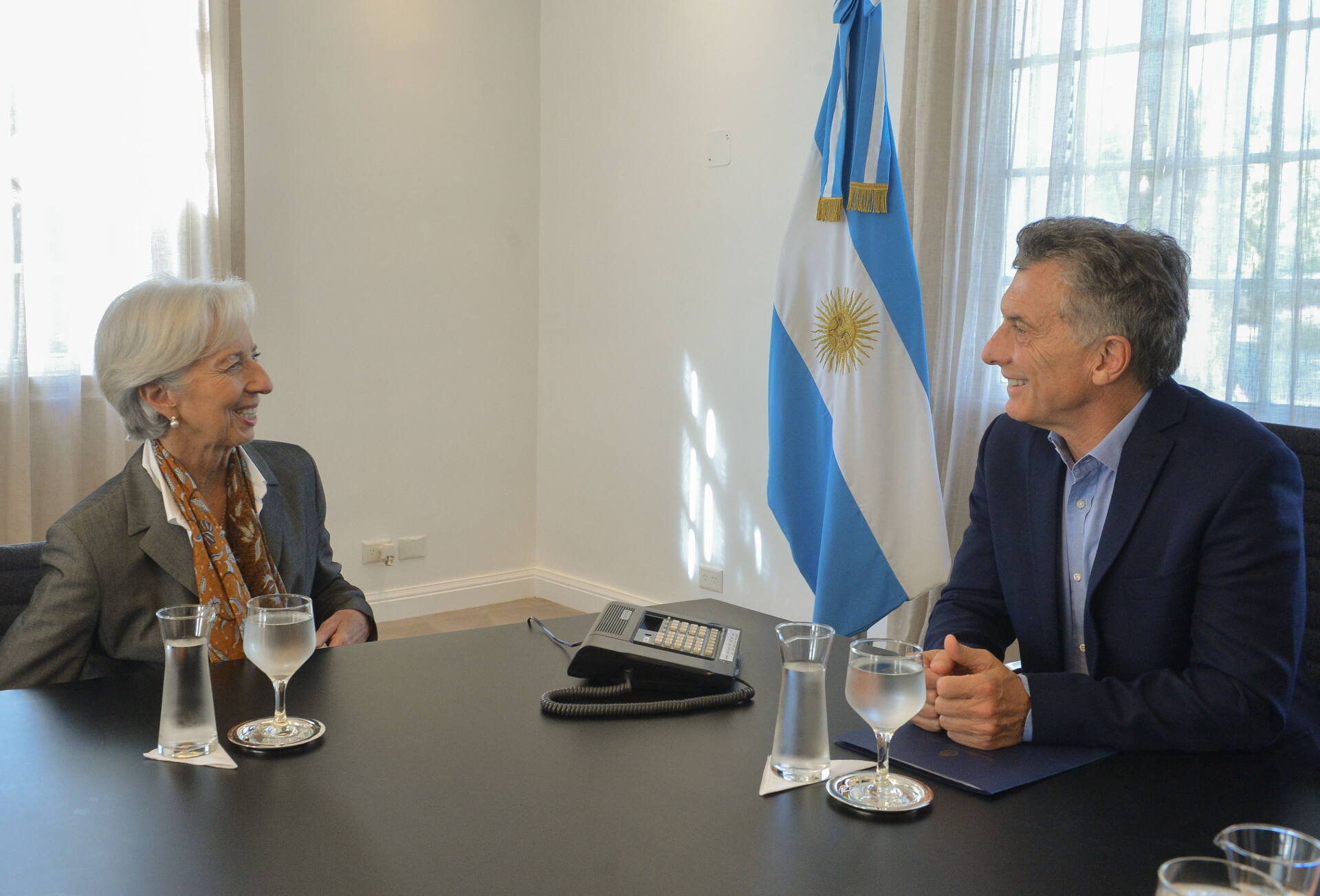
IMF Managing Director Christine Lagarde negotiating with President Mauricio Macri

Facing renewed economic pressures, capital flight, and a rapidly depreciating currency, the government of Mauricio Macri turned to the IMF in 2018. The resulting Stand-By Arrangement was the largest in the Fund's history, approved for SDR 40.714 billion (approximately US$50 billion at the time).

The program's stated goals were to restore market confidence, reduce financing needs, place public debt on a downward trajectory, and reinforce the central bank's fight against inflation. It also included commitments to protect social spending. However, the program was widely viewed as a failure. Argentina's economy entered a recession, poverty rates increased, and the program did not stabilize the peso. The succeeding Fernández administration chose not to draw the remaining funds, and the arrangement was allowed to expire in 2021 without achieving its core objectives. The IMF later acknowledged shortcomings in its design.

== The Fernández administration (2019–2023) ==
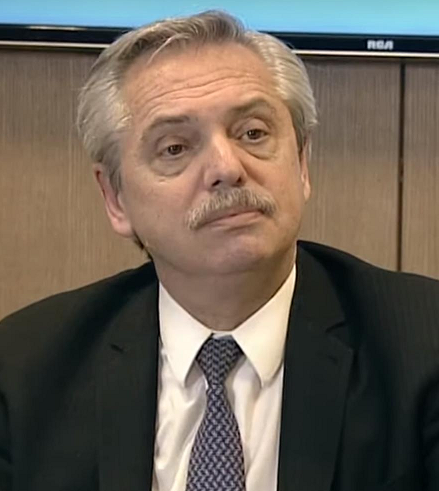
President Alberto Fernández

The economic turmoil during the final years of the Macri presidency paved the way for the election of Alberto Fernández and his vice-presidential candidate, Cristina Fernández de Kirchner, in October 2019. Many voters attributed the nation's economic woes—including high inflation and rising poverty—to Macri's policies and the IMF program.

Upon taking office, President Fernández inherited an economy in distress, with over 35% of the population living in poverty and a massive debt burden. His administration immediately began negotiations with the IMF to restructure the obligations from the 2018 SBA, pledging to spur growth while honoring the country's commitments.

== The 2022 Extended Fund Facility ==
After prolonged negotiations, the IMF Executive Board approved a new 30-month Extended Fund Facility (EFF) for Argentina on March 25, 2022. Valued at SDR 31.914 billion (about US$44 billion), this arrangement was designed to replace the failed 2018 SBA and provide a more sustainable framework for Argentina's debt repayment.

The key objectives of the EFF were to strengthen public finances through more sustainable fiscal policy, combat inflation, protect social spending, and foster inclusive growth. The program acknowledged the profound social and economic challenges facing the country, exacerbated by the COVID-19 pandemic.

== The Milei presidency (2023–present) ==
On November 19, 2023, libertarian economist Javier Milei won the presidency, defeating Peronist candidate Sergio Massa. Milei's victory was largely driven by voter anger over an economic crisis marked by an annual inflation rate exceeding 140%. Upon taking office, he promised a severe austerity program and a "chainsaw" to public spending.

Milei's relationship with the IMF has been one of pragmatic negotiation. While he has been highly critical of the Fund in the past, his administration has committed to honoring Argentina's obligations under the 2022 EFF, recognizing the necessity of the Fund's support. His government is engaged in ongoing negotiations to restructure the repayment schedule. In a notable speech at the World Economic Forum in 2024, Milei argued that the West's economic decline was due to a departure from the principles of classical liberalism, blaming "social justice" and collectivism.

Six months into his term, the economic situation remained dire, with inflation peaking at over 250% and the economy in a deep recession. In June 2024, Milei secured the passage of a significant liberal economic reform bill through the senate, aimed at attracting foreign investment and stabilizing the economy. Argentina continues to owe more to the IMF than any other nation, with a debt-to-GDP ratio of approximately 80%.

== See also ==
- Economy of Argentina
- Latin American debt crisis
