= Economy of Argentina =

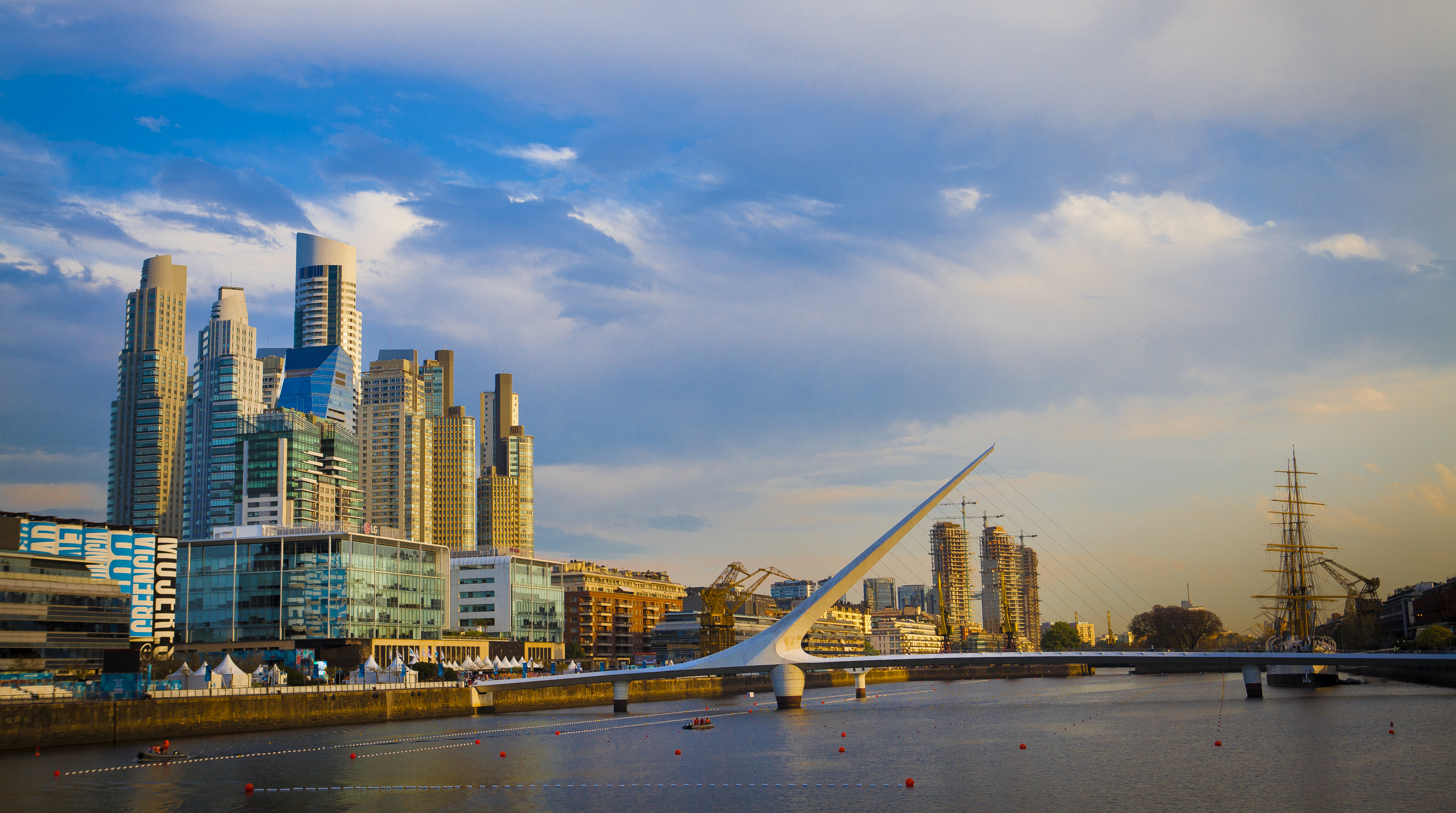
- Puerto Madero business complex in Buenos Aires CBD
- Currency: Argentine peso (ARS)
- Fiscal year: Calendar year
- Trade organizations: WTO, Mercosur, Prosur, G-20
- Country group: Developing/Emerging; Upper-middle income economy

Statistics
- Population: ▲46,044,703 (2022)
- GDP: ▲$768.21 billion (nominal; 2026); ▲$1.58 trillion (PPP; 2026)
- GDP rank: 23rd (nominal; 2026); 29th (PPP; 2026)
- GDP growth: 2.1% (2026); 3.5% (2027); 4.2% (2028)
- GDP per capita: ▲$16,021 (nominal; 2026); ▲$32,899 (PPP; 2026)
- GDP per capita rank: 70th (nominal; 2026); 69th (PPP; 2026)
- GDP per capita growth: 4.0% (2025)
- GDP by sector: Agriculture, forestry, and fishing: 6.0%; mining: 3.6%; manufacturing: 17.2%; construction: 5.6%; commerce and tourism: 16.9%; transport, communications, and utilities: 7.9%; government: 9.5%; business, social and other services: 33.3%; (2015)
- Inflation (CPI): ▼31.8% (September 2025) (INDEC)
- Population below national poverty line: ▼31.7% (2025); ▼7.3% living in extreme poverty (2025)
- Gini coefficient: ▲42.4 medium (2023)
- Human Development Index: ▲0.865 very high (2023) (47th); ▲0.761 high IHDI (45th) (2023)
- Labor force: ▲21,339,080 (2022); ▲55.1% employment rate (2021)
- Labor force by occupation: Agricultural 7.3%; manufacturing 13.1%; construction 7.6%; commerce and tourism 21.4%; transport, communications and utilities 7.8%; financial, real estate and business service, 9.4%; public administration and defense 6.3%; social services and other 27.1% (2006)
- Unemployment: ▼6.3% (2025) (IMF)
- Youth unemployment: 19.2% (2025)
- Average gross salary: US$1135 monthly (AR$1,468,135.75) (June 2025)
- Main industries: Food processing and beverages; motor vehicles and auto parts; appliances and electronics; machinery and equipment; chemicals; pharmaceuticals; glass; steel and aluminum; cement; textiles; tobacco products; publishing; furniture; leather

External
- Exports: ▲$87.07 billion (2025)
- Export goods: Soybeans and derivatives (soybean meal and soybean oil), maize, wheat, vehicles, beef, petroleum and gas, lithium, wine, sunflower, sunflower oil, pear, tobacco, barley, rice, honey, wool
- Main export partners: Brazil 14.7%; China 11.3%; European Union 9.7%; United States 9.6%; (2025)
- Imports: ▲$75.79 billion (2025)
- Import goods: Motor vehicles, Auto parts and accessories, Mineral fuels and oils, Medicines and pharmaceutical products, Industrial machinery and equipment, Fertilizers, Plastics, Telecommunications equipment
- Main import partners: Brazil 24.3%; China 23.7%; European Union 13.8%; United States 8.8%; (2025)
- FDI stock: ▲$76.58 billion (31 December 2017 est.); ▲ Abroad: $40.94 billion (31 December 2017 est.)
- Current account: ▼ −$31.32 billion (2017 est.)
- Gross external debt: ▲$214.9 billion (31 December 2017 est.); $163.2 billion; of which public, $92.5 billion (March 2016)

Public finance
- Government debt: ▼73.1% of GDP (2025)
- Foreign reserves: ▼$26.10 billion (July 2023)
- Budget balance: −15% (of GDP) (2023 est.)
- Revenue: 120.6 billion (2017 est.) *$142.9 billion (2015) (social security, 25.9%; income and capital gains, 23.6%; value-added sales tax, 20.1%; trade and duties, 15.1%; financial tax, 6.3%; excise and other, 9.0%)
- Spending: 158.6 billion (2017 est.) *$167.3 billion (2015) (social security, 38.8%; subsidies and infrastructure, 22.5%; debt service, 9.2%; education, culture and research, 8.8%; social assistance, 5.4%; health, 3.4%; security, 3.1%; defense, 2.1%; other, 6.7%)
- Credit rating: Standard & Poor's: B- (Domestic); SD (Foreign); B- (T&C Assessment)
- All values, unless otherwise stated, are in US dollars.

The economy of Argentina is the second-largest in South America, behind Brazil. The United Nations' Human Development Index ranks Argentina "very high," reflecting a literate population, export-oriented agriculture, and diversified industry. Under President Javier Milei, the country is a market economy, differing from the Peronist model earlier. The economy has rich natural resources; however, its performance has been volatile—growth spurts alternate with recessions—especially since the late 20th century, driving income inequality and poverty. Early in the 20th century, Argentina's per capita GDP ranked among the top 10 globally, at par with Canada and Australia and ahead of France and Italy.

The Argentine peso lost ~50% of its value in 2018 because of hyperinflation (falling from ~18–20 to >38 pesos per U.S. dollar), prompting an IMF stand-by program. It fell another 25% in 2019, 90% in 2020, 68% in 2021, and 50% in 2022, 54% in 2023, 30% in 2024, before rising in 2025. The FTSE Global Equity Index (2018) listed Argentina as an emerging market and G20 member. Prolonged capital controls led MSCI to reclassify it as a standalone market in 2021.

== History ==
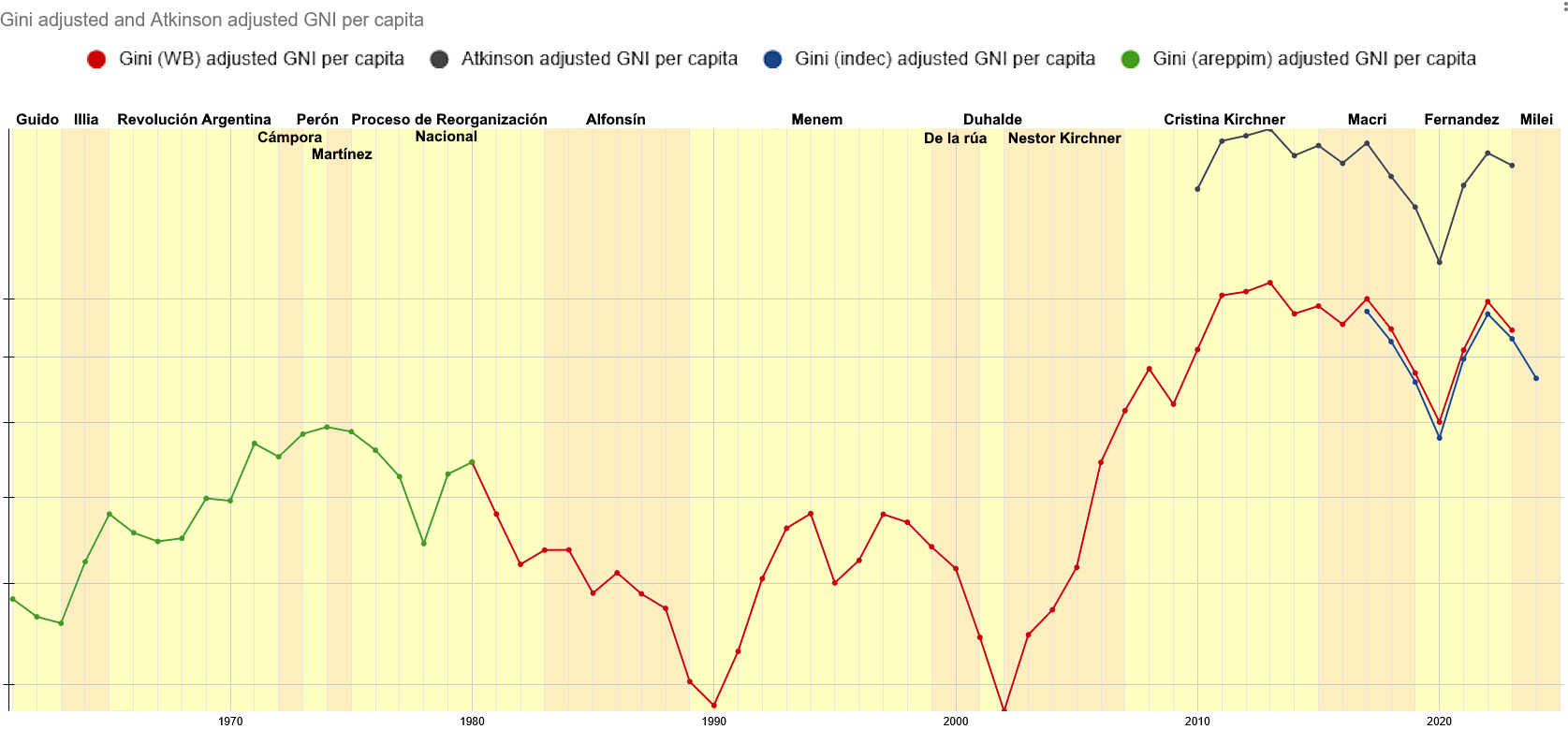
GNI per capita since 1961, adjusted for inequality.

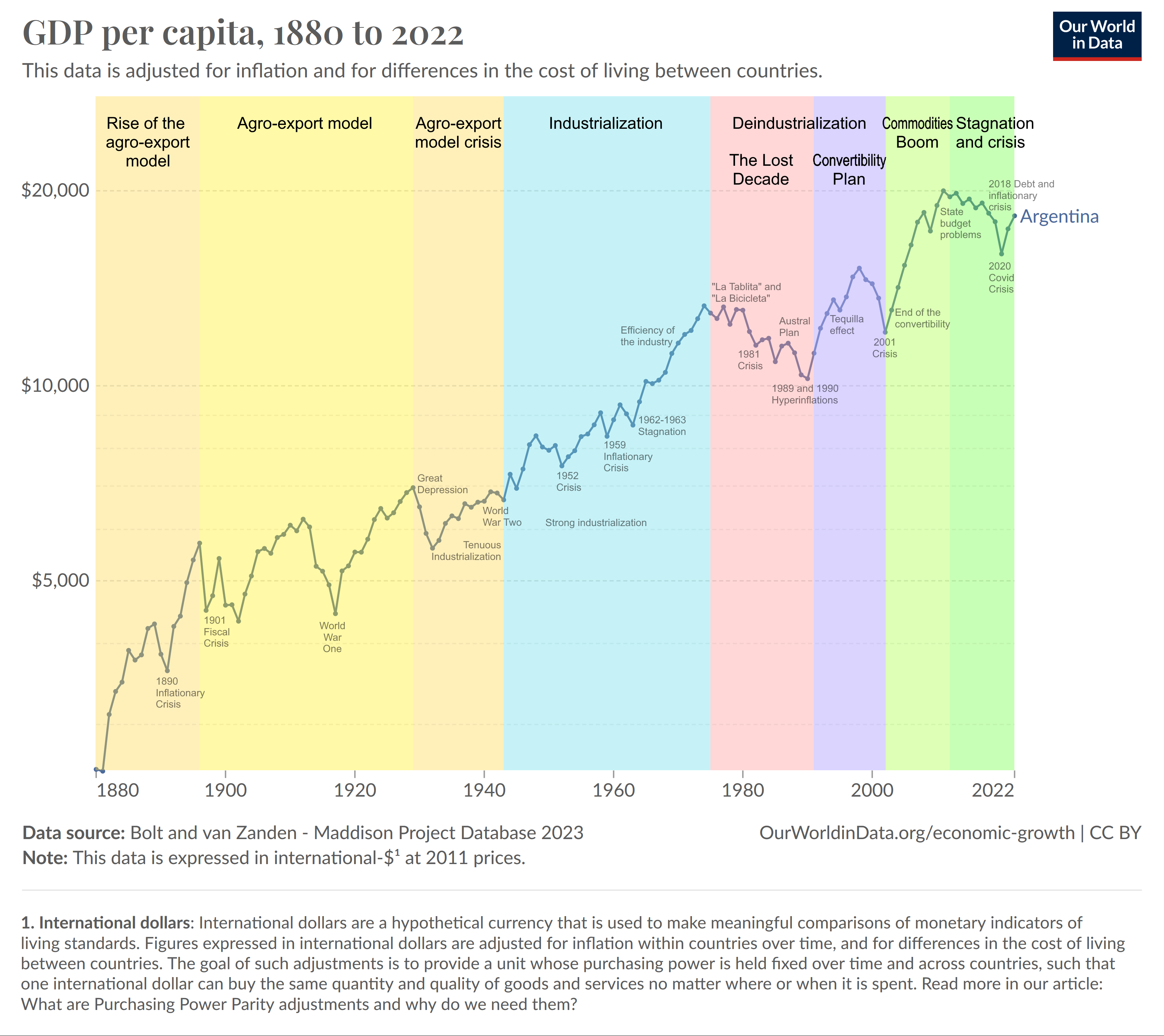
GDP per capita, 1880 to 2022.

Argentina's economy has swung from one of the world's richest in the early 20th century to repeated cycles of boom, bust, and hyperinflation, driven by commodity dependence, political instability, and policy shifts. Below is a summarized timeline based on historical data, with updates to 2025 reflecting recent reforms under Milei.

=== Pre-20th Century Foundations (Before 1880s) ===
Before the 1880s, Argentina's economy relied on salted meat, wool, leather, and hides for exports and income, with limited industrialization.

=== Golden age (1880–1905) ===
Argentina was one of the wealthiest countries in the world:

Argentina began the 20th century as one of the wealthiest places on the planet. In 1913, it was richer than France or Germany, almost twice as prosperous as Spain, and its per capita GDP was almost as high as that of Canada.

— Edward L. Glaeser, Rafael Di Tella, Lucas Llach, Introduction to Argentine exceptionalism

From 1880–1905, British and French investments fueled livestock and grain exports, sparking rapid expansion and mass European immigration. GDP grew 7.5 times (8% annual average); per capita GDP rose from 35% to 80% of the U.S. level. A 2009 study noted GDP gains post-1870 but stagnant heights (proxy for welfare) until 1910, indicating uneven benefits.

During 1905–1941 growth slowed; although per capita GDP reached ~50% of U.S. levels by 1941, matching Western Europe's but with inequality.

=== Great Depression (1929–1932) ===
The Great Depression severely contracted the Argentine economy by sharply curtailing foreign trade, triggering a structural shift away from agro-export dependence. In response, successive governments pursued import substitution industrialization, raising tariffs to shelter domestic manufacturers from foreign competition. The Roca–Runciman Treaty (1933), negotiated to preserve Argentine beef access to British markets following the Ottawa Conference, was widely criticized by Argentine nationalists as an asymmetrical concession to British commercial interests.

=== Perón era (1945–1955) ===
Juan Perón nationalized the Central Bank, railways, and industries. Inflation averaged 26% annually (1944–1974); GDP per capita peaked in the early 1950s, but stagnated due to commodity slumps and nationalizations.

Argentine industry benefited from the inability of European countries to supply their products to the world market. Industrial manufactures were exported in considerable volumes, mainly to Latin America and the Caribbean. Some of the policies adopted at that time included rediscounts, the Export and Industrial and Commercial Stimulus Committee, the Industrial Promotion Laws, the creation of the State merchant fleet, credits from the Banco Industrial (1944), and the nationalization of the Central Bank of Argentina (1946). Following Keynesian theories, Perón sought to establish the welfare state, by increasing social security and improving income distribution. He did this through raising public spending and making simultaneous investments in different sectors such as defense, health, education, and housing. Production grew, and the increase in exports fed into an expansion of consumption.

=== Debt crisis and hyperinflation (1976–1990s) ===
From 1976–1983, the National Reorganization Process attempted neoliberal policies under José Alfredo Martínez de Hoz ballooned debt; inflation hit 344% in 1983, the currency devalued 10x, while growth stalled.

Stagflation ensued from 1975–1990, driven by increasing debt, tax evasion, and flight; hyperinflation peaked from 1989–1990.

In 1991 under Domingo Cavallo, the government attempted reforms, pegging the peso to the dollar. With the money supply curbed, inflation fell to single digits. Liberalization/privatization boosted GDP 33% in four years. Erratic growth came after 1995. In 2001 a crisis shrank GDP by 20%, unemployment reached 25%, the peso declined by 70%.

=== Commodity boom and Kirchner recovery (2002–2015) ===
From 2003–2011, expansionary policies and increased exports created >5M jobs. GDP nearly doubled (7.1% avg. annual, 9% 2003–2007). Real wages rose 72% (2003–2013). Postal, water, pensions, Aerolíneas Argentinas, YPF, railways were renationalized. A crisis stopped growth in 2009, although it rebounded to 9% (2010–2011).

During 2012–2015 capital controls, austerity, inflation, and trade slumps cut growth to 1.3% (2012–2014), edging up to 2.4% (2015).

=== Debt restructuring (2000s–2010s) ===
From 2005 to 2010 Argentina restructured $100B in loans. In 2001 it defaulted. Some bondholders rejected the restructuring, preventing it from going final. Debt service reached ~$14B.

In 2018 the IMF completed a bailout – $30B as inflation hit 25%; interest rates reached 40% (world's highest). Inflation hit 54% in 2019 and 211% in 2023.

=== Milei: shock therapy (2023–2025) ===
In 2023 inflation crossed 100% and then 200%. Milei (elected with a 55.7% majority) devalued the peso 50–54% to ~800/USD. He cut subsidies/public works ($20B savings), achieved Argentina's first federal budget surplus since 2012.

In 2024, Milei cut 15,000 state jobs, sparking protests. Layoffs grew to over 24,000 by mid-year. Poverty peaked at 57% in January, falling to 38.9–39% in Q3. Inflation crashed to 2.4% in November, falling by almost half at 117.8%, down 93.6 percentage points from 2023's 211.4%. GDP fell between 3.8–4%.

In 2026, the Central Bank of Argentina (BCRA) met its dollar accumulation goal of 10.1 billion in the first six months of the year. Aggressive privatization and debt restructuring with the IMF has led to the S&P Global Ratings agency to upgrade Argentina's sovereign credit rating to a B−.

Growth summary
Period	Driver	GDP Growth (Annual Average %)	Per Capita vs. U.S. (%)
1880–1905	Exports/Immigration	8	35 → 80
1905–1941	Industrialization	3–4	~50
1945–1970s	Nationalization	40–45	
1976–1990	Debt/Inflation	30–35	
1991–2001	Peg/Liberalization	4 (then crash)	35
2003–2011	Commodities	7	40
2012–2023	Crises/Inflation	1	25–30
2024–2025	Austerity Reforms	-4	

== Data ==
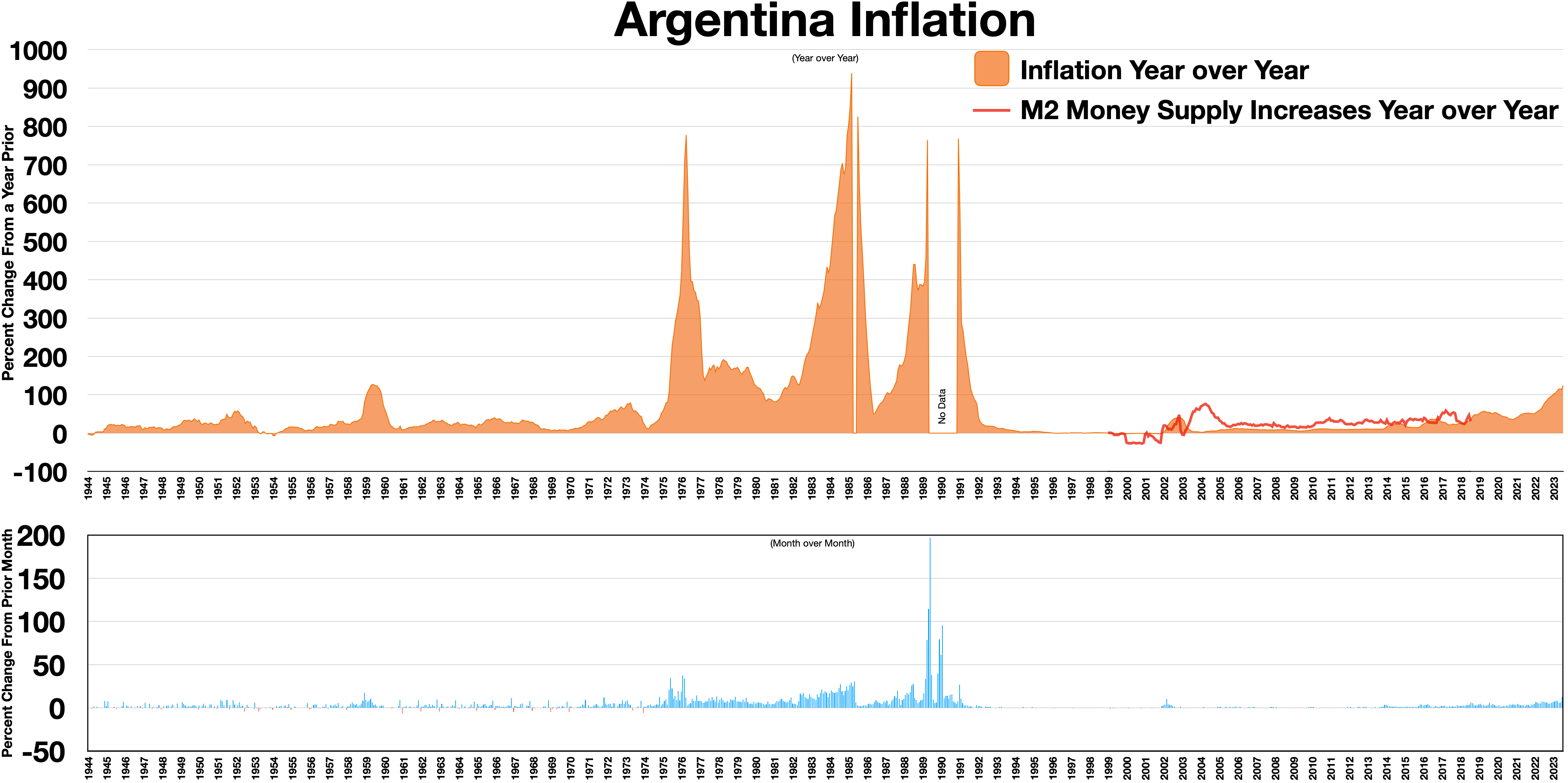
Argentina Inflation Year over Year inflation M2 money supply increases Year over Year Month over Month inflation

The following table shows the main economic indicators in 1980–2023, with IMF staff estimates for 2024–2028. NOTE: IMF estimates do not reflect the real figures of 2024 and the years after it, as it is outdated. Inflation below 5% is in green.

Main Economic Indicators
Year	GDP (in bn. US$PPP)	GDP per capita (in US$ PPP)	GDP (in bn. US$nominal)	GDP per capita (in US$ nominal)	GDP growth (real)	Annual inflation rate (in Percent)	Unemployment (in Percent)	Government debt (in % of GDP)
1980	172.5	6,172.5	233.7	8,361.2	▲0.7%	n/a	3.0%	n/a
1981	▲178.0	▲6,256.5	▼189.8	▼6,671.4	▼ -5.7%	n/a	▲5.0%	n/a
1982	▲183.0	▲6,327.2	▼94.3	▼3,257.9	▼ -3.1%	n/a	▼4.5%	n/a
1983	▲197.3	▲6,725.1	▲116.3	▲3,962.7	▲3.7%	n/a	▲5.0%	n/a
1984	▲208.5	▲6,988.1	▲130.5	▲4,374.8	▲2.0%	n/a	5.0%	n/a
1985	▼200.2	▼6,595.2	▼98.6	▼3,248.7	▼ -7.0%	n/a	▲6.3%	n/a
1986	▲218.8	▲7,117.3	▲118.6	▲3,857.0	▲7.1%	n/a	▲6.3%	n/a
1987	▲229.9	▲7,393.6	▲121.6	▲3,910.0	▲2.5%	n/a	▼6.0%	n/a
1988	▲233.3	▲7,413.9	▲142.4	▲4,524.5	▼ -2.0%	n/a	▲6.5%	n/a
1989	▼225.5	▼7,077.1	▼91.4	▼2,867.3	▼ -7.0%	n/a	▲8.0%	n/a
1990	▲230.8	▲7,094.5	▲158.0	▲4,857.8	▼ -1.3%	n/a	▼7.6%	n/a
1991	▲263.6	▲7,996.3	▲212.0	▲6,429.5	▲10.5%	n/a	▼6.5%	n/a
1992	▲297.4	▲8,899.4	▲255.8	▲7,653.7	▲10.3%	n/a	▲7.1%	25.0%
1993	▲323.5	▲9,537.8	▲264.4	▲7,796.2	▲6.3%	n/a	▲11.6%	▲26.9%
1994	▲349.7	▲10,178.7	▲287.8	▲8,378.7	▲5.8%	n/a	▲13.3%	▲28.4%
1995	▼346.8	▼9,972.8	▲288.5	▼8,295.1	▼ -2.8%	n/a	▲18.9%	▲30.7%
1996	▲372.7	▲10,589.9	▲304.3	▲8,645.5	▲5.5%	n/a	▼18.8%	▲32.6%
1997	▲409.9	▲11,512.5	▲327.4	▲9,196.5	▲8.1%	n/a	▼16.8%	▼31.7%
1998	▲430.5	▲11,955.7	▲334.2	▲9,283.2	▲3.9%	▲0.9%	▼14.8%	▲34.1%
1999	▼421.8	▼11,587.1	▼317.0	▼8,709.1	▼ -3.4%	▲ -1.2%	▲16.1%	▲38.9%
2000	▲427.9	▲11,633.0	▲317.8	▼8,638.5	▼ -0.8%	▲ -0.9%	▲17.1%	▲40.8%
2001	▼418.3	▼11,256.7	▼300.4	▼8,085.4	▼ -4.4%	▲ -1.1%	▲19.2%	▲48.0%
2002	▼378.5	▼10,089.1	▼112.5	▼2,997.6	▼ -10.9%	▲25.9%	▲22.5%	▲147.2%
2003	▲420.5	▲11,104.7	▲142.4	▲3,761.1	▲9.0%	▲13.4%	▼17.3%	▼125.2%
2004	▲470.3	▲12,303.2	▲164.9	▲4,314.1	▲8.9%	▲4.4%	▼13.6%	▼117.9%
2005	▲528.0	▲13,681.2	▲199.3	▲5,163.6	▲8.9%	▲9.6%	▼11.6%	▼80.3%
2006	▲588.1	▲15,090.3	▲232.9	▲5,976.1	▲8.0%	▲10.9%	▼10.2%	▼70.8%
2007	▲658.4	▲16,728.5	▲287.9	▲7,315.7	▲9.0%	▲8.8%	▼8.5%	▼62.1%
2008	▲698.2	▲17,567.3	▲363.5	▲9,146.8	▲4.1%	▲8.6%	▼7.9%	▼53.8%
2009	▼661.1	▼16,472.3	▼334.6	▼8,337.8	▼ -5.9%	▲6.3%	▲8.7%	▲55.4%
2010	▲736.8	▲18,063.9	▲424.7	▲10,413.0	▲10.1%	▲10.5%	▼7.8%	▼43.5%
2011	▲797.3	▲19,322.2	▲527.6	▲12,787.8	▲6.0%	▲9.8%	▼7.2%	▼38.9%
2012	▲819.7	▲19,641.4	▲579.7	▲13,889.8	▼ -1.0%	▲10.0%	▲7.2%	▲40.4%
2013	▲849.6	▲20,131.7	▲611.5	▲14,488.8	▲2.4%	▲10.6%	▼7.1%	▲43.5%
2014	▼839.9	▼19,683.8	▼563.6	▼13,208.8	▼ -2.5%	n/a	▲7.3%	▲44.7%
2015	▲867.2	▲20,105.2	▲642.5	▲14,895.3	▲2.7%	n/a	▼6.5%	▲52.6%
2016	▲885.2	▲20,307.9	▼556.8	▼12,772.9	▼ -2.1%	n/a	▲8.5%	▲53.1%
2017	▲1,039.3	▲23,597.1	▲643.9	▲14,618.3	▲2.8%	▲25.7%	▼8.4%	▲57.0%
2018	▼1,036.3	▼23,290.6	▼524.4	▼11,786.4	▼ -2.6%	▲34.3%	▲9.2%	▲85.2%
2019	▼1,033.7	▼23,007.8	▼451.8	▼10,054.0	▼ -2.0%	▲53.5%	▲9.8%	▲88.8%
2020	▼942.2	▼20,792.5	▼389.1	▼8,571.9	▼ -9.9%	▲42.0%	▲11.6%	▲102.8%
2021	▲1,083.4	▲23,817.0	▲486.7	▲10,631.7	▲10.7%	▲48.4%	▼8.7%	▼80.8%
2022	▲1,226.2	▲26,483.6	▲630.6	▲13,619.9	▲5.0%	▲72.4%	▼6.8%	▲84.7%
2023	▲1,239.5	▲26,506.1	▼621.8	▲13,297.4	▼ -2.5%	▲121.7%	▲7.4%	▲89.5%
2024	▲1,302.5	▲27,576.3	▲632.6	▼13,394.3	▲2.8%	▲93.7%	▼7.2%	▼79.9%
2025	▲1,371.9	▲28,758.8	▲635.9	▼13,330.5	▲3.3%	▲54.1%	7.2%	▼76.8%
2026	▲1,440.5	▲29,897.4	▲660.3	▲13,704.4	▲3.0%	▲42.1%	▼7.0%	▼75.6%
2027	▲1,507.2	▲30,971.6	▲695.3	▲14,288.0	▲2.8%	▲37.1%	7.0%	▼73.3%
2028	▲1,573.4	▲32,014.0	▲728.1	▲14,813.3	▲2.5%	▲32.5%	7.0%	▼69.5%

GDP growth during 2025 was 4.4%. The nominal monthly median per capita income was 450,000 Argentine peso in Q4 2025.

== Sectors ==
=== Agriculture ===
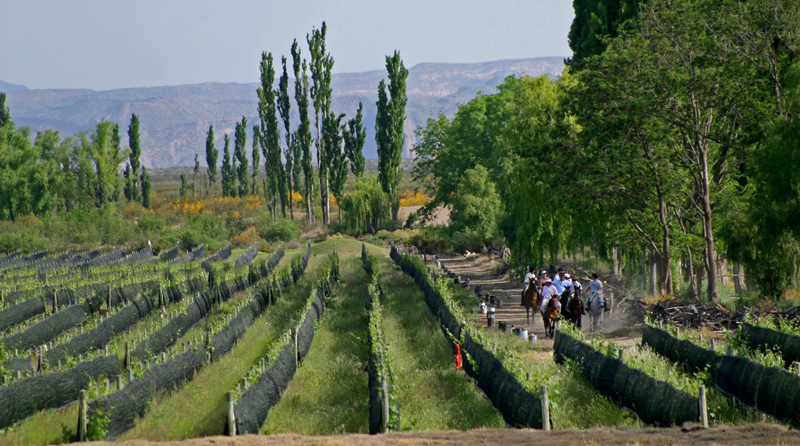
Vineyard in Mendoza Province. Argentina ranks as the fifth largest wine producer worldwide.

Argentina ranks among major global agricultural producers. It leads in beef exports, citrus, grapes, honey, maize, sorghum, soybeans, squash, sunflower seeds, wheat, and yerba mate. The sector contributed 9% of GDP in 2010. It generated one fifth of exports, excluding processed food and feed, which amounted to another third. Farmers harvested 103 million tons that year. Oilseeds, mainly soy and sunflower, exceeded 54 million tons. Cereals, mainly maize, wheat, and sorghum, surpassed 46 million tons. In recent years, maize output has increased significantly; between 2000 and 2023, production rose by a factor of 3.74, while the planting area expanded by 3.18 times. During this period, the average yield per unit increased by approximately 26%. The country led world production of yerba mate. It ranked among the top five for soy, maize, sunflower seed, lemon, and pear. It placed in the top ten for barley, grape, artichoke, tobacco, and cotton. It stood among the top 15 for wheat, sugarcane, sorghum, and grapefruit.

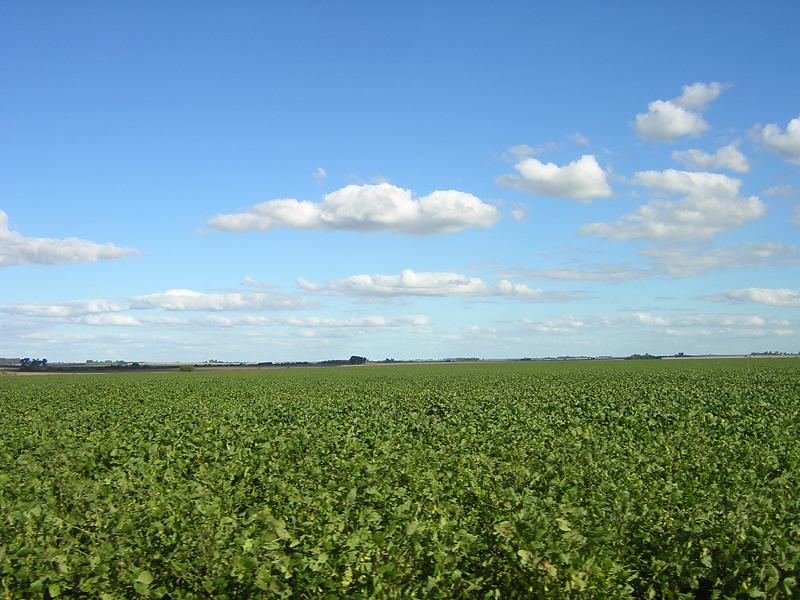
Soy field in Argentina's fertile Pampas. The versatile legume makes up about half the nation's crop production.

Sunflower seed production made Argentina one of the largest globally, with 2.2 million tons in 2010. That year, output included 2.3 million tons of potato, almost 2 million tons of lemon, 1.3 million tons of rice, 1 million tons of orange, 921 thousand tons of peanut, 813 thousand tons of cotton, 707 thousand tons of onion, 656 thousand tons of tomato, 565 thousand tons of pear, 510 thousand tons of apple, 491 thousand tons of oats, 473 thousand tons of beans, 431 thousand tons of tangerine, 302 thousand tons of yerba mate, 283 thousand tons of carrot, 226 thousand tons of peach, 194 thousand tons of cassava, 174 thousand tons of olives, 174 thousand tons of banana, 148 thousand tons of garlic, 114 thousand tons of grapefruit, and 110 thousand tons of artichoke, plus smaller crops.

==== Livestock ====
In 2019, producers raised 3 million tons of beef, fourth globally behind the US, Brazil, and China. They generated the fourth most honey, tenth most wool, 13th most chicken meat, 23rd most pork, 18th most cow's milk, and the 14th most chicken eggs. Soy and byproducts, mainly animal feed and vegetable oils, formed one fourth of export raw materials. Cereals added 10%. Cattle raising supports domestic needs. Beef, leather, and dairy reached 5% of exports. Sheep raising and wool thrive in Patagonia, though output halved since 1990. Biodiesel exports exceeded US$2 billion in 2011.

==== Crops by region ====
Apples and pears grow in the Río Negro valley. Rice, oranges, and citrus dominate the northwest and Mesopotamia. Grapes and strawberries flourish in Cuyo. Berries appear in the far south. Cotton and tobacco lead in the Gran Chaco. Sugarcane and chile peppers prevail in the northwest. Olives and garlic come from the west. Farmers cultivate yerba mate tea in Misiones, tomatoes in Salta, and peaches in Mendoza for local markets. Organic farming covers nearly 3 million hectares, second only to Australia. Fine wine production advanced in quality. Total viticulture potential remains untapped. Mendoza leads wine regions, followed by San Juan.

==== Policy ====
Farmers imposed a grain embargo in March 2008 to protest export tax hikes. Strikes and lockouts ended after the Senate defeated the increase on 16 July.

==== Fisheries and forestry ====
Argentine fisheries yield about 1 million tons annually. Argentine hake comprises 50% of the catch. Workers harvest pollock, squid, and centolla crab widely. Forestry operates in most regions except the pampas. Harvesters produce almost 14 million m^{3} of roundwood. Growers plant Eucalyptus, pine, and elm for cellulose, furniture, and paper at 1.5 million tons. Fisheries and logging each generate 2% of exports.

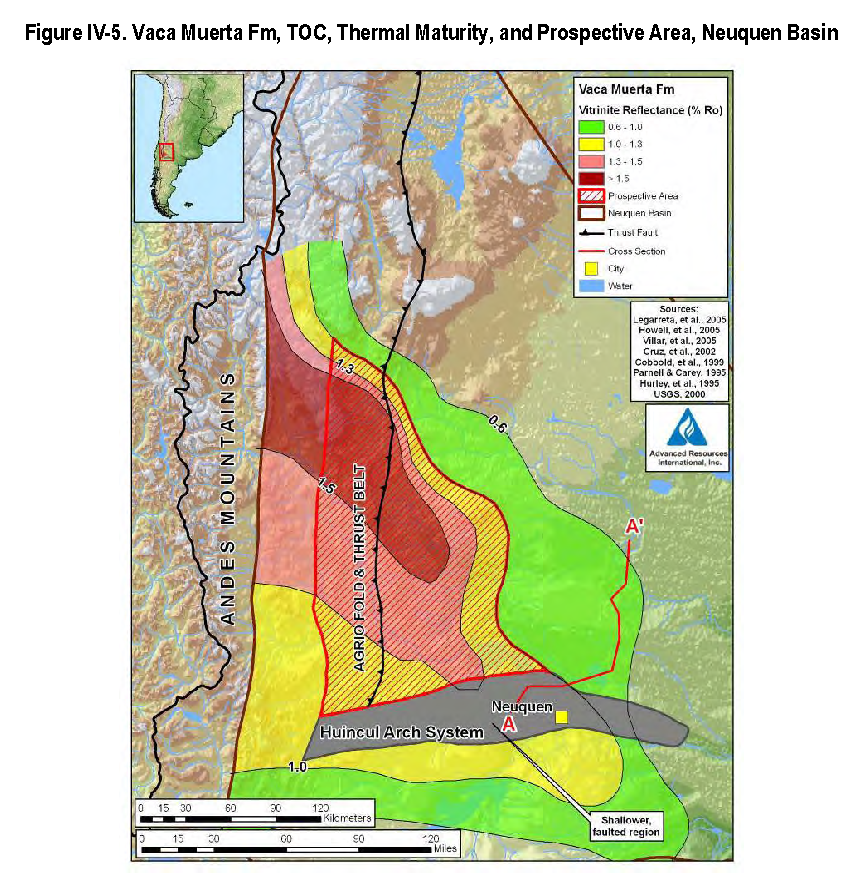
The Vaca Muerta tight oil (shale oil) field holds 2.58×10^{9} m^{3} (16.2×10^{9} bbl) of oil and 8.7×10^{12} m^{3} (308×10^{12} cu ft) of natural gas. It is estimated to be the third largest.

=== Natural resources ===
Mining and other extractive activities, such as gas and petroleum, are growing industries, increasing from 2% of GDP in 1980 to around 4% later. The northwest and San Juan Province are the main regions of activity. Coal is mined in Santa Cruz Province. Minerals mined include borate, copper, lead, magnesium, sulfur, tungsten, uranium, zinc, silver, titanium, and gold, whose production grew after 1997 via the Bajo de la Alumbrera mine in Catamarca Province and San Juan. Metal ore exports soared from US$200 million in 1996 to US$1.2 billion in 2004, and to over US$3 billion in 2010.

In 2019, Argentina was the 4th largest world producer of lithium, the 9th largest world producer of silver, the 17th largest world producer of gold and the 7th largest world producer of boron.

=== Industry ===
The World Bank lists the top industrial countries each year, based on the value of production. According to the 2019 list, Argentina had the 31st most valuable industry (57.7 billion dollars), behind Mexico, Brazil and Venezuela, but ahead of Colombia, Peru and Chile.

In 2019, Argentina was the 31st largest producer of steel, the 28th producer of vehicles, the 22nd brewer of beer, the 4th producer of soybean oil and the 3rd producer of sunflower oil, among other industrial products.

Manufacturing is the largest single sector in the Argentine economy (15% of GDP), and is well-integrated with agriculture, such that half the nation's industrial exports were agricultural. Based on food processing and textiles during the first half of the 20th century, industrial production later diversified. Leading sectors by production value were: food processing and beverages; motor vehicles and auto parts; refinery products, and biodiesel; chemicals and pharmaceuticals; steel and aluminium; and industrial and farm machinery; electronics and home appliances. Other manufactured goods included glass and cement; plastics and tires; lumber products; textiles; tobacco products; recording and print media; furniture; apparel and leather.

Most manufacturing is organized in the 314 industrial parks operating nationwide as of 2012, a fourfold increase over the past decade. Nearly half of Argentine industries are based in the Greater Buenos Aires area, although Córdoba, Rosario, and Ushuaia are also significant industrial centers; the latter city became the nation's leading electronics center during the 1980s.

==== Automotive ====
Argentina produced 791,000 motor vehicles in 2013, and exported 433,000 (mainly to Brazil, which in turn exported a somewhat larger number to Argentina); Argentina's domestic auto market reached a record 964,000 in 2013. This marked a peak in vehicle production; by 2021 production had fallen to 434,753 vehicles. Vehicles remained Argentina's top export to Brazil, accounting for $3.1bil in exports in 2021.

==== Beverage ====
Beverages became another significant sector, as Argentina continued among the top five wine producing countries; beer overtook wine production in 2000, and today leads by nearly two billion liters a year to one.

==== Defense ====
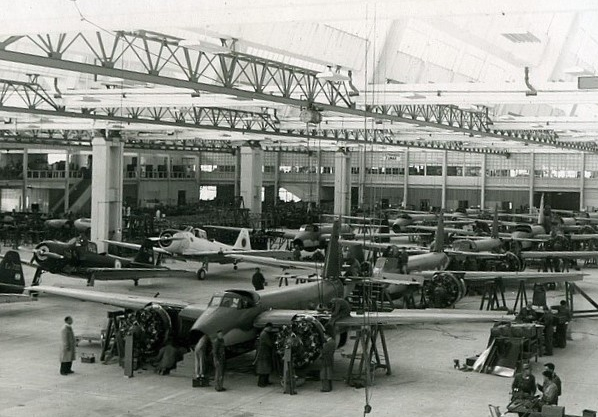
I.Ae. 24 Calquin aircraft production, 1950

The Argentine defense industry has developed, over the years, different programs to improve the armed forces of Argentina. The first major steps to establish a defense industry were made during the Second World War and they received a boost during the 1970s after the United States imposed an arms embargo due to human rights violations. The politics of privatization carried out during the 1990s virtually eliminated domestic military production, but many factories were reopened during the last years.

==== Electronics and machinery ====
The production of computers, laptops, and servers grew by 160% in 2011, to nearly 3.4 million units, and covered two-thirds of local demand. Argentina became an important manufacturer of cell phones, providing about 80% of all devices sold in the country. Production of cell phones, computers, and similar products is an assembly industry that imports the majority of the components, and uses designs originating from other countries. High labour costs for Argentina assembly work tend to limit penetration to only Latin America, protected by regional trade treaties.

Farm machinery, another important rubric historically dominated by imports, was similarly replaced by domestic production, which covered 60% of demand by 2013.

==== Petroleum ====
Around 35 million m^{3} each of petroleum and petroleum fuels are produced, as well as 50 billion m^{3} of natural gas, making the nation self-sufficient in these staples, and generating around 10% of exports. The most important oil fields lie in Patagonia and Cuyo. A network of pipelines send raw product to Bahía Blanca, center of the petrochemical industry, and to the La Plata-Greater Buenos Aires-Rosario industrial belt.

==== Construction ====
Construction permits nationwide covered over 15 million m^{2} (160 million ft^{2}) in 2013. The construction sector accounted for over 5% of GDP, and two-thirds of construction is for residential buildings.

=== Services ===
The service sector is the largest contributor to GDP, accounting for over 60%. Argentina enjoys a diversified service sector, which includes well-developed social, corporate, financial, insurance, real estate, transport, communication services, and tourism.

Trade in services remained in deficit, however, with US$15 billion in service exports in 2013 against US$19 billion in imports. Business Process Outsourcing became the leading service export, and reached US$3 billion. Advertising revenues from contracts abroad were estimated at over US$1.2 billion.

==== Banking ====
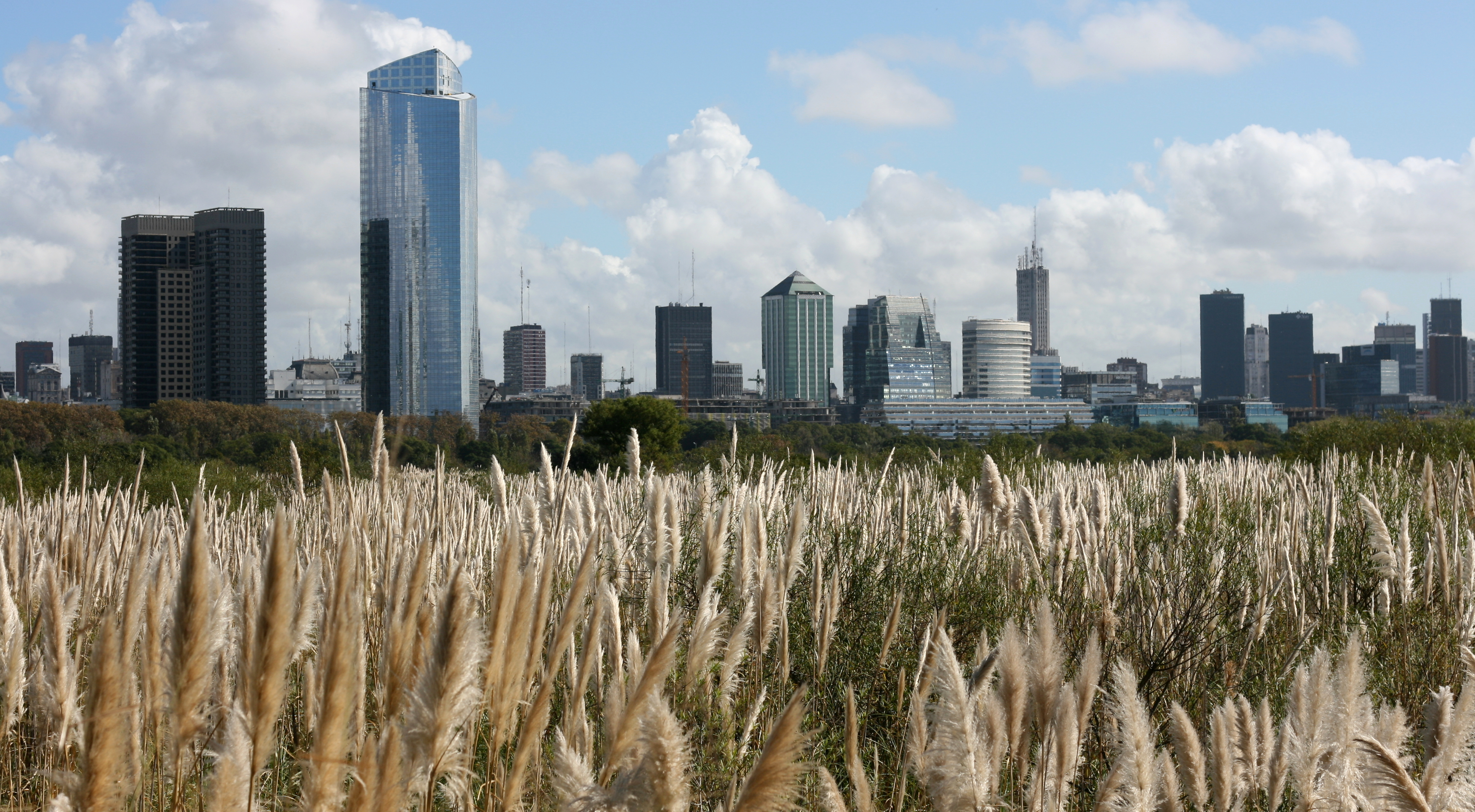
View of Buenos Aires Central Business District from the Costanera Sur Ecological Reserve

Argentine banking deposits exceeded US$120 billion in December 2012. The financial sector developed via public sector banks, but became dominated by the private sector. Private sector banks accounted for most of the 80 active institutions (over 4,000 branches) and held nearly 60% of deposits and loans, and as many foreign-owned banks as local ones operated in the country. The long-largest bank in Argentina by far, is the public Banco de la Nación Argentina. Not to be confused with the Central Bank, this institution accounts for 30% of deposits and a fifth of its loan portfolio.

During the 1990s, Argentina's financial system consolidated and strengthened. Deposits grew from less than US$15 billion in 1991 to over US$80 billion in 2000, while outstanding credit (70% of it to the private sector) tripled to nearly US$100 billion.

==== Education ====
Education in Argentina is a responsibility shared by the national government, the provinces and federal district and private institutions. Education at all levels, including university, is free. President Domingo Sarmiento's assertion that "the sovereign should be educated" has been a keystone of Argentine Education since 1918. Education has been extended nearly universally and its maintenance remains central to political and cultural debate. There are a significant number of private schools and universities despite free schooling.

Education in state institutions is at the initial, primary, secondary and tertiary levels and in the undergraduate university level (not for graduate programs). Private education is paid, although in some cases (especially in primary and secondary schools) state subsidies support its costs.

According to studies by UNESCO, guarantee equality to have institutional features that hinder the commercialization of education, as well as Finland has characteristics that favor multiethnic population education and special education, education favors Argentina equality. Illiteracy rates in Argentina are very low. According to the last census, the illiteracy rate is 1.9%, the second lowest in Latin America. In the last decade, Argentina has created nine new universities, while the outflow of university students increased by 68%.

==== Healthcare ====
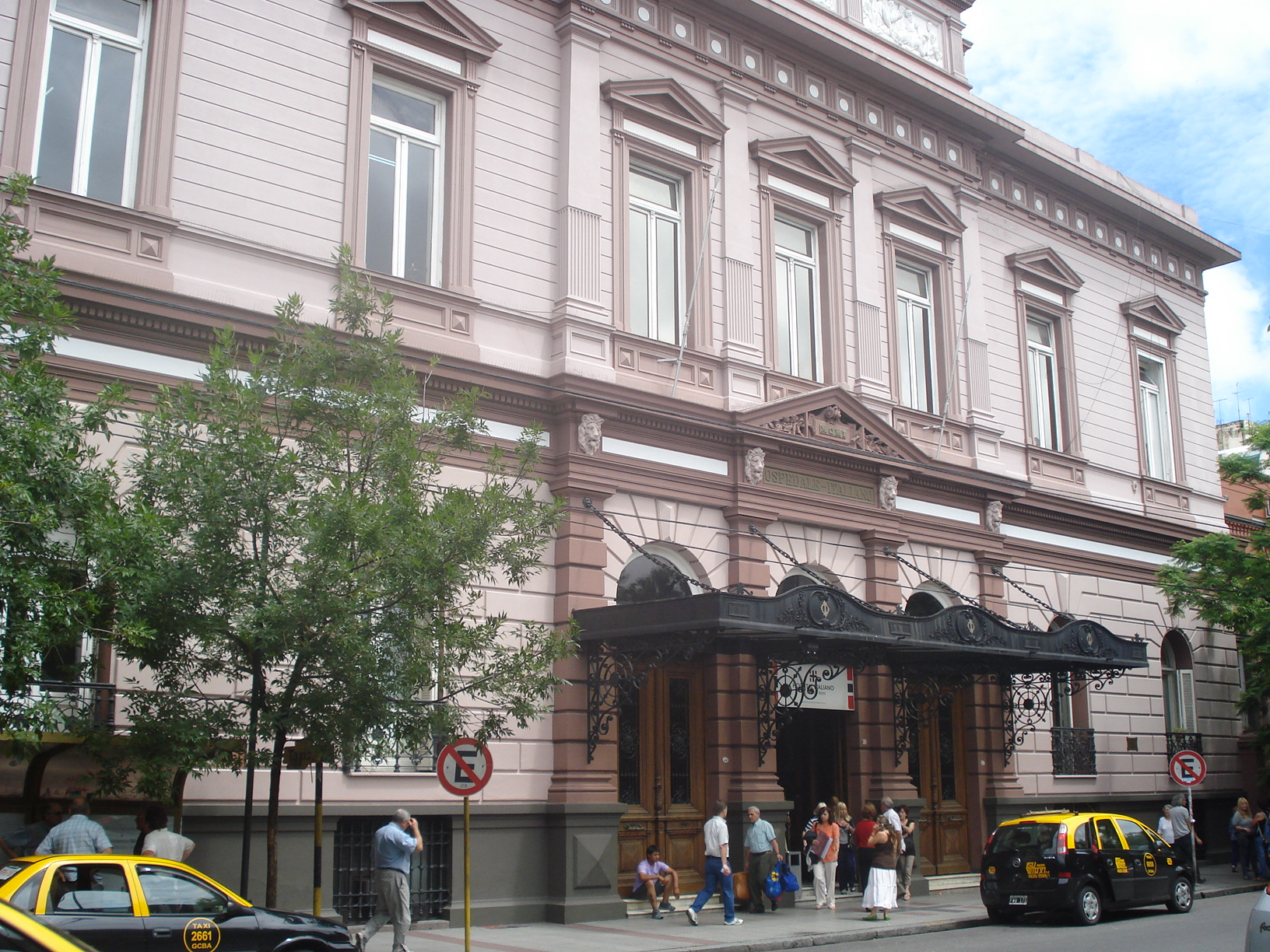
Hospital Italiano de Buenos Aires originally served the Italian Argentine community.

Life expectancy development in Argentina

Argentina's health care system is composed of a universal health care system and a private system. The government maintains a system of public medical facilities that are universally accessible to everyone in the country, but formal sector workers are also obligated to participate in one of about 300 labor union-run health insurance schemes, which offer differing levels of coverage. Private medical facilities and health insurance also exist in the country. The Ministry of Health (MSAL), oversees all three subsectors of the health care system and is responsible for setting of regulation, evaluation and collecting statistics.

==== Real estate ====
Housing in Argentina is characterized by a mix of high-rise urban apartments, particularly in Buenos Aires, and suburban ranch-style homes, with over two-fifths of capital residents renting.

==== Telecommunications ====
The telecommunications sector grew at a fast pace, and the economy benefited from communications services. 77% of the population had access to mobile phones in 2011, 95% of whom used smartphones as of 2015; Internet access reached over 32 million users, or 75% of the population; and broadband services. Landline telephone services reached over 9.5 million households. Telecom revenues reached more than $17.8 billion in 2013, and while only one in three retail stores in Argentina accepted online purchases in 2013, e-commerce reached US$4.5 billion in sales.

==== Tourism ====
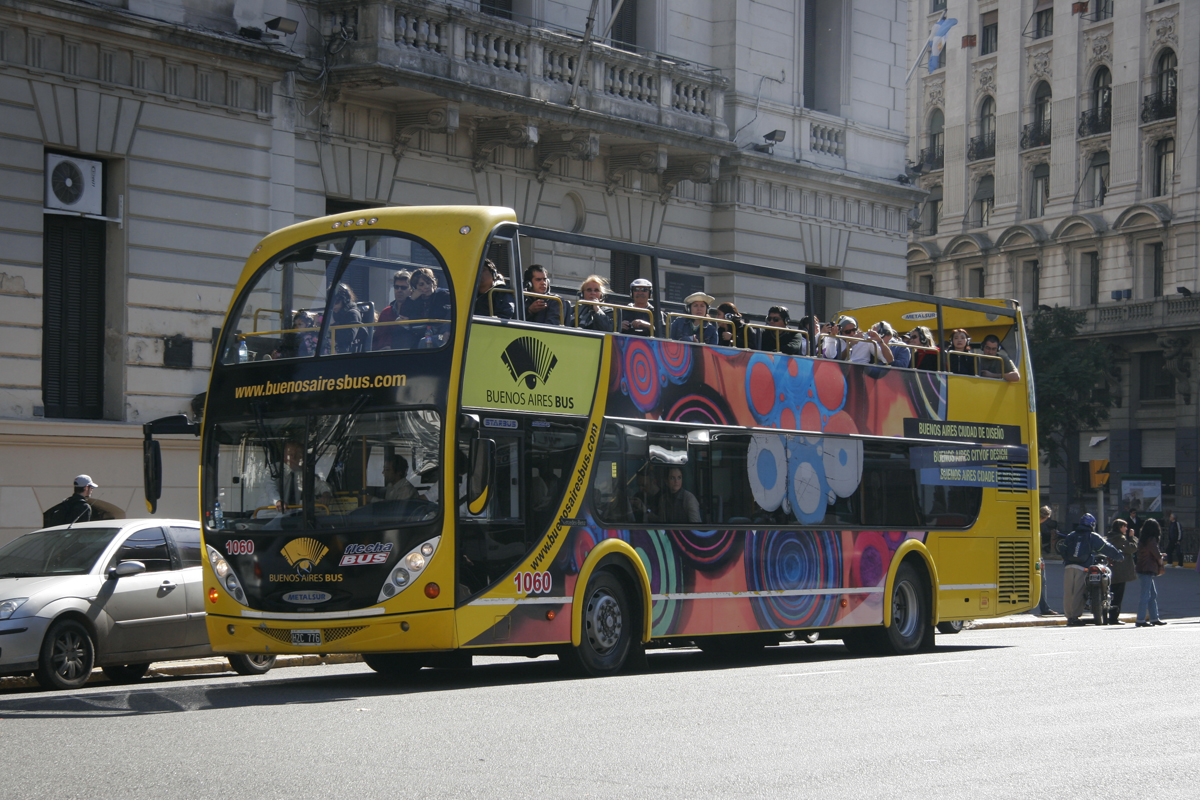
Tour bus in Buenos Aires

Tourism is an increasingly important sector, providing 4% of direct economic output (over US$17 billion) in 2012; around 70% of tourism sector activity by value is domestic. According to World Economic Forum's 2017 Travel & Tourism Competitiveness Report, tourism generated over US$22 billion, or 3.9% of GDP, and the industry employed more than 671,000 people, or approximately 3.7% of the workforce in 2016. Around 6.7 million foreign visitors arrived in 2017, reflecting a doubling in visitors since 2002 despite a relative appreciation of the peso.

Argentines have long been active travelers within Argentina and international tourism saw healthy growth (nearly doubling since 2001). Stagnant for over two decades, domestic travel increased strongly.

INDEC recorded 5.2 million foreign tourist arrivals and 6.7 million departures in 2013; of these, 32% arrived from Brazil, 19% from Europe, 10% from the United States and Canada, 10% from Chile, 24% from the rest of the Western Hemisphere, and 5% from the rest of the world. Around 48% of visitors arrived by commercial flight, 40% by motor travel (mainly from Brazil), and 12% by sea. Cruise liner arrivals were the fastest growing type of foreign tourism to Argentina; a of 160 liners carrying 510,000 passengers arrived at the Port of Buenos Aires in 2013, an eightfold increase in a just a decade.

== Infrastructure ==
=== Energy ===
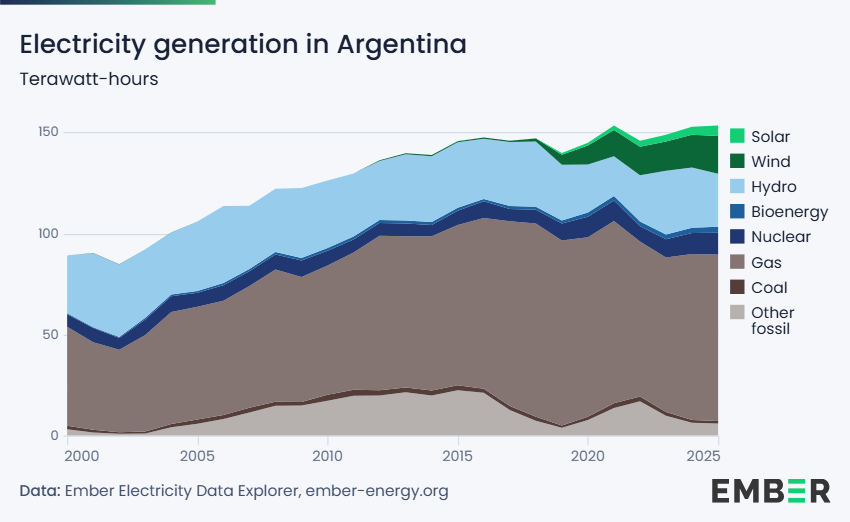
Electricity generation in Argentina in terawatt-hours

Argentine electricity generation reached 133.3 billion kWh in 2013. It was the third largest power market in Latin America. It mainly relies on centralised generation by natural gas (51%), hydroelectricity (28%), and oil (12%). Resource estimates of unconventional shale gas and tight oil in the Vaca Muerta oil field and elsewhere were estimated to be the world's third-largest. In 2017, Argentina was the 18th largest producer (and the largest producer in Latin America) of natural gas. In 2020, the country was the 28th largest oil producer at 70,000 m^{3} (440,300 bbl) per day.

Argentines outputed over 133 billion kWh of electricity in 2013, in large part through natural gas and hydroelectric resources. Nuclear energy is of high importance. The country is one of the largest producers and exporters, alongside Canada and Russia of cobalt-60, a radioactive isotope widely used in cancer therapy. At the end of 2021 Argentina was 21st in terms of installed hydroelectric power (11.3 GW), the 26th at wind energy (3.2 GW) and the 43rd in solar energy (1.0 GW).

The first of three nuclear reactors was inaugurated in 1974. As of 2015 nuclear power generated 5% of the country's energy output.

The electricity sector was unbundled in generation, transmission and distribution by early 1990s reforms. Generation is competitive and mostly liberalized; 75% of capacity is privately owned. In contrast, transmission and distribution is regulated with much less competitive.

=== Transportation ===
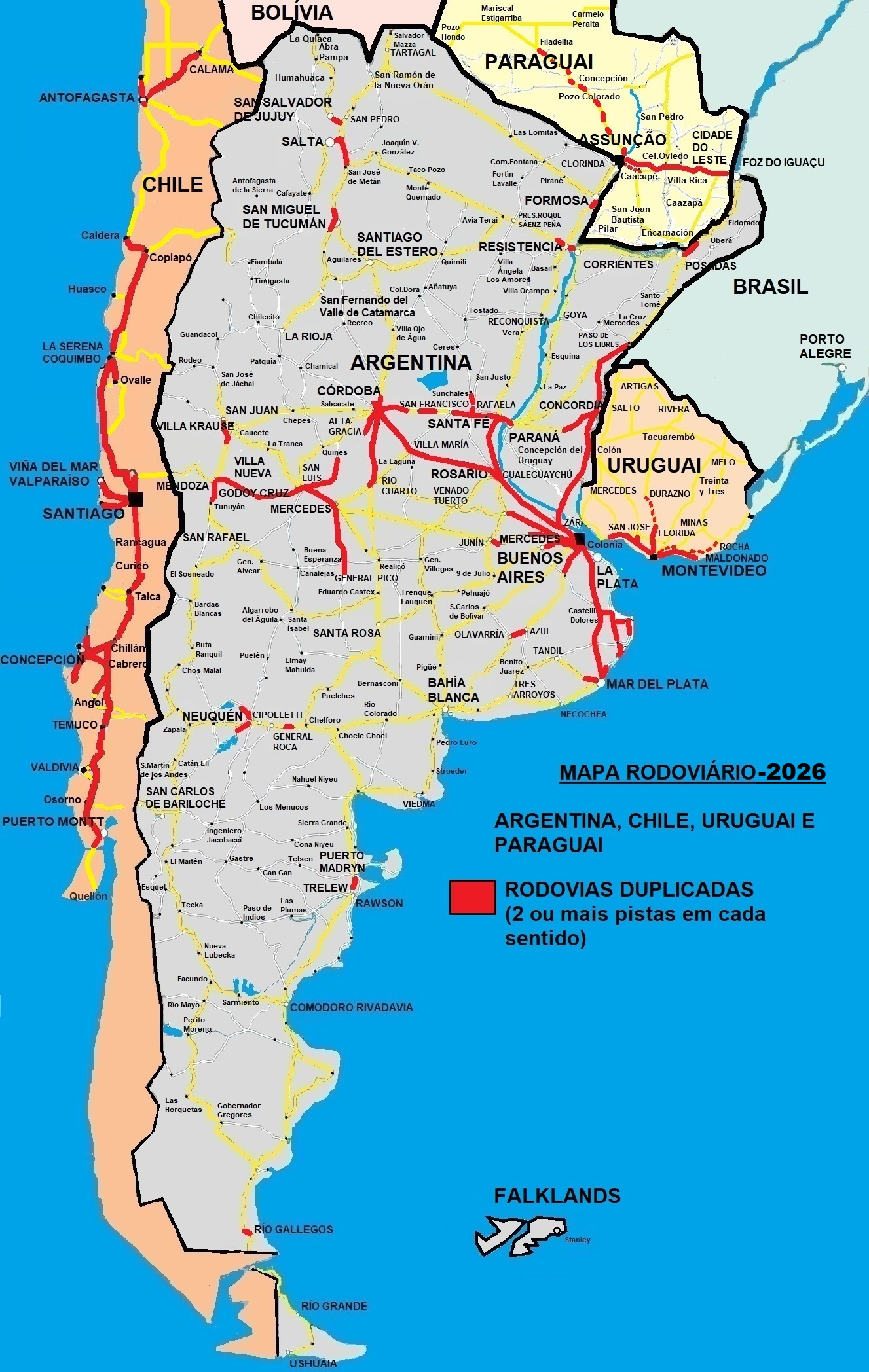
Road system in South America, with divided highways highlighted in red.

Transport in Argentina is mainly based on a complex network of routes, crossed by relatively inexpensive long-distance buses and by cargo trucks. The country also has a number of national and international airports. The importance of the long-distance train is minor today, though in the past it was widely used and is now regaining momentum after the re-nationalisation of the country's commuter and freight networks. Fluvial transport is mostly used for cargo.

Within the urban areas, the main transportation system is by the bus or colectivo; bus lines transport millions of people every day in the larger cities and their metropolitan areas as well as a bus rapid transport system known as Metrobus. Buenos Aires additionally has an underground, the only one in the country, and Greater Buenos Aires is serviced by a system of suburban trains.

=== Water supply and sanitation ===
Drinking water supply and sanitation in Argentina is characterized by relatively low tariffs, mostly reasonable service quality, low levels of metering and high levels of consumption for those with access to services. At the same time, according to the WHO, 21% of the total population remains without access to house connections and 52% of the urban population do not have access to sewerage. The responsibility for operating and maintaining water and sanitation services rests with 19 provincial water and sewer companies, more than 100 municipalities and more than 950 cooperatives, the latter operating primarily in small towns. Among the largest water and sewer companies are Agua y Saneamientos Argentinos (AYSA) and Aguas Bonarenses S.A. (ABSA), both operating in Greater Buenos Aires, Aguas Provinciales de Santa Fe, and Aguas Cordobesas SA, all of them now publicly owned. In 2008 there were still a few private concessions, such as Aguas de Salta SA, which is majority-owned by Argentine investors, and Obras Sanitarias de Mendoza (OSM).

Most service providers barely recover operation and maintenance costs and have no capacity to self-finance investments. While private operators were able to achieve higher levels of cost recovery, since the Argentine financial crisis in 2002 tariffs have been frozen and the self-financing capacity of utilities has disappeared. Roughly two-thirds of provincial water and sanitation spending since 2002 has come from general transfers from the federal government, the remainder coming from various national programs directed specifically to the sector.

Services are regulated by the 23 Provinces, in the case of 14 through regulatory agencies that have some limited autonomy from the government. Overall, however, responsibilities are not always clearly defined, and institutions are often weak, subject to political interference and lacking enforcement powers. The various national institutions with policy-setting responsibilities in the sector are not always well coordinated. There is no coherent national policy in terms of sector financing, subsidies, tariffs and service standards. The federal structure of the country and the dispersion of sector responsibilities between and within various levels of government make the development of a coherent sector policy all the more difficult.

Between 1991 and 1999, as part of one of the world's largest privatization programs covering a range of sectors, water and sanitation concessions with the private sector were signed covering 28% of the country's municipalities and 60% of the population. The highest profile concession was signed in 1993 with a consortium led by the French firm Suez for the central parts of Greater Buenos Aires. After the 2001 economic crisis, many concessions were renegotiated. Many were terminated, as it was the case in Buenos Aires in 2006.

The impact of private sector participation in water and sanitation is a controversial topic. While the public perception of the mostly international concessionaires is overwhelmingly negative in Argentina, some studies show positive impacts. For example, a 2002 study assessed the impact of privatization on child mortality based on household survey data, finding that child mortality fell 5 to 7 percent more in areas that privatized compared to those that remained under public or cooperative management. The authors estimate that the main reason is the massive expansion of access to water. According to Suez, the private concession in Buenos Aires extended access to water to 2 million people and access to sanitation to 1 million people, despite a freeze in tariffs imposed by the government in 2001 in violation of the concession agreement. The government argues that the concessionaire did not fully comply with its obligations concerning expansion and quality, saying that the supplied water had high levels of nitrate, pressure obligations were not kept and scheduled works were not carried out.

== GDP by value added ==
Supply sector (% of GDP in current prices)	1993–2001	2002–2005	2006–2009 (Note: New methodology; not strictly comparable to earlier data)	2010–2013
Agriculture, forestry, and fishing	5.4	10.3	7.3	7.3
Mining	2.0	5.9	4.8	4.2
Manufacturing	18.5	23.2	19.8	16.8
Public utilities	2.2	1.7	2.3	3.1
Construction	5.5	3.9	6.2	5.6
Commerce and tourism	17.3	14.0	15.6	14.4
Transport and communications	8.3	8.7	7.3	6.7
Financial services	4.2	4.4	3.2	3.4
Real estate and business services	16.5	11.7	13.7	12.9
Public administration and defense	6.3	5.4	5.6	7.4
Health and education	8.4	6.9	8.9	11.9
Personal and other services	5.4	3.9	5.3	6.3
Total	100.0	100.0	100.0	100.0

== Foreign trade ==
Exports of Argentina by product category (2019) Chemical products Transportation Machines Mineral products Plastics and rubbers Metals Foodstuffs Precious metals Textiles Instruments Animal products Vegetable products Paper goods Footwear and headwear Miscellaneous Stone and glass Wood products Animal and vegetable bi-products Animal hides Arts and antiques Weapons

In 2022, Argentina was the 44th largest exporter (by merchandise exports) totaling US$88 billion, or 0.4%.

Argentine exports are diversified. Agricultural raw materials are over 20% of the exports and agricultural goods account for over 50% of exports including processed foods. Soy products (soybeans, vegetable oil) accounted for almost one fourth. Cereals, mostly maize and wheat, which were Argentina's leading export during much of the twentieth century, make up less than one tenth now.

Industrial goods comprise over one-third of Argentine exports. Motor vehicles and auto parts are the leading industrial export, at over 12% of merchandise exports. Chemicals, steel, aluminum, machinery, and plastics account for most of the remaining industrial exports. Trade in manufactures has historically been in deficit for Argentina, however, and despite the nation's overall trade surplus, its manufacturing trade deficit exceeded US$30 billion in 2011. Accordingly, the system of non-automatic import licensing was extended in 2011, and regulations were enacted for the auto sector establishing a model by which a company's future imports would be determined by their exports.

A net energy importer until 1987, Argentina's fuel exports began increasing in the early 1990s and account for about one-eighth of the total; refined fuels make up about half of that. As of 2009 exports of crude petroleum and natural gas were around US$3 billion a year. Rapidly growing domestic energy demand and a gradual decline in oil production, resulted in a US$3 billion energy trade deficit in 2011 (the first in 17 years) and a US$6 billion energy deficit in 2013.

Argentine imports have historically been dominated by industrial and technological supplies, machinery, and parts, which have averaged US$50 billion since 2011 (two-thirds of imports). Consumer goods including motor vehicles make up most of the rest. Trade in services was in deficit. In 2013 this deficit widened to over US$4 billion with a record US$19 billion in service imports. The nation's chronic current account deficit was reversed during the 2002 crisis, and an average current account surplus of US$7 billion was logged between 2002 and 2009; this surplus later narrowed considerably, and was slightly negative in 2011.

=== Imports and exports ===
Year	Goods exports (billion US$)	Goods imports (in billion US$)	Net trade (in billion US$)
2023	▲$66.8	▲$69.8	▼−$2.9
2020	▼$55.0	▼$40.3	▲$14.6
2015	▼$56.8	▲$57.6	▼−$0.8
2010	▲$68.3	▲$54.2	▲$14.2
2000	▲$26.3	▲$23.9	▲$2.5
1990	▲$12.4	▲$3.7	▲$8.6
1980	$8.0	$9.4	▼−$1.4

=== Major trade partners ===
The following table shows the largest trading partners for Argentina in 2022 by trade value in billions of USD:

Country	Total trade value	Import value	Export value	Balance
Brazil	28.70	16.03	12.67	-3.36
China	25.53	17.51	8.02	-9.49
United States	17.01	10.33	6.68	-3.65
India	6.40	1.85	4.55	2.70
Chile	5.71	.778	4.94	4.16
Vietnamㅤㅤ	4.47	1.24	3.23	1.99
Netherlands	4.46	.886	3.57	2.68
Germany	3.60	2.72	.884	-1.83
Paraguay	3.28	1.96	1.32	-.635
Spain	2.99	1.26	1.73	.473

== Foreign investment ==
As of 2010 foreign direct investment (FDI) in Argentina was divided nearly evenly between manufacturing (36%), natural resources (34%), and services (30%). The chemical and plastics sector (10%) and the automotive sector (6%) led foreign investment in local manufacturing; oil and gas (22%) and mining (5%), in natural resources; telecommunications (6%), finance (5%), and retail trade (4%), in services. Spain was the leading source of foreign direct investment in Argentina, accounting for US$22 billion (28%) in 2009; the U.S. was second, with $13 billion (17%); China grew to become the third-largest by 2011. Investments from the Netherlands, Brazil, Chile, and Canada were significant; in 2012, foreign nationals held a of around US$112 billion in direct investment.

Bilateral agreements played an important role in promoting U.S. private investment. Argentina inked an Overseas Private Investment Corporation (OPIC) agreement and an active program with the U.S. Export-Import Bank. Under the 1994 U.S.–Argentina Bilateral Investment Treaty, U.S. investors enjoyed national treatment in all sectors except shipbuilding, fishing, nuclear-power generation, and uranium production. The treaty allowed for international arbitration of investment disputes.

FDI averaged US$5.7 billion from 1992 to 1998 and reached in US$24 billion in 1999 (reflecting the purchase of 98% of YPF stock by Repsol), fell to US$1.6 billion in 2003. FDI then accelerated, reaching US$8 billion in 2008. The financial crisis cut this figure to US$4 billion in 2009; but inflows recovered to US$8.7 billion in 2011

FDI volume remained below the regional average as a percent of GDP; Kirchner Administration policies and difficulty in enforcing contractual obligations were blamed. Foreign investment in Argentina shifted after 2000, from privatizations and mergers and acquisitions, to over half in the form of medium and high-tech investment (compared to 36% in Brazil and 3% in Chile).

== Issues ==
The Fernández government has been accused of manipulating economic statistics.

=== Reliability of official CPI estimates ===
Official CPI inflation figures released monthly by INDEC were a subject of political controversy from 2007 through 2015. Official inflation data were disregarded by leading union leaders, when negotiating pay rises. Some private-sector estimates put inflation for 2010 at around 25%, much higher than the official 10.9% rate. Inflation estimates from Argentina's provinces were higher than government figures. The government backed up the validity of its data, but called in the IMF to help design a new nationwide index.

The official CPI assessed 520 products, however the list was not made public. Economic analysts were prosecuted for publishing estimates that disagreed with official statistics. The government levied a fine of up to 500,000 pesos for providing what it called "fraudulent inflation figures". Beginning in 2015, the government again called for competitive bids from the private sector to provide a weekly independent inflation index.

=== Inflation ===
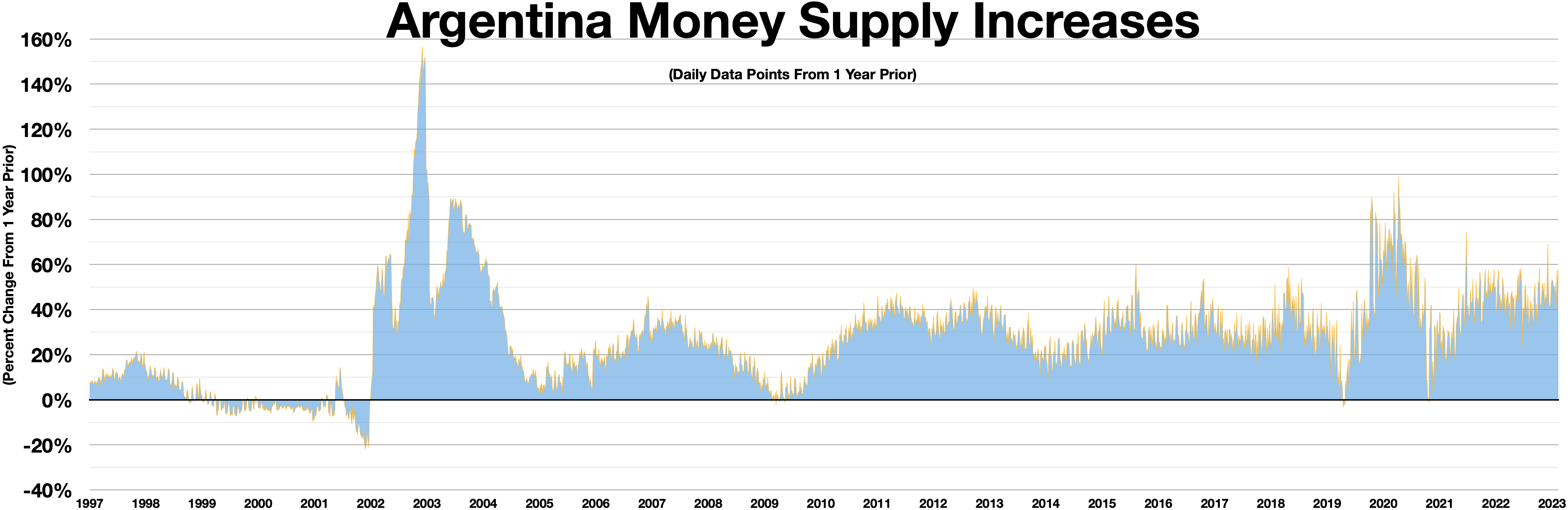
Argentina money supply increases year over year. Daily data points.

High inflation was a weakness of the Argentine economy for decades, frequently above 25%, although it dramatically declined under Milei, reaching 1.5% in June 2025.

The inflation rate in Argentina rose to 52.3 percent in February 2022. In August the interest rate was hiked to 69.5% as inflation further deteriorated, hitting a 20-year high at 70%. Inflation passed 100% in February 2023, for the first time since 1991. On October 12 2023, Argentina's central bank again increased the benchmark interest rate from 118% to 133%, as inflation hit 138%.

Argentine workers held funerals to mourn the "death of (their) wages".

After Milei's victory in October 2023, efforts were made to curb the inflation rate. In January 2022, the monthly inflation rate kept increasing from 2.4% to a peak of 25% just before his inauguration. Soon after, Milei devalued the peso by 50% to cut the wide gap between the official exchange rate and the market exchange rate. In a year he brought inflation down to a monthly 2.4%. Milei then arranged a 2% monthly devaluation.

In 2024, the peso appreciated by 44.2% against the dollar, outperforming all other currencies. These actions aimed to stabilize an economy teetering on the brink of hyperinflation. The peso's strengthening doubled average wages in dollar terms to $990.

=== Income distribution ===
In relation to other Latin American countries, Argentina has a moderate to low level of income inequality. Its Gini coefficient was about 0.407 (2022). The gap was worst in the capital suburbs, where the economically successful live in gated communities, while the poor live in slums known as villas miserias.

In the mid-1970s, the most affluent 10% of Argentina's population had an income 12 times that of the poorest 10%. That figure grew to 18 times by the mid-1990s, and by 2002, 43, before declining to 16 in 2010.

Argentina had an inequality-adjusted human development index of 0.729, compared to 0.578 and 0.709 for neighboring Brazil and Chile, respectively. The 2010 Census found that poverty still affected 1 in 8 inhabitants, however; and while the official, household survey poverty rate (based on U$S 100 per person per month, net) was 4.7% in 2013, although the National Research Council estimated poverty in 2010 at 22.6%, with private consulting firms estimating that in 2011 around 21% fell below the income poverty line. The World Bank estimated that, in 2013, 3.6% subsisted on less than US$3.10 per person per day.

=== Informal Employment ===
As with many other Latin American countries, Argentina suffers from high levels of informal employment. As of January 2025, it is estimated that 42% of workers in Argentina were affected by informal unemployment. The consequences of this are variable and widespread. An obvious issue is the government's inability to collect taxes on informal firms and workers. But the government is not the only group who is disadvantaged by informal work. Informal workers, on average, earn nearly 60% less than formal workers and are half as likely to benefit from social protection benefits.

== See also ==
- List of companies of Argentina
- List of Argentines by net worth
- List of Argentine provinces by gross regional product
- Comparison between Argentine provinces and countries by GDP (PPP) per capita
- Corruption in Argentina
- Buenos Aires Stock Exchange
- Taxation in Argentina
- Trade unions in Argentina
- Argentina and the International Monetary Fund
- Argentina and the World Bank
- Economic history of Argentina
- Science and technology in Argentina
- History of agriculture in Argentina
- Bank of the South
- Mercosur
- Railway nationalisation in Argentina
- Railway privatisation in Argentina
- Water privatization in Argentina
- Economic history of Latin America
- Latin American debt crisis
- Wealth inequality in Latin America
- List of Latin American and Caribbean countries by GDP growth
- List of Latin American and Caribbean countries by GDP (nominal)
- List of Latin American and Caribbean countries by GDP (PPP)
