= Poverty in South America =

Poverty in South America is prevalent in most of its countries. Those that have the highest rates of poverty per population are Suriname, Bolivia and Venezuela. Recent political shifts in the region have led to improvements in some of these countries. In general, most South American economies have attempted to tackle poverty with stronger economic regulations, foreign direct investments and implementation of microeconomic policies to reduce poverty.

== Conditions by nation ==
=== Argentina ===
Argentina is one of two countries that has seen an upward shift in its poverty population in 2017. Its poverty population was recorded at 27.5% and 32% in 2018. Critics of the official INDEC survey charge that both the inflation rate used to measure poverty and the official baseline household budgets themselves are understated. The official income poverty line also increased 150% between 2001 and early 2010; but most private surveys of household conditions in Argentina estimate it at half again as much as the official threshold, and the effective poverty rate at around 25% of the population. Absolute poverty estimates, as measured by the inability to meet a minimum nutritional budget, also differ: this condition includes 3.5% of the population officially, and around 10% per private estimates.

Poverty in Argentina varies widely according to region, and provinces in the north have historically shouldered the nation's highest poverty rates. Estimates of income poverty in this region ranged from around 20% officially, to over 40% in private estimates; substandard living conditions affected around 30% of this region's population in the 2001 Census. The city of Buenos Aires proper, Santa Cruz and Tierra del Fuego Provinces benefit from the nation's lowest poverty rates (around 7 to 14%, depending on the measurement). The majority of Argentina's public social programs, aside from those related to health, are administered by the National Social Security Administration (ANSES). Argentines in the labor force earning less than 4,800 pesos (US$1,230) monthly, are entitled to benefits upon marriage, birth or adoption of a child, for maternity leave or prenatal care, and for a disability in a child, as well as to a modest unemployment insurance benefit for up to 6 months. The most important poverty relief program administered by the ANSES is the Universal Childhood Entitlement. The benefit, of 180 pesos (US$46) a month per child, is assigned to 3.7 million children under age 18 (30% of the nation's total), and includes the deposit of 20% of the check in a savings account accessible only upon certification of the child's enrollment in school.

The health needs of the poor in Argentina (and of a sizable proportion of the working class) is attended to by the public hospital system, which received funding of around US$8 billion in 2009, and whose quality of care typically falls short of the systems relied on by the nation's middle and upper classes (health cooperatives and private health insurance); health care for poor (and most non-poor) senior citizens is overseen by PAMI. The National Housing Fund (FONAVI) and its successors, the Provincial Housing Institutes, have also benefited the poor by facilitating access to affordable housing, and since 1976, has completed over a million housing units. The socio-economic crisis at the time prompted the enactment of the Program for Unemployed Heads of Households in early 2002, and at its height in 2003, around 2 million beneficiaries received debit cards worth 150 pesos (US$50) for part-time work; by 2010, the plan's impact on employment had become negligible.

Birth control among the poor, especially access to contraceptives, has long been discouraged by a succession of Argentine governments. Government policy instead rewards large families with subsidies that rise disproportionately with the seventh child, Argentine women have long had among Latin America's lowest birth rates (averaging 2.3 births per woman in recent years).

Poverty in Argentina increased dramatically in 2024 as Javier Milei deregulated large parts of the Argentinian economy, removing price controls, subsidies, and cutting tens of thousands of government jobs in an attempt to stabilize the Argentine peso. This has led to a surge in poverty, with poverty rates reaching a all time high of 57.4% in February, 2024 and being 51.8% in April 2024. Food inflation was particularity hard hit, with most soup kitchens being unable to maintain adequate supply. According to UNICEF Argentina's child poverty was on track to reach 70% with growing austerity, Argentina's economy is set to shrink by 2.5% in 2024.

=== Bolivia ===
Comparative Trends in Poverty and Basic Service Access by Department
	Poverty (NBI)			Lack of Water Access			Lack of Sanitation Access		
Department	2012	2024	Change	2001	2024	Change	2001	2024	Change
Beni	▼ -13%	▼ -14%	▼ -22%						
Chuquisaca	▼ -17%	▼ -29%	▼ -26%						
Cochabamba	▼ -16%	▼ -12%	▼ -14%						
La Paz	▼ -15%	▼ -14%	▼ -22%						
Oruro	▼ -14%	▼ -16%	▼ -24%						
Pando	▼ -18%	▼ -20%	▼ -26%						
Potosí	▼ -15%	▼ -23%	▼ -21%						
Santa Cruz	▼ -15%	▼ -9%	▼ -29%						
Tarija	▼ -13%	▼ -12%	▼ -22%						
Bolivia	▼ -15%	▼ -14%	▼ -22%						
NBI indicates a Unsatisfied Basic Needs definition for poverty. Source: INE Bolivia, 2024 Bolivian Census

Bolivia was one of the poorest countries in South America, but between 2006 and 2014, GDP per capita doubled and the extreme poverty rate declined from 38 to 18%. This represents a great improvement in comparison to the situation by 2005, diminishing poverty from 59.6% to 38.6% in a decade. These changes are mainly attributed to the socialist government of Evo Morales, who came to power in 2005. This government introduced a number of measures to combat poverty:

- The Bono Juancito Pinto gives school children grants of approximately US$29 (200 bolivianos) a year as an incentive to continue education to the 6th grade of primary school. It was introduced in 2006.
- The Renta Dignidad was introduced in 2008 to prevent extreme poverty amongst the elderly. It gives all citizens over 60 a grant of US$258 (1800 bolivianos) or $344 (2400 bolivianos) to those not receiving social security payments.
- The Bono Juana Azurduy provides new mothers with small financial incentives to seek pre and post natal medical care with the aim of reducing child mortality rates. It began in May 2009.

=== Brazil ===
Brazil is the largest country in South America and has a low to moderate poverty rate. Poverty in Brazil is concentrated in the north-eastern region of the country, with 60% of the country's poorest. The majority of those in poverty are of Afro-Brazilian heritage. Over 8.9 million Brazilians live on less than $2 a day.

After the macroeconomic stabilization in the second half of the 1990s, different Brazilian administrations have increasingly addressed the issue of poverty. The Fome Zero (Zero Hunger) and Brasil Sem Miséria (Brazil Without Poverty) programmes have lifted hundreds of thousands of people out of poverty. The former served as an umbrella programme for multiple conditional cash transfer initiative Bolsa Família. All three programmes were established under the Partido dos Trabalhadores (Workers' Party) governments. The latter was instrumental in achieving the Millennium Development Goal (MDGs) of reducing extreme poverty in Brazil, with Brazil surpassing the target. The poverty headcount in 2012 stood at 9%, down from 21% in 2005 and 34% in 1996. The rate of extreme poverty was 3.6% in 2012 compared to 13.4% in 1990. In 2014 Brazil managed to exit FAO's world map of malnutrition.

=== Colombia ===
Colombia has the 4th largest economy in Latin America, tourism booms, and consistent GDP growth. In recent years, the government has instituted new micro-economic regulations that have led to poverty reduction by increasing and supporting new opportunities to improve the lives of rural populations. This has helped Colombia shift from moderate to high levels of poverty to low to moderate levels of rural poverty. Their poverty reduction strategy focuses on three components: rural development, social and infrastructural services and decentralization. This country feels that if they put their main focus on these particular issues it has a good chance at dramatically reducing its rural-area poverty.

=== Ecuador ===
As of 2023, approximately 27% of the population of Ecuador was living below the national poverty line, with 10.8% living in extreme poverty. Poverty in rural areas is particularly high at about 46.4%. The multidimensional poverty rate was recorded at 38.1% in 2022 but in rural areas it was as high as 70.1% compared with 23.2% in urban areas. The rate of chronic malnutrition among children under 2 years of age stood at about 20.1% in 2023. Healthcare is provided by the state, contributing to reductions in child mortality rates and helping to address malnutrition.

=== Paraguay ===
23.8% of the population is below the poverty line and 4% is very poor, per national surveys; the proportion of Paraguayans living in absolute poverty was 10.3%, as measured in the UN Human Development Index. The problems associated with poverty that this country deals with is migration, language and that there is no standard welfare system. Water and sanitation conditions are also inefficient in rural areas, where the majority of the poor population is concentrated, which leads to the poor getting sick from the unsanitary way of living.

=== Peru ===
From 2000 to 2018, Peru's poverty rates dropped from 54.7% to 20.5%. The country's total poverty is 20.5%.

According to the World Bank, Peru has recently made great advances in development. It has been successful with "high growth rates, low inflation, macroeconomic stability, reduction of external debt and poverty and significant advances in social and development indicators". However, 1.4% of Peru's urban population lives below the poverty line, while the rural population sits at 19.7%. Reductions of inequality have occurred in Peru, but inequality is still high, with a GINI Index of 0.45.

This country suffers from low income jobs, poor teaching skills in the rural areas, as well as absence of full benefits for the primary health care and chronic problems that the country has. The poor people in rural areas are at greater risks for health illness because they lack access to clean water and sanitation.

The population has grown, and this is causing more poverty because the country's cities are becoming over crowded. Over the last few years Peru is showing a little improvement with the social welfare system and the consumption poverty rates. The social welfare system is reaching more out to the poor because the government is receiving more funding. The consumption poverty rates are slightly lower from 19% to 15%, but there are still millions of Peruvians suffering from severe poverty.

=== Uruguay ===
By 2022, 9.1% of the population remains under the poverty line. Due to this, it is one of the South American countries with the lowest poverty rate.

Income poverty in Uruguay, historically low by regional standards, had increased substantially during that country's struggle with chronic stagflation from the 1960s until the mid-1980s; from 1986 to 1999, however, income poverty declined sharply, from 46% to 15%. Fallout from an earlier financial crisis in neighboring Argentina helped lead to a resurgence in poverty, to 27%, by 2006, though by 2008, a reduction of the rate to around 24% was measured, while 2.2% of the population remained in absolute poverty; as in many other nations, the poor in Uruguay suffer from far higher rates of unemployment than the population at large (27%, compared to an average of 7.5%). The rate of absolute poverty in Uruguay, measured as part of the UN Human Development Index, was 3.0% in 2009, and was the lowest in Latin America.

=== Venezuela ===
As of 2011, recent income official statistics show that the total poverty rate in the country stands at 31.9%. Of this group, 23.3% corresponds to relative poverty and 8.6% corresponds to absolute poverty.

A United Nations report estimated in March 2019 that 94% of Venezuelans lived in poverty.

By 2021, 94.5% of the population was living in poverty based on income according to the national Living Conditions Survey (ENCOVI), out of which 76.6% lived under extreme poverty, the highest figure ever recorded in the country.

== See also ==
- List of countries by percentage of population living in poverty
