= Argentina and the World Bank =

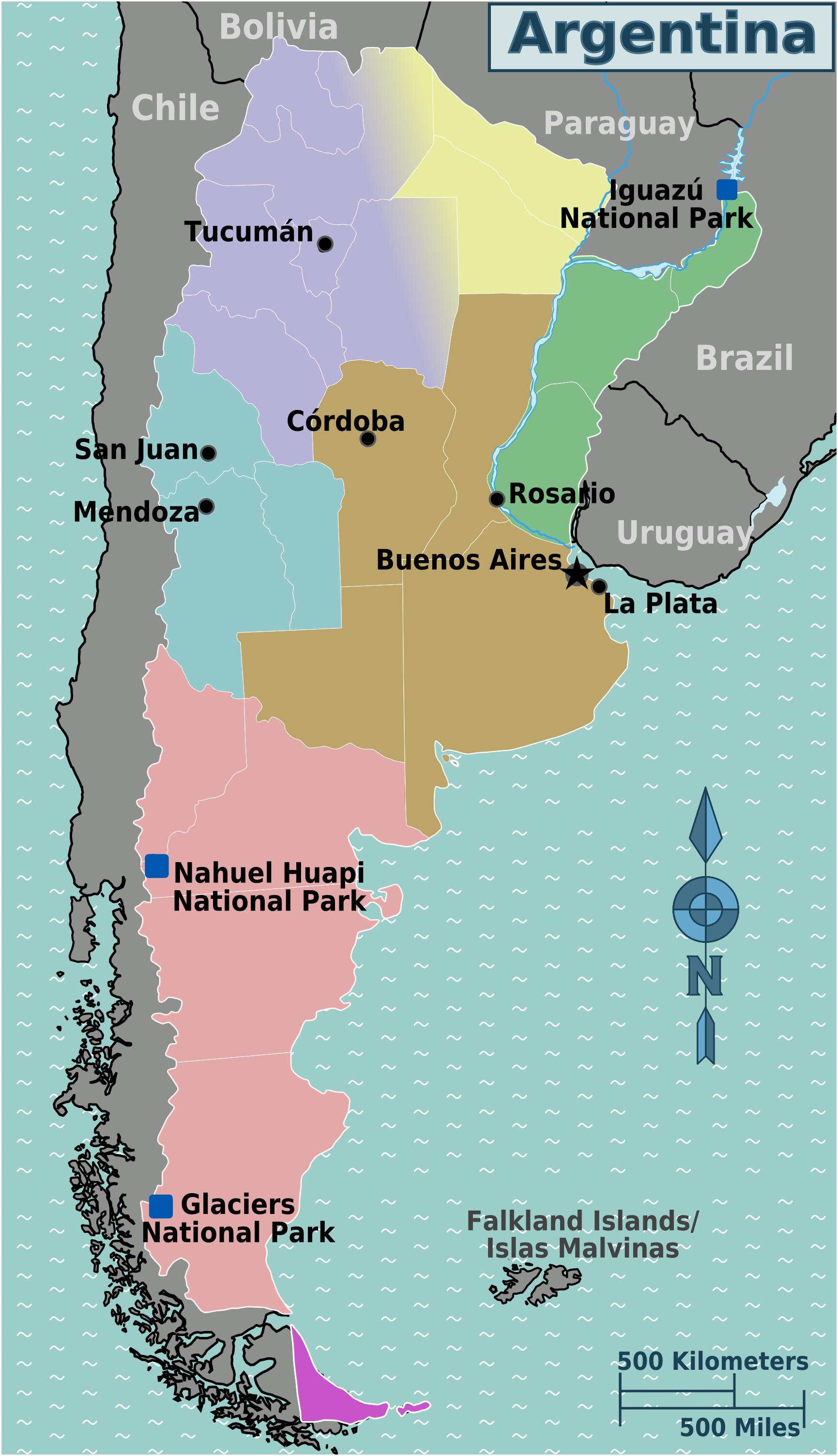
Map of Argentina

Argentina has a longstanding relationship with the World Bank. Argentina has one of the biggest economies in Latin America and is rich in natural resources, which could play a large part in its future economic development.

== World Bank ==
The World Bank is an international financial organisation. Its primary purpose is to offer loans to countries for capital projects.

== Argentina ==
Argentina is an affluent country, but it also has high levels of poverty. From 2004 to 2008, Argentina reduced poverty levels by promoting economic growth. Average income grew at a rate of 7.6%. The lowest 40% of incomes rose by 4.2% during this period. After 2008, income growth slowed down.

In 2019 Argentina's economic freedom score was 52.2, ranking 148th globally. Its overall score decreased by 0.1 points, with plunging scores for fiscal health and government spending, outweighing improvements in monetary freedom and property rights. Argentina ranked 26th among 32 countries in the Americas region, and its overall score remained below the regional and world average.

Since the 2015 presidential election, Argentina's economic policies prioritized unification of the exchange rate, reaching an agreement with international creditors, modernizing import policies, reducing inflation and reforming the national statistics system. Experts claimed these reforms would lower external tariffs, increase GDP and increase trade.

In April 2017, after a long period of financial distress, President Mauricio Macri declared that "Argentina is in the middle of a cultural change" and that "Argentina is back in the world. Argentina wants to play a significant role in the global scenario." Argentina did increase its international trade. Argentina is a member of the G20. The country is looking into the OECD to become an observer in the Pacific Alliance.

At the beginning of 2019, economic growth slowed, producing forecasts of a recession. In April 2018, the Argentine peso depreciated with its value decreasing by 50% against the dollar. This caused inflation to skyrocket in June. Notwithstanding an ongoing crisis of confidence in the economy, President Macri is sticking with his government's politically risky austerity plan of budget cuts and tax increases to close the fiscal gap.

== History ==
The World Bank has helped Argentina on multiple occasions. It offered new loans after the economic downturn of 2017.

Argentina became a member country of the world Bank group in 1956, 10 years after the inception of the banking group. The country's first projects began 5 years later in 1961, focusing primarily on infrastructure development projects. Between 1961 and 1979, all projects funded by the World Bank to Argentina focused on developing the nation's roads, highways, and agricultural production. In the 1980s, the World Bank began to diversify its projects in Argentina, funding industrial credit program, coal and oil refineries, banking loans and public sector development credits.

In the 1990s, the World Bank expanded its global mission to include programs aimed at good governance (which it measures with six indicators). It asserted that governance is "the manner in which power is exercised in the management of a country's economic and social resources for development". In 1983, Argentina underwent a regime change from a military dictatorship to a democracy after the election of Raul Alfonsin, and experienced issues with corruption and mismanagement throughout the 1980s and 1990s. The World Bank expanded projects in Argentina over the 1990s to include judicial reform, tax reform, and general public sector reform in efforts to improve Argentina's good governance indicators.

World Bank Logo

In 2017, the President of the World Bank, Jim Yong Kim met with Argentinian officials in Buenos Aires. During his visit, Kim made a public speech focused on trade opportunities, knowledge sharing and cutting-edge technology. Kim announced that the World Bank's two billion dollar investment in Argentina would be in sectors such as renewable energy, human development, agriculture, infrastructure, and in poverty reduction.

The World Bank announced in November 2018 that the first 500 million dollars of the investment would target the overall finances of Argentina. Another $450 million would go to the Children and Youth Protection Program. According to the agreement, the 32.5 year work period would be extended an additional 7.5 years if the projects do not achieve results.

As of 2019, The World Bank group has committed US$7.7 billion to 26 active projects. The World Bank states that its investment goals in Argentina are developing health, environment, education, infrastructure, labor market and social protection. Beginning in the 1980s, Argentina has been one of the largest recipients of World Bank financial support, generally falling in the top 10 credit receiving countries.

== International Finance Corporation ==
The International Finance Corporation (IFC) is an organization within the World Bank that specializes in investment, advisory, and asset management services and aims to promote private-sector development in developing countries. Since 2000 the IFC has partnered with the Pan American Energy group, the second largest gas and oil organization in Argentina.

IFC provided a $55 million loan to Banco Industrial in Argentina to give more to small and medium enterprises (SMEs). Located in Buenos Aires Banco Industrial is a private bank that focuses on short-term and well-coordinated financial products. IFC promotes the idea that smaller businesses will create jobs and drive financial growth. SMEs are one mode of Argentina economic development, which Banco Industrial has focused on as a basis for digital banking.
