= List of Argentines by net worth =

This is a list of Argentine billionaires based on an annual assessment of wealth and assets compiled and published by Forbes magazine in 2023.

== 2023 Argentine billionaires list ==
World Rank	Image	Name	Net worth (USD)	Source of wealth
552		Marcos Galperin	4.9 billion	MercadoLibre
1027		Gregorio Pérez Companc	2.9 billion	oil & gas
1575		Eduardo Eurnekian	1.9 billion	airports, investments
1647		Alejandro Bulgheroni	1.8 billion	Bridas Corporation
2133		Eduardo Constantini	1.3 billion	real estate

== See also ==
- The World's Billionaires
- List of countries by number of billionaires
