= Comparison between Argentine provinces and countries by GDP (PPP) per capita =

This is a comparison between Argentine provinces and countries by gross domestic product (PPP) per capita. All data is for the year 2008.

These figures are based on the IADER list on List of Argentine provinces by GDP (nominal) per capita for Argentine provinces, and the List of countries by GDP (PPP) per capita for world GDP per capita and based on International Monetary Fund data.

| Rank | Country and (Argentine provinces) | Intl. $ |
|---|---|---|
| 1 | Santa Cruz | 26,438 |
| 2 | Tierra del Fuego | 25,993 |
| 3 | Neuquén | 23,380 |
| 4 | Chubut | 22,983 |
| 5 | Buenos Aires City | 20,036 |
| 6 | Río Negro | 15,046 |
| 7 | Buenos Aires | 14,773 |
| 8 | San Luis | 14,649 |
| — | Argentina | 14,408 |
| 9 | Santa Fe | 14,216 |
| 10 | San Juan | 14,154 |
| 11 | Catamarca | 14,105 |
| 12 | Mendoza | 13,795 |
| 13 | Córdoba | 13,708 |
| 14 | La Pampa | 13,658 |
| 15 | Jujuy | 13,089 |
| 16 | Salta | 12,594 |
| 17 | Santiago del Estero | 12,532 |
| 18 | Entre Ríos | 12,420 |
| 19 | Corrientes | 12,148 |
| 20 | Misiones | 12,099 |
| 21 | Formosa | 11,616 |
| 22 | Chaco | 11,516 |
| 23 | Tucuman | 10,811 |
| 24 | La Rioja | 10,414 |

== See also ==
- List of Argentine provinces by GDP (nominal) per capita - GDP per capita PPP (not nominal)
- List of countries by GDP (nominal) per capita
- List of countries by GDP (real) growth rate per capita
- List of countries by future GDP per capita estimates (PPP)
- List of regions by past GDP (PPP) per capita
- List of countries by average wages
