= Economic reforms of Javier Milei =

Javier Milei
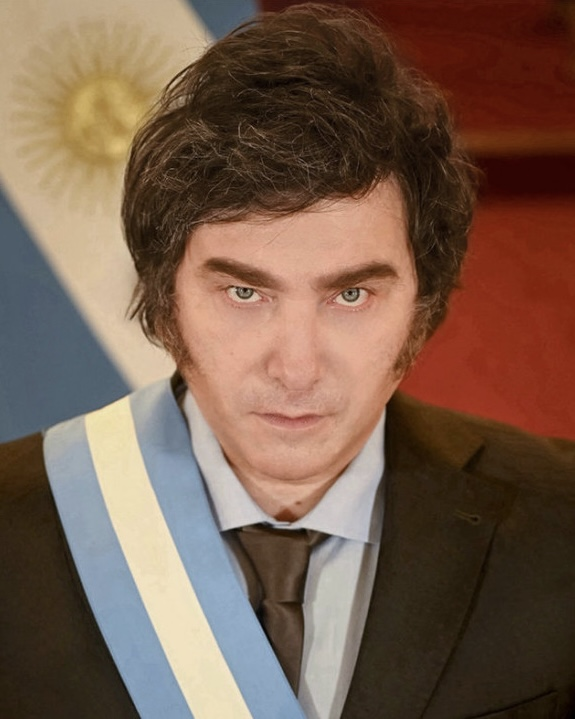
- Official portrait, 2024

After winning the Argentinian presidential elections of 2023, Javier Milei took office and began to conduct the most extensive liberalising reforms in the history of Argentina since the 1990s. His administration drastically reduced economic regulations and controls, subsidies, and government employment and spending, in turn greatly reducing the government's budget deficit and price inflation. Economic growth as well as public confidence in the economy and the government also increased significantly during this time. The poverty rate peaked and began to decline significantly, although household budgets remained strained (including by the loss of some government benefits) and confidence in the job market stayed generally poor.

== Background ==
In late 2019, then President Mauricio Macri reinstated exchange controls previously abolished earlier in his term to curb increasing inflation. In June 2020, the Peronist government introduced strict rent controls. Although this maintained prices somewhat stable in the short term, rents surged two years later as the supply of rental housing faltered. By September 2023 the supply of rental homes had reduced by 80% when compared to 2015. In 2021, the government implemented capital controls and tightened the currency, leading to two diverging exchange rates: the official and the parallel exchange rate. The official exchange rate is a government-controlled rate often used in official economic measures and statistics, while the parallel exchange rate reflects the true value of the currency, often significantly differing due to government restrictions or economic instability.

By 2023, official poverty stood at 41.7%, but independent estimates placed it closer to 49.5%.

Informal work has long been a structural problem in Argentina. These workers are not registered with social security and therefore not covered by labour legislation or institutions, healthcare, job protections and health insurance. Extensive labour regulations and protections, as well as a high tax burden raise the cost of hiring workers and make formal hiring risky. This results in firms hiring informally to save on taxes and compliance costs. Informal work undermines productivity and income growth because informal firms are smaller, less productive, and less likely to invest in technology or training. In 2005, informal employment represented ~55% of the total workforce. In 2025 this figure decreased modestly to 42%.

Inflation had risen from 2.4% per month in 2022 to a peak of 25% per month in December 2023, propelling the nation into hyperinflation. This hyperinflation eroded the purchasing power of the Argentine peso, rendering wages insufficient to meet basic living expenses. Wages, along with purchasing power in Argentina began falling in October 2023, before Milei was elected and inaugurated as president. By the start of his presidency, real wages fell by more than 20%. Over the last 123 years, Argentina has recorded a budget deficit in 113 of them. The resultant economic instability eroded public trust in the government's ability to manage the economy, prompting widespread protests and calls for urgent reform. The situation reached a tipping point, setting the stage for Milei's election and his subsequent implementation of radical economic reforms aimed at reversing the country's economic decline. Lucas Romero, the head of Synopsis, a local political consulting firm and Andrei Roman, CEO of Brazil-based pollster Atlas Intel believe that Javier Milei's victory in the 2023 elections was not necessarily a result of popular approval of his ideas but rather stemmed from widespread dissatisfaction with the political establishment, which had been strongly left-wing in its economic approach. The people thus wanted change.

According to the UFM, Milei inherited a repressive tax system with a tax burden of more than 30% to GDP, and a 60% public debt to GDP.

== Milei's decisions ==
=== 2024 ===
During his campaign and throughout his presidency, Javier Milei has said several times that the reforms he plans to enact are "painful", but "necessary", contending that it's the only way. "There is no alternative to a shock adjustment,” Milei said during his inauguration. “There is no money.” In his first year as Argentina's president (since December 2023), Javier Milei prioritized inflation reduction as the overriding goal of his economic agenda; all other policies were subordinated to this urgent mission. 2 days after being inaugurated, he cut the number of ministry and secretariat positions by 50%, and public officials by 34%.

During Milei's presidency, his reforms and bills have been repeatedly contested by the established parties in the Argentine congress due to Milei's party being in the minority. The peronist opposition parties in particular rallied heavily against his bills, as Milei's proposed policies were antithetical to their beliefs of equality. In June 2024, Milei was able to pass his tax and 'omnibus' bill. The bill, aimed at deregulating and reforming several sectors and state owned enterprises in Argentina, also included reforms concerning labour, commerce and real estate and various social programmes such as healthcare. Months of backlash led towards the number of articles reducing from over 600 to 232. During the vote and deliberations, some articles, such as the privatization of the state owned airlines were also rejected. Eventually, following an 11-hour debate and after a 36–36 tie, Vice President Victoria Villarruel, the head of the chamber, cast the decisive vote.

In October 2024, Milei shut down AFIP, the Argentine tax agency. According to Bloomberg Línea, 80 percent of AFIP's 2024 budget was allocated for salary payments. Milei achieved a budget surplus within the first few months in office by substantially downsizing government structure, reducing government spending by 30% by the end of the year. This led to 9.6% of all federal employees (approximately 52,000) being laid off, saving the government approximately 2.1 billion. The ministry of infrastructure, secretariat of science & technology, and the secretariat of education in particular saw most or almost all of their funding disappear, along with major cuts to the pension fund, where the Argentine pensioner of the lowest income bracket only receiving 320 dollars a month, slightly more than a third of what the average household needs to survive. The funding for the office of the Presidency was also cut by 13.3%, whilst the Argentine intelligence agency saw a 215.9% increase in their budget. The reforms have contributed towards macroeconomic stability but were accompanied by social unrest. At the end of the year, real wage growth had outpaced inflation for the first time in 4 years.

Javier Milei's economic stabilization plan, launched upon his inauguration in December 2023, sought to resolve Argentina's chronic inflation, fiscal deficits, and dual exchange rate distortions through a phased program of monetary and fiscal tightening. It introduced a hybrid exchange regime with maintaining an official rate for key transactions while allowing a market-determined rate to operate with the end goal to unify the two exchange rates gradually. The strategy combined strict control of the money supply, high interest rates, and credit restrictions with sustained fiscal consolidation via spending cuts and subsidy reform. Among Milei's first actions was a 50 percent peso devaluation to narrow the gap between official and parallel rates, followed by a policy of gradual 2 percent monthly devaluation to stabilize the currency and rebuild investor confidence. The goal was to stabilize the economy, restore purchasing power, and enable sustainable growth while reducing the social and economic harm caused by past cycles of inflation and currency problems.

President Javier Milei's government moved to dismantle Argentina's decade-long capital and currency controls, known as the cepo, which had restricted access to foreign exchange and deterred investment. Enabled by a $20 billion IMF bailout with $12 billion disbursed immediately. The reform replaced the fixed currency peg with a managed-float system, allowing the peso to trade within a band of 1,000–1,400 per U.S. dollar. The measures also lifted limits on dollar purchases and permitted firms to repatriate profits. Economists regarded the policy as a major step toward market normalization and macroeconomic stabilization, while warning that its success would depend on sustained investor confidence and the management of austerity's social impact.

=== 2025 ===
In 2025, the administration of Javier Milei continued his economic reform programme. An element of Milei's 2025 reforms was Argentina's engagement with international financial institutions. In April, the government reached a US$20 billion Extended Fund Facility agreement with the International Monetary Fund, designed to support the country's fiscal consolidation and structural reform programme. This arrangement stipulated the maintenance of fiscal anchors, progress toward greater exchange‑rate flexibility, and commitments to liberalize the capital account. Under the programme, many of Argentina's longstanding foreign‑exchange controls were relaxed, enabling firms to repatriate profits, conduct foreign trade transactions more freely, and access FX markets without the restrictive limitations that had previously characterized the system. The government progressively dismantled the dual or multiple exchange-rate regime, replacing it with a unified and gradually adjustable exchange rate, thereby signaling a commitment to market-based currency management and external financial stability. The loan is to be used for rebuilding the central bank's foreign reserves in order to aid the currency.

In parallel with fiscal and monetary reforms, the Milei administration aggressively pursued structural liberalization. Trade policies were overhauled through the reduction of import tariffs and the elimination of export controls, particularly affecting agricultural and industrial goods. Regulatory simplification was a cornerstone of this agenda, with measures implemented to reduce bureaucratic burdens, streamline licensing requirements, and facilitate business operations across multiple sectors. The government introduced targeted incentives for large-scale investment projects, particularly in infrastructure, energy, and extractive industries, establishing legal and financial frameworks designed to attract foreign direct investment and stimulate capital inflows. Labour and tenancy markets were also reformed, with contractual flexibility enhanced and the possibility of denominating rents or employment agreements in foreign currency permitted, reflecting a broader commitment to liberalized market arrangements.

On April 14, 2025, the government officially ended broad restrictions preventing individuals from purchasing U.S. dollars and other foreign currencies through official channels. Alongside this, it established a currency band for the peso rather than maintaining a fixed or tightly pegged rate. Under this scheme the Argentine peso (ARS) was allowed to trade within a band of roughly ARS 1,000 to ARS 1,400 per U.S. dollar. The band was designed to widen gradually, approximately 1% per month, to ease the transition to a more flexible rate regime.

=== 2026 ===
Though substantial improvements have been made to liberalise the Argentine peso, it still remains overvalued. In January 2026, president Javier Milei's government says it will adopt a new monetary framework, adjust the peso's trading bands in line with inflation and build up Central Bank's international reserves. “From January 1, 2026, the ceiling and the floor of the exchange rate band will evolve each month in line with the most recent monthly inflation figure,” Central Bank Governor Santiago Bausili said at a press conference, referring to data published by the national statistics institute, INDEC. Alongside changes to the peso's trading bands, the Central Bank also announced that it will roll out a new programme to build up international reserves.

For decades the economy and currency of Argentina had been unstable, shifting from rapid growth to recession. This resulted in the Argentine populace developing a distrust of banks and other financial institutions, preferring to stash both dollar and peso at home ‘under-the-mattress’. “There’s nearly US$200 billion sitting under mattresses that could be earning interest and generating credit,” Economy Minister Luis Caputo said at a conference with local investors in December. Milei's decision to implement a "tax amnesty program" would result in deposits above US$100,000 having to remain untouched in bank or brokerage accounts until January 1, 2026, to avoid a levy. Deposits of up to 69,000 dollars are free of taxation and scrutiny.

== Results ==
=== Inflation ===
Annual inflation stood at 254.2% in the first month of Milei's term. Monthly inflation slowed in February 2024 for a second consecutive month as Milei continued to push austerity and deregulation measures aimed at stabilizing the nation's economy. Argentina's monthly inflation slowed to 13.2% in February 2024, compared to 20.6% in January 2024 and 25.5% in December 2023. By February 2025, monthly inflation was reported to be at a five-year low of 2.2%. In June 2025, it reached another 5-year low of 1.5%.

As of April 14, 2025, Argentina lifted most of its long-standing currency controls (the “cepo cambiario”), allowing individuals and businesses to purchase U.S. dollars without restriction and to repatriate profits abroad. This move was driven by a desire to normalize the business environment, stimulate foreign and domestic investment, and provide companies with freer access to foreign currency for imports. It is a cornerstone of Milei's broader economic stabilization strategy. The disintegration of capital controls has effectively ended the dual exchange rate system as the two exchange rates converged for the first time since 2019, ending black market demand for the dollar.

Analysts attributed the decline in inflation to reduced deficit spending, leading to a decrease in monetary expansion. Decreases in the prices of some key items in the consumer price index such as electricity and rent have contributed as well. In April 2025 with the removal of most capital controls, the gap between the official and parallel exchange rates almost fully closed for the first time since 2019 due to the policies of Milei.

Government spending has decreased by 27.2 percent, reducing primary spending from 185 trillion pesos to 134 trillion pesos (approximately 8 billion dollars) in two years. Despite significant decreases in spending, the economy has grown.

=== Reforms ===
President Javier Milei's implementation of “shock therapy” in Argentina - centered on sweeping austerity, subsidy removals, deregulation, and a sharp devaluation of the peso was accompanied by significant social challenges and early signs of macroeconomic stabilization. According to Bloomberg, his measures have aggravated income inequality, disproportionately benefiting wealthier Argentines while leaving lower-income households burdened by higher utility bills, transport costs, and food prices. Bloomberg reports Argentina's gini coefficient to have gone from 0.416 to 0.43 in a matter of months. Many Argentines, especially pensioners and workers in education, health, and transport, faced mounting hardship. These austerity measures fueled frequent mass protests and general strikes, as unions, students, and civil society decried deepening poverty and inequality. In 2024, public universities across Argentina - including major institutions like the University of Buenos Aires - collapsed into crisis as professors and non-teaching staff demanded urgently needed pay raises to offset hyperinflation exceeding 200%, which had eroded wages by around 60%, leaving average associate professor pay at merely $320 per month and teaching assistants at $120. Milei refused to increase their salaries, prompting widespread protests, open-air classes in Plaza de Mayo, mass resignations, staff shortages, and universities going into paralytic strikes. The government countered by offering a meager 6.8% raise, which unions deemed grossly insufficient, as the crisis prompted concerns over the sustainability of Argentina's system of free, public higher education.

In 2025, Javier Milei proposed a bill which would reform and modernize the archaic labour system of Argentina. In 2026 he intends for Congress to approve the national budget, new regulations to allow mining in glacier areas, and labor, tax and criminal code reforms. Unions have strongly opposed Milei's announced labor reform, which will seek to give employers more flexibility on working hours and vacations, as well as modify the system of severance pay in order to reduce costs for companies. Officials have said that the proposed change to the penal code will lengthen sentences for certain crimes, including homicide. No details of the planned tax reform have been released, though it's expected to simplify the tax system. The drive would make it easier to hire and fire workers. It seeks to bring many of the 42 percent of informal labourers into the formal job market, which would improve their labour conditions and boost government revenue. Proposed changes include new rules for holiday periods, adjustments to dismissal and severance pay, the creation of new funds to finance redundancy payouts and modifications to notice periods.

"He has done more good than many people expected", said Alejandro Werner, a former official with the International Monetary Fund. "Maybe I would choose to do it a different way. But, sometimes, to change things, you need somebody that’s a little bit of a fanatic to really move the needle. And he has done it." Though the macroeconomic side had become stabilized, the societal consequences were palpable. Patience towards president Milei's reforms runs thin.

=== Poverty ===
In the first months of Milei's administration, the poverty rate spiked from 41.7% in late 2023 to 52.9% in early 2024. In response, La Libertad Avanza pointed out that poverty had already been increasing substantially before Milei took office. By the third quarter of 2024, the poverty rate declined to 38.1%. Torcuato Di Tella University estimates the poverty rate to be 33.5% by the end of January 2025. Meanwhile, the UCA (Catholic University of Argentina) voiced that although the projected indices had reached similar levels to the previous year for the third quarter of 2024 (41.7%), the consumer capacity of households experienced a reduction due to higher costs of basic services such as electricity, water, gas and transport, among others. Poverty is expected to reduce by INDEC as the country stabilizes.

Consumption had markedly decreased under Milei since the start of his presidency, showing a 10,2% year-over-year drop in February 2025, compared to February 2024. The strongest decline was seen in September 2024, where consumption had decreased 22,3% compared to the year before it, in line with the estimates concerning austerity.

An economist working for CEDLAS (Center for distributive, Labour and Social Studies), estimates that between October 2024 and March 2025, the poverty rate dropped to 34.4%. A report published in July 2025 largely confirmed these predictions, finding that Argentina's urban poverty rate dropped to 31.6% in the first half of 2025, its lowest level since 2018. Extreme poverty also decreased from 18.2% to 7.4% annually.

In the first half of 2025, reports indicate that the middle class grew by 7.7 million, rebounding back to pre-pandemic levels of 39% INDEC reported the official poverty rate to be 31.6% of the general population in the first half of 2025, with household poverty coming in at 24.1%. The UCA disputes the magnitude of the reduction, arguing that INDEC uses an inadequate methodology. They find that poverty has decreased to 36.3%, compared to their previous estimate of 45.6% in the same period a year ago, and lowest since 2018.

=== Social impact ===
Despite repressive protests measures and restrictions on street demonstrations, spontaneous public mobilizations erupted, culminating in a general strike led by trade unions. Women's marches, sectoral strikes, and widespread social movement protests emerged. While some reforms were partially blocked—such as labor-related emergency decrees—the government sustained its legislative drive, even as social unrest mounted and political dialogue remained limited.

A December 2024 Gallup poll showed improved public perception: 53% of Argentines believed their standard of living was improving, reaching levels not seen since 2015, and 41% believed the economy of their city was improving.

In 2024, wages in Argentina rose by 145.5%, outpacing the 117.8% inflation rate, according to INDEC. According to Nowcast, the year-over-year increase in total family income (ITF) reached 185.7%. However, wage growth varied by sector. Formal private sector salaries increased by 147.5%, slightly above inflation, while public sector wages rose by only 119.3%. The biggest jump was in the informal sector, where incomes rebounded by 196.7%. Despite wage increases, real income recovery has been uneven. In October 2024, CEPA reported that private sector wages had nearly returned to November 2023 levels. However, public sector incomes remained 14.8% lower, and informal workers were still down 21.3%. Continuing this trend, wages have risen by 20.7% in the first half of 2025, above an inflation rate of 15.1%.

By repealing rent controls, the rental housing supply rose by 170% as real rent prices decreased by 40% (adjusted for inflation).

Milei's rapid austerity has imposed heavy social costs. Deep cuts to public spending have reduced access to welfare, healthcare, and education, leaving households exposed to higher costs. Reliance on an artificially strong currency and potential peso float could trigger further price volatility, hitting the poor hardest. Aggressive policies and challenges to independent institutions risk eroding the social safety net and increasing inequality.

Income inequality increased slightly from 0.417 to 0.436 in 2024, but decreased to 0.427 by the end of 2025.

=== Economic growth ===
His policies have improved Argentina's standing with the IMF, raising hopes for further assistance. In the first and second quarter of 2024, Argentina's GDP contracted by 2.1% and 1.8%. However, in the last quarter, it expanded 3.9% despite the significant austerity Implemented by the president. Agriculture rebounded from a severe drought, achieving an growth rate of 80.2% as conditions improved. The economy of Argentina is projected to grow by 5.5% in 2025 by the BBVA, and 3.5% by Goldman Sachs as inflation stabilizes and investment starts pouring in due to the Milei's liberalisation of the economy. The financial improvements seen in the 3rd quarter of 2024 are complemented by society's renewed confidence in the government, creating a positive outlook for 2025.

Argentina's Vaca Muerta shale formation is driving a major energy boom, making the country a net energy exporter for the first time in 14 years. With the world's fourth-largest shale oil reserves and second largest shale gas deposits, Argentina is forecasted to overtake Colombia as South America's third-largest crude producer in 2025. Estimates suggest that Argentina's production in 2030 will scale to 1 million barrels per day as Milei's increases efforts in the extraction of oil and gas and reduces the existing capital controls, export taxes and regulations.

Moody's have increased Argentina's rating from 'Ca' to 'Caa3 as Argentina's economy demonstrates solid recovery progress. GDP is expected to grow 5.5% in 2025, and average wages increased 20.7% in the first half of 2025, outpacing the country's 15.1% inflation rate. Milei has contended that a fiscal surplus remains non-negotiable, with a target of 1.6% for 2025.

Milei's loss in the local elections of Buenos Aires resulted in economic turmoil as the Argentine market reacted negatively to the return of Peronism, which would result in the inability of Milei to carry out his reforms. US secretary Scott Bessent's decision to conduct a 20 billion dollar swap line halted the crisis. Javier Milei's victory in the legislative midterm elections of 2025 was followed by a sharp market rally, leading towards bonds increasing by 23% in a day, the Argentine stock market growing by 70% compared to last month and the peso briefly appreciating in value. The country risk index dropped by 40% after the elections.
