= Presidency of Raúl Alfonsín =

Argentine presidency from 1989 to 1999

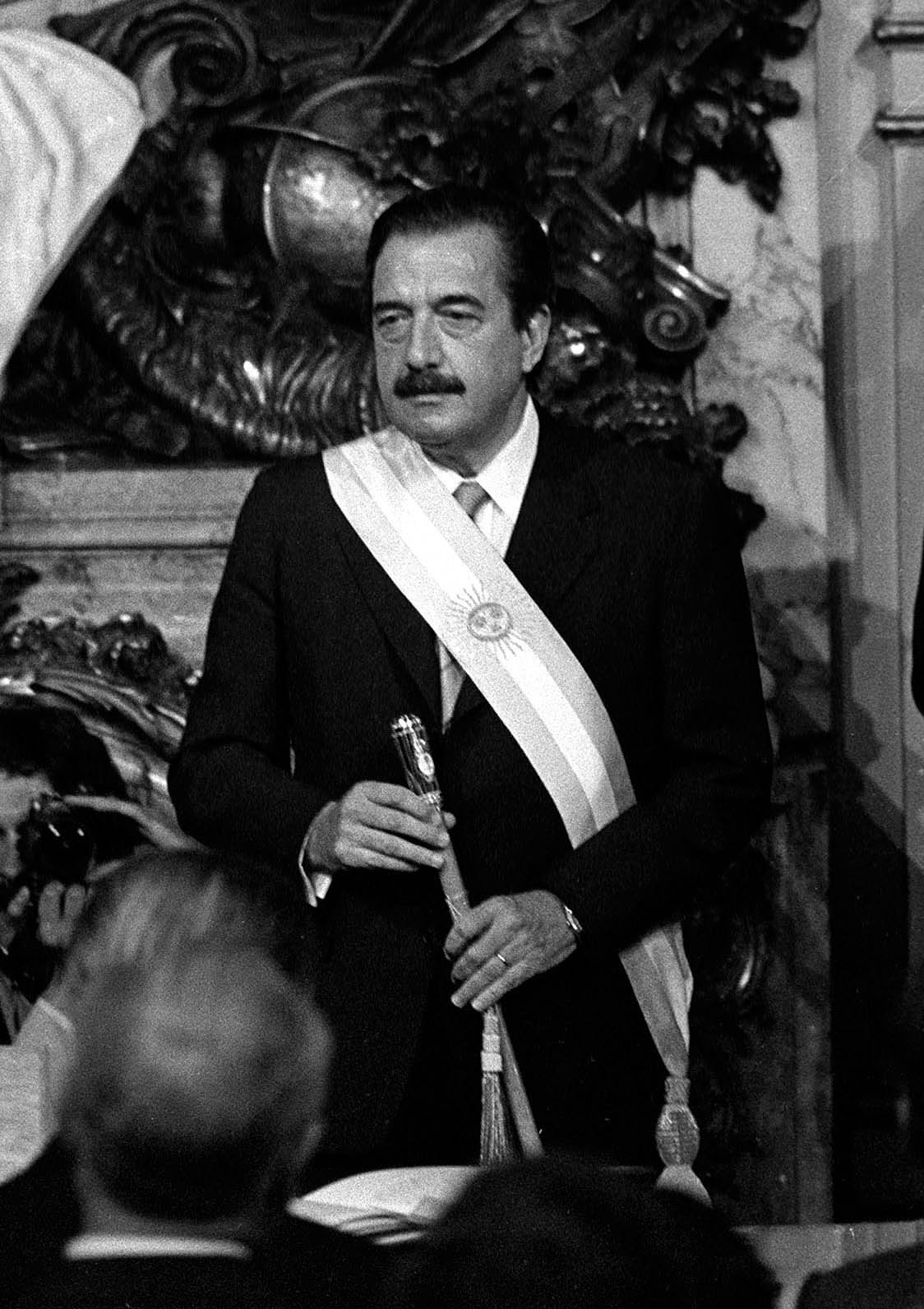
- Presidency of Raúl Alfonsín; 10 December 1983 – 8 July 1989
- President: Raúl Alfonsín
- Party: Radical Civic Union (UCR)
- Election: 1983
- Seat: Casa Rosada; Quinta de Olivos
- Standard of the President

The presidency of Raúl Alfonsín lasted from 10 December 1983, the date when Argentina regained its democracy after the last civic-military dictatorship (1976–1983), to 8 July 1989, when Alfonsín handed over power to Carlos Menem ahead of schedule due to an economic crisis that resulted in hyperinflation.

== New beginning ==
Inaugural speech of President Raúl Alfonsín (Spanish). Source: Televisión Pública Argentina

Chief among Alfonsín's inherited problems was an economic depression stemming from the 1981–82 financial collapse and its resulting US$43 billion foreign debt, with interest payments that swallowed all of Argentina's US$3 billion trade surplus. The economy recovered modestly in 1983 as a result of Bignone's lifting of wage freezes and crushing interest rates imposed by the Central Bank's "Circular 1050;" but inflation raged at 400%, GDP per capita remained at its lowest level since 1968 and fixed investment was 40% lower than in 1980. Naming a generally center-left cabinet led by Foreign Minister Dante Caputo and Economy Minister Bernardo Grinspun (his campaign manager), Alfonsín began his administration with high approval ratings and with the fulfillment of campaign promises such as a nutritional assistance program for the 27% of Argentines under the poverty line at the time, as well as the recission of Bignone's April 1983 blanket amnesty for those guilty of human rights abuses and his September decree authorizing warrantless wiretapping. Defense Minister Raúl Borrás advised Alfonsín to remove Fabricaciones Militares, then Argentina's leading defense contractor, from the Armed Forces' control, ordering the retirement of 70 generals and admirals known for their opposition to the transfer of the lucrative contractor.

Appointing renowned playwright Carlos Gorostiza as Secretary of Culture and exiled computer scientist Dr. Manuel Sadosky as Secretary of Science and Technology, hundreds of artists and scientists returned to Argentina during 1984. Gorostiza abolished the infamous National Film Rating Entity, helping lead to a doubling in film and theatre production. The harrowing La historia oficial (The Official Story) was released in April 1985 and became the first Argentine film to receive an Academy Award for Best Foreign Language Film. Alfonsín created the National Commission on the Disappearance of Persons (CONADEP) to document human rights abuses. Led by novelist Ernesto Sábato, CONADEP documented 8,960 forced disappearances and presented the President with its findings on September 20. The report drew mixed reaction, however, as its stated total of victims fell short of Amnesty International's estimate of 16,000 and of the Mothers of the Plaza de Mayo's estimate of 30,000.

Alfonsín had leading members of leftist groups prosecuted, leading to jail sentences for, among others, Montoneros leader Mario Firmenich. He sought to improve relations with Peronists by pardoning former President Isabel Perón in May 1984 for her prominent role in the early stages of the Dirty War against dissidents and for her alleged embezzlement of public funds, though his introduction of legislation providing for secret ballot labor union elections led to opposition by the CGT, Argentina's largest, and handed his administration its first defeat when the Senate struck it down by one vote.

Relations with the United States suffered when Alfonsín terminated the previous regime's support for the Contras. Two meetings with U.S. President Ronald Reagan failed to bring economic concessions towards Argentina. Alfonsín initiated the first diplomatic contact with the United Kingdom since the Falklands War two years earlier, resulting in the lifting of British trade sanctions. Proposing a Treaty with Chile ending a border dispute over the Beagle Channel, he put the issue before voters in a referendum and won its approval with 82%.

== Tackling inflation and impunity ==
Inheriting a foreign debt crisis exacerbated by high global interest rates, Alfonsín had to contend with shattered business confidence and record budget deficits. GDP grew by a modest 2% in 1984, though fixed investment continued to decline and inflation rose to 700%. Losses in the State enterprises, service on the public debt and growing tax evasion left the federal budget with a US$10 billion shortfall in 1984 (13% of GDP). Unable to finance the budget, the Central Bank of Argentina "printed" money and inflation, which was bad enough at around 18% a month at the end of the dictatorship, rose to 30% in June 1985 (the world's highest, at the time). Attempting to control the record inflation, the new Minister of the Economy, Juan Sourrouille, launched the Austral Plan, by which prices were frozen and the existing currency, the peso argentino, was replaced by the Argentine austral at 1,000 to one.

Sharp budget cuts were enacted, particularly in military spending which, including cutbacks in 1984, was slashed to around half of its 1983 level. Responding to financial sector concerns, the government also introduced a mechanism called desagio, by which debtors whose installments were based on much higher built-in inflation would receive a temporary discount compensating for the sudden drop in inflation and interest rates; inflation, running at 30% in June, plummeted to 2% a month for the remainder of 1985. The fiscal deficit fell by two-thirds in 1985, helping pave the way for the first meaningful debt rescheduling since the start of the crisis four years earlier. Sharp cuts in military spending fed growing discontent in the military, and several bomb threats and acts of sabotage at numerous military bases were blamed on hard-line officers, chiefly former 1st Army Corps head Gen. Guillermo Suárez Mason, who fled to Miami following an October arrest order.

Unable to persuade the military to court martial officers guilty of Dirty War abuses, Alfonsín sponsored the Trial of the Juntas, whose first hearings began at the Supreme Court on April 22, 1985. Prosecuting some of the top members of the previous military regime for crimes committed during the Dirty War, the trial became the focus of international attention. In December, the tribunal handed down life sentences against former President Jorge Videla and former Navy Chief Emilio Massera, as well as 17-year sentences against three others. For these accomplishments, Alfonsín was awarded the first Prize For Freedom of the Liberal International and the Human Rights Prize by the Council of Europe, never before awarded to an individual. Four defendants were acquitted, notably former President Leopoldo Galtieri, though he and two others were court-martialed in May 1986 for malfeasance during the Falklands War, receiving 12-year prison sentences.

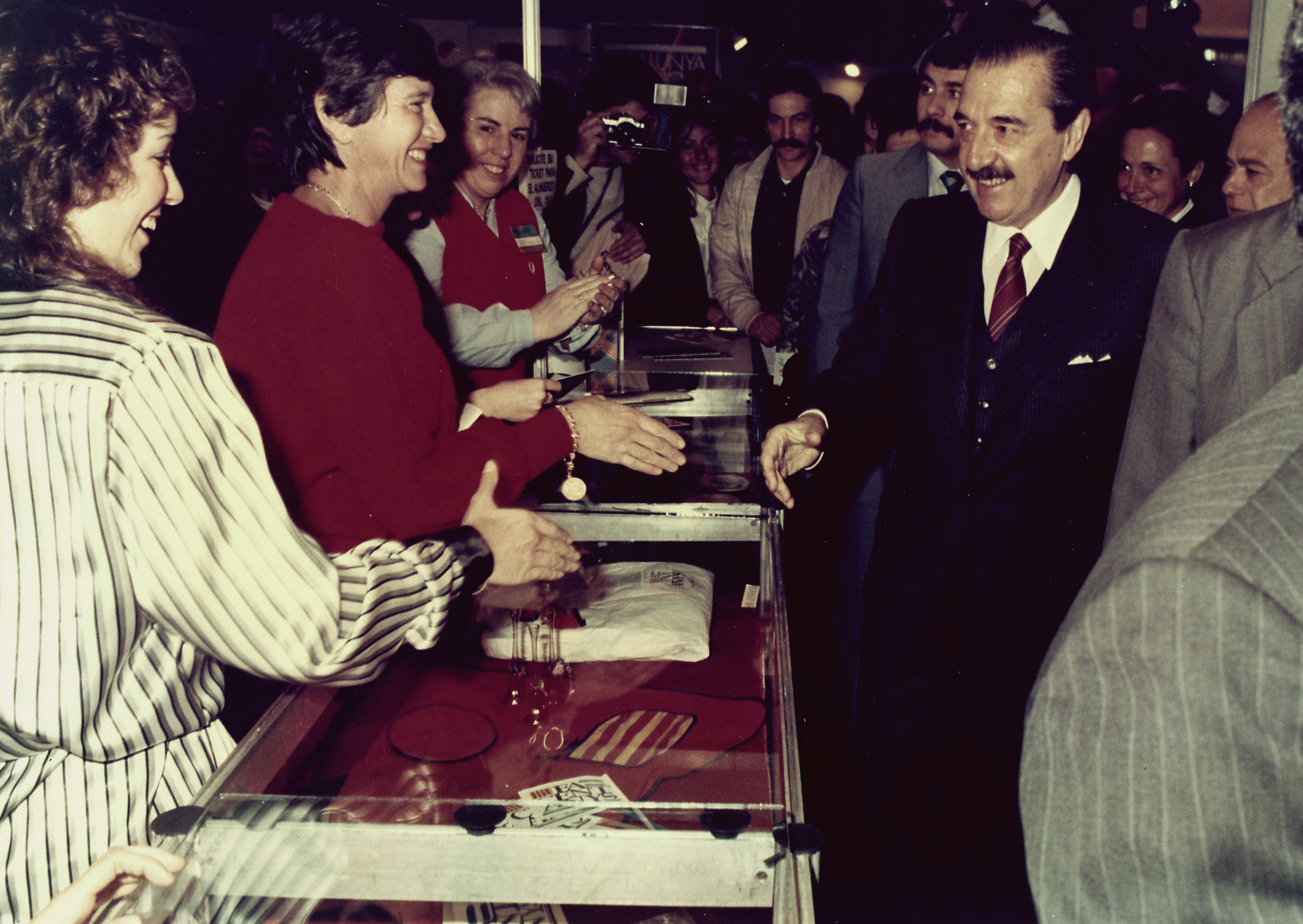
Alfonsín visiting an exhibition in 1986.

These developments contributed to a strong showing by the UCR in the November 1985 legislative elections. They gained one seat in the Lower House of Congress and would control 130 of the 254 seats. The Justicialists lost eight seats (leaving 103) and smaller, provincial parties made up the difference. Alfonsín surprised observers in April 1986 by announcing the creation of a panel entrusted to plan the transfer of the nation's capital to Viedma, a small coastal city 800 km (500 mi) south of Buenos Aires. His proposals boldly called for constitutional amendments creating a Parliamentary system, including a prime minister, and were well received by the Lower House, though they encountered strong opposition in the Senate.

Economic concerns continued to dominate the national discourse, and sharp fall in global commodity prices in 1986 stymied hopes for lasting financial stability. The nation's record US$4.5 billion trade surplus was cut in half and inflation had declined to 50% in the twelve months to June 1986 (compared to 1,130% to June 1985). Inflation, which had been targeted for 28% in the calendar year, soon began to rise, however, exceeding 80% in 1986. GDP, which had fallen by 5% in 1985, recovered by 7% in 1986, led by a rise in machinery purchases and consumer spending. Repeated wage freezes ordered by Economy Minister Sourouille led to an erosion in real wages of about 20% during the Austral Plan's first year, triggering seven general strikes by the CGT during the same period. The President's August appointment of a conservative economist, José Luis Machinea, as President of the Central Bank pleased the financial sector; but it did little to stem continuing capital flight. Affluent Argentines were believed to hold over US$50 billion in overseas deposits. Alfonsín made several state visits abroad, securing a number of trade deals.

The President's international reputation for his human rights record suffered in December 1986, when on his initiative Congress passed the Full Stop Law, which limited the civil trials against roughly 600 officers implicated in the Dirty War to those indicted within 60 days of the law's passage, a tall order given the reluctance of many victims and witnesses to testify. Despite these concessions, a group identified as Carapintadas ("painted faces," from their use of camouflage paint) loyal to Army Major Aldo Rico, staged a mutiny of the Army training base of Campo de Mayo and near Córdoba during the Easter weekend in 1987. Negotiating in person with the rebels, who objected to ongoing civil trials but enjoyed little support elsewhere in the Armed Forces, Alfonsín secured their surrender. Returning to the Casa Rosada, where an anxious population was waiting for news, he announced: La casa está en orden y no hay sangre en Argentina. ¡Felices pascuas! ("The house is in order and there's no blood in Argentina. Happy Easter!"), to signify the end of the crisis.

His subsequent appointment of General Dante Caridi as Army Chief of Staff further strained relations with the military and in June, Congress passed Alfonsín's Law of Due Obedience, granting immunity to officers implicated in crimes against humanity on the basis of "due obedience." This law, condemned by Amnesty International, among others, effectively halted most remaining prosecutions of Dirty War criminals. The climate of tension between those on either side of the issue was aggravated by the suspicious death in 1986 of Defense Minister Roque Carranza while at the Campo de Mayo military base and by the September 1987 discovery of the body of prominent banker Osvaldo Sivak, the victim of a police-orchestrated kidnapping for a ransom of over a million US dollars. During this political turn to the right, Alfonsín did manage the passage of the legalization of divorce, helping resolve the legal status of 3 million adults (1 in 6) who were separated from their spouses. He also passed the Antidiscrimination Law of 1987, a bill supported by Argentina's sizable Jewish and Gypsy communities. He was awarded the Moisés (Moses) Prize by the Argentine Jewish community for the accomplishment.

== A turn for the worse ==
A severe drought early in 1987 led to a new decline in exports, which reached their lowest level in a decade, nearly cancelling the vital trade surplus and leaving a US$6 billion current account deficit. The problem and the efforts of Alfonsín's debt negotiator, Daniel Marx, helped secure the record rescheduling of US$19 billion in foreign public debt (a third of the total); but speculators' concerns led to a sudden fall in the value of the austral, which lost half its value between June and October. As most Argentine wholesalers accepted only U.S. dollars at the time, this inevitably led to higher inflation, which leapt from 5% monthly in the first half of 1987 to 20% in October. Unimpressed by Alfonsín's appointment of a Labor Minister from within the CGT's ranks, their leader, Saúl Ubaldini, called two more general strikes during the year (hundreds of smaller, sectoral strikes erupted, as well).

A positive rapport between Alfonsín and the new, democratically elected President of Brazil, José Sarney, helped lead to initial agreements for a common market between the two nations and Uruguay in January 1988. Meeting in the Uruguayan resort of Punta del Este, they agreed to subsidize intra-regional exports with a special currency for the purpose (the Gaucho). A new Minister of Public Works, Rodolfo Terragno, an academic with a long history in the UCR, prevailed on the administration to allow a novel, if controversial, search for needed foreign exchange: privatizations. A number of factories and rail lines were offered for sale and, in September 1987, the effort yielded its first results with the sale of Austral Airlines, a domestic carrier. Subsequent instability and the fallout from the Wall Street Crash of 1987 dampened further deals, however, and left Sourouille little choice but to raise taxes. GDP managed a 3% rise in 1987, led by higher construction spending, though inflation rose to 175% and real wages declined around 10%, leaving them lower than they were in 1983.

This turn for the worse helped to a significant setback for Alfonsín's UCR in local and legislative elections in September 1987. The UCR lost 13 seats in Congress (leaving 117). Though still enjoying a 12-seat advantage over Justicialists, this deprived the UCR of its absolute majority in the Lower House and, five seats short of a majority in the Senate, this effectively suspended much of the UCR's legislative agenda, particularly the planned transfer of the capital to the Patagonia region. UCR governors fared even worse: the 1987 mid-term election left only two, toppling, among four others, Governor Armendáriz of the paramount Province of Buenos Aires. Ongoing military discontent reached a flash point when Major Aldo Rico, the instigator of the Easter Rebellion, escaped from house arrest and promptly organized a second mutiny in January 1988; this mutiny was, again, quickly subdued. The resulting tension and continuing stagflation set the stage for Alfonsín's announcement that elections, scheduled for October 1989, would be moved up five months earlier.

The campaign made strange bedfellows of Alfonsín and the CGT during the May 1988 Justicialist Party convention. The CGT was averse to the frontrunner for the nomination, Buenos Aires Governor Antonio Cafiero. The President, in turn, preferred to see his struggling UCR (14 points behind in the polls) matched against Cafiero's rival, Carlos Menem, a little-known and flamboyant governor of one of the nation's smallest provinces. The primaries resulted in an upset, however, and Menem was nominated the Justicialist Party's standard bearer. The UCR, for its part, made a safe choice: Eduardo Angeloz, the centrist governor of Córdoba Province (Argentina's second-largest) and the most prominent UCR figure not closely tied to the unpopular Alfonsín.

The Austral Plan continued to disintegrate as the economy slipped back into recession. Inflation continued at 15-20% a month and in August, reached 27%. Foreign debt installments fell into arrears in April when Alfonsín ordered the Central Bank to curtail payments. Coinciding with the Southern Hemisphere's change of seasons, Economy Minister Sorouille announced a Plan Primavera ("Springtime Plan") on August 3, whose centerpiece was a price truce agreed on with 53 leading wholesalers. The plan also included a fresh wage freeze, however, triggering a September 9 general strike by the CGT that turned violent when police repressed demonstrators at the Plaza de Mayo.

Violent and white collar crime were of increasing concern among the public and, though the judicial system scored a victory when Banco Alas executives were convicted the same day for fraud committed against the Central Bank totalling US$110 million, their receiving a suspended sentence in exchange for the return of half the funds and the subsequent discovery of a sub-rosa "parallel customs" operated by National Customs Director Juan Carlos Delconte cast serious doubts on Alfonsín's commitment against large-scale corruption, which had become endemic to Argentine government and business during the 1970s.

Alfonsín obtained INTERPOL's cooperation in extraditing fugitive Army Corps leader Gen. Guillermo Suárez Mason (a leading Dirty War perpetrator whose control over YPF nearly bankrupted the state oil concern in 1983) and Argentine Anticommunist Alliance mastermind José López Rega, who were found exiled in the United States and returned to stand trial in 1987. The President's relationship with the military remained tenuous. Continuing military budget cuts and opposition to democratic rule led the extremist Carapintadas to stage a third mutiny on December 1, receiving support from disaffected members of the Coast Guard, among others. The impasse lasted six days, resulting in the arrest of their leader, Col. Mohamed Alí Seineldín, an Army officer with a long history of violence and antisemitism. In the interest of compromise, Alfonsín announced a modest military budget increase and the dismissal of the moderate Gen. Dante Caridi as Army Chief of Staff. A January 23, 1989 attack on the Regiment of La Tablada by a leftist armed organization led to 39 deaths and tested Alfonsín's improved rapport with the military, which was consequently given wide latitude to prosecute the matter, leading to the alleged torture of a number of the conspirators.

The economy had benefited only modestly from lower inflation, which had fallen from 27% in August to 5-10% monthly for the rest of 1988. Owing to the mid-year recession, GDP fell 2% in 1988 and inflation rose to 380% while real wages continued to slide. Exports did recover and the trade surplus rose to nearly US$4 billion. The Springtime Plan, however, increasingly depended on its reserves to shore up the austral, whose stability guaranteed lower inflation rates. In so doing, the Central Bank shed almost all its US$3 billion in reserves and, in heavy trading on "Black Tuesday," February 7, 1989, the U.S. dollar gained around 40% against the austral. The sudden drop in the austral's value threatened the nation's tenuous financial stability and, later that month, the World Bank recalled a large tranche of a loan package agreed on in 1988, sending the austral into a tailspin: trading at 17 to the dollar in January, the dollar quoted at over 100 australes by election day, May 14. Inflation, which had been held below 10% a month as late as February, rose to 78.5% in May, shattering records and leading to a landslide victory for the Justicialist candidate, Carlos Menem. Polling revealed that economic anxieties were paramount among two-thirds of voters and Menem won in 19 of 22 provinces, while losing in the traditionally anti-Peronist Federal District (Buenos Aires).

The nation's finances did not stabilize after the election, as hoped. The dollar doubled in value that next week, alone and, on May 29, riots and looting broke out in the poorer outskirts of a number of cities, particularly Rosario. Inflation continued its dizzying rise: 114% a month in June and 197% in July. Income poverty leapt from around 30% to 47% during the debacle and the economy shrank by 7% in 1989, pushing per capita GDP to its lowest level since 1964. Having declared his intention to stay on until inaugural day, December 10, these events and spiraling financial chaos led Alfonsín to transfer power to President-elect Menem on July 8.

== Cabinet ==
Ministry	Minister	Party	Start	End
Minister of the Interior	Antonio Américo Tróccoli	Radical Civic Union	10 December 1983	15 September 1987
Minister of the Interior	Enrique Nosiglia	Radical Civic Union	15 September 1987	16 May 1989
Minister of the Interior	Juan Carlos Pugliese	Radical Civic Union	27 May 1989	8 July 1989
Minister of Foreign Affairs and Worship	Dante Caputo	Radical Civic Union	10 December 1983	26 May 1989
Minister of Foreign Affairs and Worship	Susana Cerutti	Radical Civic Union	27 May 1989	8 July 1989
Minister of Defense	Raúl Borrás	Radical Civic Union	10 December 1983	25 May 1985
Minister of Defense	Roque Carranza	Radical Civic Union	29 May 1985	8 February 1986
Minister of Defense	Germán López	Radical Civic Union	13 February 1986	2 June 1986
Minister of Defense	José Horacio Jaunarena	Radical Civic Union	5 June 1986	8 July 1989
Minister of Economy	Bernardo Grinspun	Radical Civic Union	10 December 1983	18 February 1985
Minister of Economy	Juan Vital Sourrouille	Independent	18 February 1985	31 March 1989
Minister of Economy	Juan Carlos Pugliese	Radical Civic Union	31 March 1989	14 May 1989
Minister of Economy	Jesús Rodríguez	Radical Civic Union	14 May 1989	8 July 1989
Minister of Education	Carlos Alconada Aramburu	Radical Civic Union	10 December 1983	21 June 1986
Minister of Education	Julio Rajneri	Independent	21 June 1986	10 September 1987
Minister of Education	Jorge Federico Sabato	Radical Civic Union	10 September 1987	26 May 1989
Minister of Education	José Gabriel Dumón	Radical Civic Union	27 May 1989	8 July 1989
Minister of Public Works and Services	Roque Carranza	Radical Civic Union	10 December 1983	27 May 1985
Minister of Public Works and Services	Roberto Tomasini	Radical Civic Union	27 May 1985	3 July 1986
Minister of Public Works and Services	Pedro Trucco	Radical Civic Union	3 July 1986	16 September 1987
Minister of Public Works and Services	Rodolfo Terragno	Radical Civic Union	16 September 1987	26 May 1989
Minister of Public Works and Services	Roberto Pedro Echarte	Radical Civic Union	26 May 1989	8 July 1989
Minister of Labour	Antonio Mucci	Radical Civic Union	10 December 1983	24 April 1984
Minister of Labour	Juan Manuel Casella	Radical Civic Union	24 April 1984	31 October 1984
Minister of Labour	Hugo Barrionuevo	Justicialist Party	31 October 1984	27 March 1987
Minister of Labour	Carlos Alderete	Justicialist Party	27 March 1987	16 September 1987
Minister of Labour	Ideler Tonelli	Radical Civic Union	16 September 1987	8 July 1989
Minister of Health and Social Development	Aldo Neri	Radical Civic Union	10 December 1983	15 April 1986
Minister of Health and Social Development	Conrado Storani	Radical Civic Union	15 April 1986	16 September 1987
Minister of Health and Social Development	Ricardo Barrios Arrechea	Radical Civic Union	16 September 1987	26 May 1989
Minister of Health and Social Development	Enrique Beveraggi	Radical Civic Union	26 May 1989	8 July 1989

=== Presidential secretariats ===
Ministry	Minister	Party	Start	End
General Secretary	Germán López	Radical Civic Union	10 December 1983	9 February 1986
General Secretary	Carlos Becerra	Radical Civic Union	9 February 1986	8 July 1989
Legal and Technical Secretary	Jorge Luis Fernández Pastor	Independent	10 December 1983	5 May 1988
Legal and Technical Secretary	Horacio Jorge Costa	Independent	5 May 1988	29 June 1989
Secretary of State Intelligence	Roberto Peña	Justicialist Party	10 December 1983	1 January 1986
Secretary of State Intelligence	Facundo Suárez	Radical Civic Union	1 January 1986	8 July 1989
Secretary of Culture	Carlos Gorostiza	Independent	10 December 1983	February 1986
Secretary of Culture	Marcos Aguinis	Independent	February 1986	21 January 1987
Secretary of Culture	Carlos Bastianes	Independent	21 January 1987	8 July 1989
