= 1989 hyperinflation in Argentina =

Economic crisis in Argentina

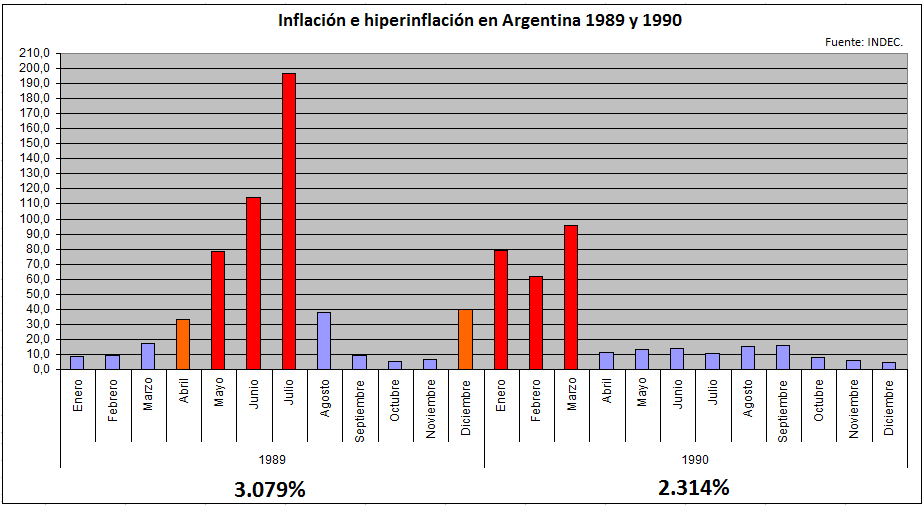
Inflation rates in Argentina in 1989 and 1990, by month.

Argentina had a severe hyperinflation in 1989, the final year of the presidency of Raúl Alfonsín, who resigned because of it. Carlos Menem, president-elect at the time, took office earlier as a result. Hyperinflation continued during 1990, and ended with the convertibility plan. Both years the inflation rate was above 2600%.

== Development ==
Raúl Alfonsín lost the 1987 Argentine legislative election and, unable to regain public support, started the Spring plan in 1988 to stop the growing inflation before the 1989 Argentine general election. The government negotiated price controls with the Argentine Industrial Union and a rise in taxes. The foreign exchange market was split into a commercial and a financial market. The commercial market would be used for the exports from the primary sector of the economy and the financial one for the exports from the secondary sector. However, the net exports of the primary sector diminished as a result of a drought. And a rise in the international rate of interest complicated things even further. The minister of economy Juan Vital Sourrouille claimed that the Central Bank of Argentina had enough foreign exchange reserves to keep the free market under control, but refused to clarify the exact number of reserves available.

In addition, the government failed to reduce the fiscal deficit, and the attempts to implement reforms on the state were opposed by Peronism and unions. By the end of 1998, the cost of living had risen by 350%, the fiscal deficit was growing, and the default from April 1988 prevented external financing. George H. W. Bush replaced Ronald Reagan as president of the United States, and gave less support to Argentina. The proposals of Peronist candidate Carlos Menem increased the concerns of the financial sector, as he proposed a massive raise in wages and a "productive revolution" to solve the crisis, without giving further details.

The Central Bank tried in January 1989 to keep the dollar price stable, but lost all reserves in a few weeks. The dollar price grew rapidly, and the prices of local goods increased to keep up with it, leading to hyperinflation. Sourrouille resigned, and was replaced by Juan Carlos Pugliese, who stayed in the minister for a brief time, and then Jesús Rodríguez. The economic crisis led to the victory of Carlos Menem over the radical candidate Eduardo Angeloz. As most economic agents were unsure of the precise economic policies that Menem would implement, his victory led to speculation and renewed hyperinflation. There were riots in several cities as well. Failing to arrange a proper presidential transition, Alfonsín resigned so that Menem could take office earlier.

== See also ==
- Rodrigazo
- 1998–2002 Argentine great depression

== Bibliography ==
- Belini, Claudio (2020). Historia económica de la Argentina en los siglos XX y XXI [Economic history of Argentina in the 20th and 21st centuries] (in Spanish). Argentina: Siglo Veintiuno Editores. ISBN 978-987-801-039-7.
