= Austral plan =

Argentine economic plan

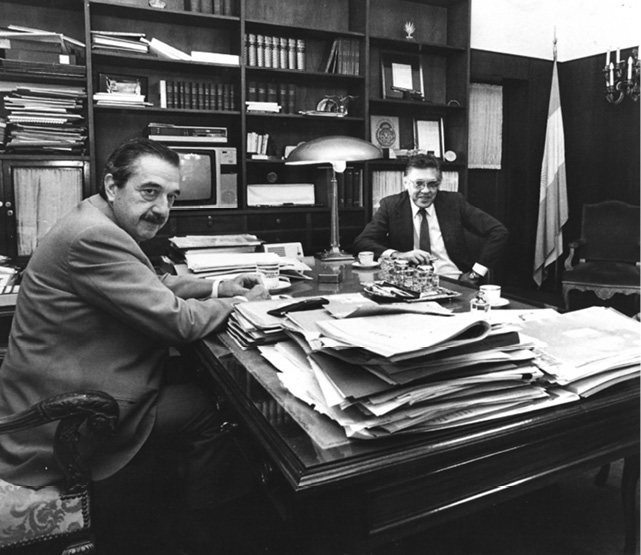
- President Raúl Alfonsín and minister Juan Vital Sourrouille.
- Native name: Plan Austral
- Date: 1985 to 1988
- Location: Argentina
- Type: Economic plan
- Cause: Ongoing economic crisis

The Austral plan (Spanish: Plan Austral) was an Argentine economic plan devised by minister Juan Vital Sourrouille during the presidency of Raúl Alfonsín.

== Previous context ==
Raúl Alfonsín became president of Argentina in 1983 through democratic elections, receiving high inflation rates and a significant external debt taken on by the outgoing Military government. His first minister of economy, Bernardo Grinspun, attempted to negotiate regular increases in wages to keep up with inflation, which did not work. The country was close to a sovereign default in late 1984, and prevented it with foreign funding. Grinspun resigned the following year, as the debt was even higher and the IMF would block further credits. Inflation was nearly 30% monthly, industrial activity decreased, unemployment was near 5% and some provinces began to print quasi-money bonds. He also had disputed with Enrique García Vázquez, president of the Central Bank. Alfonsín said that democracy had little to offer "unless the economic question is definitely resolved".

== Characteristics ==
The Austral plan was designed by the new minister, Juan Vital Sourrouille. It froze prices and wages, stopped the printing of money to mitigate inflation and enacted spending cuts, even higher than those required by the IMF to enable its funding. The Peso argentino currency was replaced by the Austral, according to a rate of 1000 pesos to 1 austral. The government stopped using the Central Bank to finance the national deficit, and tried to negotiate a deal with the foreign creditors. The plan was an instant success, as inflation dropped immediately (even if still at an annual 672%) and the rise of the cost of living dropped from 1000% to 2%. This caused a boost in Alfonsín's public image, leading to a victory of the Radical Civic Union in the 1985 midterm elections.

The economy, however, took a turn for the worse. Although the plan established price controls, dairy products were not reached by it and continued increasing their prices. Although the general idea was to cut excessive spending, it could not be implemented strongly enough. The ministry of economy did not have the authority to enforce such cuts, and Alfonsín distanced himself from several attempted cuts. State enterprises had huge deficits, and the ministry had no authority to control them. Several provinces had deficits and requested financial aid from the national government instead of doing their own spending cuts. As Peronism had control of the Senate of Argentina, they used it to negotiate favorable deals. The Central Bank had to aid several banks to avoid bankruptcy, which increased inflation as well. The fiscal deficit, which had decreased from 10% in 1983 to 4% in 1986, grew again to 7% the following year.

Export prices dropped, decreasing the profit of exports as the reactivation of the economy caused an increase of imports. 1985 saw a trade surplus of 4600 million dollars, which decreased to 500 million dollars as of 1987. The interests of the foreign debt could not be paid anymore, and when the country failed to meet the program arranged with the IMF it lost international financing.

The government was consistently opposed by both Peronism and the labor unions. The unions rejected the wage freeze, and asked for increases. The government soon started to print money again to deal with the increasing debts. As a result, inflation became a problem again in 1986. The government was defeated in the 1987 midterm elections. Trying to fix the renewed economic crisis, the government started a new economic plan, the Spring plan.

== Bibliography ==
- Rock, David (1987). Argentina, 1516–1987: From Spanish Colonization to Alfonsín. United States: University of California Press. ISBN 0-520-06178-0.
- Belini, Claudio (2020). Historia económica de la Argentina en los siglos XX y XXI [Economic history of Argentina in the 20th and 21st centuries] (in Spanish). Argentina: Siglo Veintiuno Editores. ISBN 978-987-801-039-7.
