= Argentine economic crisis =

Argentina has faced several economic crises, such as:

- The Rodrigazo (1975)
- The 1989 hyperinflation in Argentina
- The 1998–2002 Argentine great depression
- The 2018–present Argentine monetary crisis
