= 1987 Carapintada mutiny =

Military uprising in Argentina of 1987

- Part of the Dirty War
| Date | April, 1987 |
| Location | Argentina |
| Result | Government victory |

Belligerents
| (Argentina) Argentine Army | (Argentina) Carapintadas |

Commanders and leaders
| (Argentina) Raúl Alfonsín | (Argentina) Aldo Rico |

In April 1987, members of the "Carapintadas", a faction within the Argentine Army, launched a mutiny against the civilian government of Raúl Alfonsín in response to trials of military officials for crimes committed during the period of military rule.

== Context ==
The Dirty War took place in Argentina during the 1970s and the early 1980s. Left-wing guerrillas, such as Montoneros and ERP, sought to establish a socialist state, as in Cuba. The military, first during the civilian governments of Juan and Isabel Perón, and then during the National Reorganization Process military dictatorship, sought to prevent that. The military defeated the guerrillas, but committed human rights violations during the conflict. New elections were held in 1983, and Raúl Alfonsín became the new president.

The National Commission on the Disappearance of Persons prepared the "Nunca más" report (Spanish: Never again), detailing 8,961 cases of forced disappearances. The Trial of the Juntas sentenced the heads of the military dictatorship, and the full stop law caused an increased number of charges against the military.

== The mutiny ==
Major Ernesto Barreiro was indicted, but refused to appear in the court. He started a mutiny in Córdoba on April 14, rallying troops to support him. Three days later, Lieutenant Colonel Aldo Rico started another mutiny in Campo de Mayo, Buenos Aires, supporting Barreiro. They were called "Carapintadas" (Spanish: Painted faces) because they practiced military camouflage. They asked for new authorities in the armed forces, and an end to the dirty war related trials.

Loyal military units surrounded the rebels, but refused to attack them. The population made demonstrations in support of Alfonsín, and the CGT union called on a general strike on his behalf until the crisis was resolved. Other unions, political parties, industrial sectors and the Church manifested their support for Alfonsín as well.

Alfonsín personally led the negotiations with the rebels. The mutiny was stopped, and Alfonsín announced it in the balcony of the Casa Rosada, to the people gathered there. In the following weeks he made changes to the command of the armed forces, and sent the Law of Due Obedience bill to the Congress. This law, complementing the full stop law, prevented hundreds of prosecutions. The minister Horacio Jaunarena clarified that the law was a project previous to the mutiny, and that the new authorities in the armed forces were not the ones requested by Rico.

== Bibliography ==
- Lewis, Daniel (2015). The History of Argentina. United States: ABC Clio. ISBN 978-1-61069-860-3.
- Hedges, Jill (30 June 2011). Argentina: A Modern History. I.B.Tauris. ISBN 978-1-84885-654-7.
