= Germán López =

Germán López may refer to:

- Germán López (politician) (1919–1989), Argentine politician
- Germán López (tennis) (born 1971), Spanish tennis player
