= Roque Carranza =

Argentinian politician

Minister of Defense
- In office 27 May 1985 – 8 February 1986
- President: Raúl Alfonsín
- Preceded by: Raúl Borrás
- Succeeded by: Germán López

Minister of Public Works
- In office 10 December 1983 – 27 May 1985
- President: Raúl Alfonsín
- Preceded by: Conrado Bauer
- Succeeded by: Roberto Tomasini

Personal details
- Born: c. 1920-1921
- Died: 8 February 1986 (age 65) Campo de Mayo, Buenos Aires, Argentina
- Resting place: La Recoleta Cemetery; Buenos Aires, Argentina
- Party: Radical Civic Union

Roque Carranza (b. 1919 – d. 1986) was an Argentine politician, who served as minister of defense during the presidency of Raúl Alfonsín.
