= Lacau =

Lacau is a French surname. Notable people with the surname include:

- Georges Loustaunau-Lacau (1894–1955), French army officer and politician
- María Hortensia Lacau (1910-2006), Argentine pedagogue, writer, essayist, poet, educator
- Pierre Lacau (1873–1963), French Egyptologist and philologist
