= 1985 Argentine legislative election =

- 3 November 1985
- 127 of the 254 seats in the Chamber of Deputies
- Turnout: 83.77%
Party	Vote %	Seats	+/–
Radical Civic Union	43.58	65	+1
Justicialist Liberation Front	24.49	37	−19
Dissident Peronists	10.52	11	New
Intransigent Party	6.07	5	+3
Union of the Democratic Centre	3.72	2	+1
Democratic Progressive Party	1.24	1	+1
Autonomist–Liberal–Federal–PDP	1.13	2	+1
Democratic Party of Mendoza	0.62	1	+1
Salta Renewal Party	0.46	1	+1
Jujuy People's Movement	0.25	1	+1
Neuquén People's Movement	0.22	1	0
This lists parties that won seats. See the complete results below.
Results by province

Legislative elections were held in Argentina on 3 November 1985. Voters chose their legislators, with a turnout of 84%.

== Background ==
Raúl Alfonsín's 1983 inauguration had ushered in a new beginning for Argentina in significant ways, chief among them a new relationship between the Argentine military and government. Economic policy continued to dominate political dynamics, however, a concern exacerbated by the economic crisis inherited from the previous regime. The nation's leading labor union, the CGT, was close to the opposition Justicialist Party, and the tension between the CGT and Alfonsín so evident during 1984 (despite the President's populist early policies) turned to hostility after he replaced the pragmatic Minister of the Economy Bernardo Grinspun with the more conservative Juan Sourrouille in February 1985. Sorrouille curtailed his predecessor's wage indexation policy (amid 25% monthly inflation), leading to a sudden decline in real wages. Social discontent was compounded by military objections to sharp budget cutbacks, and bomb threats became frequent.

Fulfilling a 1983 campaign promise, Alfonsín reacted to military unwillingness to court-martial those guilty of Dirty War abuses (in which up to 30,000 mostly non-violent dissidents perished) by advancing a Trial of the Juntas, whose first hearings were held in April. This bold move was complemented by Sourrouille's June enactment of the Austral Plan, whose centerpiece, the Argentine austral would replace the worthless peso argentino at 1,000 to one. Inflation, which had reached 30% a month in June (1,130% for the year), fell to 2% by August and, though a wage freeze prevented real incomes from rising, these new inflation rates (the lowest since 1974) led to quick recovery from a sharp recession early in the year. Alfonsín enjoyed a 70% job approval rating by the time voters headed to the polls in early November, though he owed none of it to his economic policies, which were supported by only 30% of the public. The strong showing for Alfonsín's centrist UCR resulted, instead, from the Dirty War trial, a risky and daring initiative which had gathered international attention and was, by then, in its closing phase.

== Results ==
Party	Votes	%	Seats	
Party	Votes	%	Won	Total
Radical Civic Union	6,678,647	43.58	65	130
Justicialist Liberation Front	3,753,194	24.49	37	92
Dissident Peronists	1,611,441	10.52	11	11
Intransigent Party	930,940	6.07	5	6
Union of the Democratic Centre	570,490	3.72	2	3
People's Front	353,165	2.30	0	0
Federal Party	243,491	1.59	0	0
Socialist Unity	228,285	1.49	0	0
Democratic Progressive Party	190,329	1.24	1	1
Autonomist–Liberal–Federal–Democratic Progressive	172,470	1.13	2	3
Democratic Party of Mendoza	94,988	0.62	1	1
Salta Renewal Party	71,134	0.46	1	1
Christian Democratic Party	65,878	0.43	0	1
Blockist Party of San Juan	50,985	0.33	0	1
Workers' Party	46,817	0.31	0	0
Jujuy People's Movement	38,130	0.25	1	2
Humanist Party	36,002	0.23	0	0
Integration and Development Movement	35,168	0.23	0	0
Neuquén People's Movement	33,520	0.22	1	2
Chubut Action Party	20,537	0.13	0	0
Independent Democratic Alliance	17,237	0.11	0	0
Three Flags Party–Christian Democratic Party	11,653	0.08	0	0
Pampa Federalist Movement	11,394	0.07	0	0
Popular Line Movement	10,231	0.07	0	0
Center Party	7,595	0.05	0	0
Popular Left Front	5,717	0.04	0	0
Provincial Union	5,461	0.04	0	0
Autonomy and Sovereignty Party	4,062	0.03	0	0
Chaco Federalist Alliance	3,682	0.02	0	0
Fuegian People's Movement	3,582	0.02	0	0
Liberal Democratic Party	3,248	0.02	0	0
Democratic Party of Jujuy	2,842	0.02	0	0
Popular Action Movement	2,133	0.01	0	0
Patriotic Front	2,053	0.01	0	0
Frente Popular Federalista	1,573	0.01	0	0
Labor and People's Party	1,430	0.01	0	0
Autonomist Federal Pact	1,382	0.01	0	0
Authentic Socialist Party	1,336	0.01	0	0
Middle Generation Party	1,310	0.01	0	0
Nationalist Movement	780	0.01	0	0
National Popular Front	198	0.00	0	0
Total	15,324,510	100.00	127	254
Valid votes	15,324,510	98.07		
Invalid votes	96,353	0.62		
Blank votes	205,406	1.31		
Total votes	15,626,269	100.00		
Registered voters/turnout	18,653,487	83.77		
Source: Ministry of the Interior, DINE

=== Results by province ===
Province	UCR			FREJULI			Dissident Peronists			PI			Others		
Province	Votes	%	Seats	Votes	%	Seats	Votes	%	Seats	Votes	%	Seats	Votes	%	Seats
Buenos Aires	2,381,787	41.46	16	563,269	9.80	3	1,549,724	26.98	11	574,285	10.00	4	675,758	11.76	1
Buenos Aires City	848,123	42.90	7	498,320	25.21	4	20,075	1.02	0	155,720	7.88	1	454,633	23.00	1
Catamarca	57,807	50.77	2	49,831	43.77	1	2,156	1.89	0	1,267	1.11	0	2,790	2.45	0
Chaco	168,169	47.66	2	156,245	44.28	2	—	—	—	3,315	0.94	0	25,092	7.11	0
Chubut	53,501	43.34	1	43,587	35.31	1	—	—	—	1,987	1.61	0	24,367	19.74	0
Córdoba	743,958	52.37	5	506,235	35.64	4	—	—	—	54,551	3.84	0	115,804	8.15	0
Corrientes	87,791	25.07	1	68,047	19.43	0	10,684	3.05	0	—	—	—	183,642	52.44	2
Entre Ríos	243,820	46.61	3	207,878	39.74	2	—	—	—	24,184	4.62	0	47,182	9.02	0
Formosa	58,965	44.85	1	59,101	44.96	1	—	—	—	497	0.38	0	12,900	9.81	0
Jujuy	61,403	34.03	1	42,610	23.61	1	28,802	15.96	0	1,080	0.60	0	46,544	25.79	1
La Pampa	58,080	44.42	2	52,253	39.97	1	—	—	—	2,070	1.58	0	18,337	14.03	0
La Rioja	38,106	42.05	1	46,839	51.69	1	—	—	—	1,335	1.47	0	4,342	4.79	0
Mendoza	342,875	53.22	3	166,844	25.90	1	—	—	—	6,901	1.07	0	127,634	19.81	1
Misiones	144,209	54.63	2	102,632	38.88	1	—	—	—	3,037	1.15	0	14,090	5.34	0
Neuquén	48,294	39.92	1	28,595	23.63	1	—	—	—	2,472	2.04	0	41,627	34.41	1
Río Negro	85,097	53.11	1	45,042	28.11	1	—	—	—	11,946	7.46	0	18,154	11.33	0
Salta	109,799	35.02	1	108,060	34.47	1	—	—	—	1,514	0.48	0	94,138	30.03	1
San Juan	115,136	45.44	2	68,673	27.10	1	—	—	—	6,992	2.76	0	62,580	24.70	0
San Luis	61,028	47.99	2	57,735	45.40	1	—	—	—	1,942	1.53	0	6,476	5.09	0
Santa Cruz	23,967	47.97	2	19,713	39.46	1	—	—	—	1,212	2.43	0	5,070	10.15	0
Santa Fe	577,144	39.64	4	506,946	34.82	4	—	—	—	65,949	4.53	0	305,882	21.01	1
Santiago del Estero	132,389	49.16	2	124,073	46.07	1	—	—	—	3,519	1.31	0	9,321	3.46	0
Tierra del Fuego	4,674	30.17	1	5,416	34.96	1	—	—	—	793	5.12	0	4,611	29.76	0
Tucumán	232,525	45.46	2	225,250	44.04	2	—	—	—	4,372	0.85	0	49,314	9.64	0
Total	6,678,647	43.58	65	3,753,194	24.49	37	1,611,441	10.52	11	930,940	6.07	5	2,350,288	15.34	9
