= People's Front (Argentina) =

The People's Front (Spanish: Frente del Pueblo, abbreviated FREPU) was a political coalition in Argentina, formed ahead of the 1985 parliamentary election. FREPU consisted of the Communist Party of Argentina, Movement for Socialism and a small group of Peronist trade unionists. FREPU obtained around 350,000 votes.
