= Spring plan =

The Spring plan (Spanish: Plan primavera) was an Argentine economic plan designed during the presidency of Raúl Alfonsín.

== Development ==
Raúl Alfonsín began his presidency with a big economic crisis and high inflation. The Austral plan tried to fix it by placing limits on wages and prices and limiting money printing. The plan eventually failed as unions pressured for higher wages and businesspeople pressured for higher prices. The spring plan had similar goals and sought to keep the economy stable until the 1989 presidential elections. The new plan failed as well, causing an hyperinflation near the end of Alfonsín's presidency.

It was followed by the BONEX Plan, during the new Menem administration.
