= María Hortensia Lacau =

Argentine educator, writer (1910–2006)

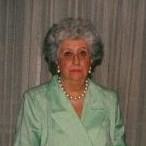
María Hortensia Lacau

María Hortensia Lacau (October 30, 1910 – January 12, 2006) was an Argentine pedagogue, writer, essayist, poet, and teacher. Dedicated to teaching and pedagogy, she was a teacher at the secondary, tertiary and university levels. She taught at Colegio Nacional de Buenos Aires and Escuela Superior de Comercio Carlos Pellegrini among other institutions. Lacau gave the chaired "Commentary on Texts" in the entrance courses of the Faculty of Philosophy and Letters of the University of Buenos Aires. She is the co-author of the "Lacau-Rosetti" Spanish Manuals with which several generations of Argentines studied Spanish and literature. She was a recipient of the Konex Award and the Illustrious Citizen of Buenos Aires award.

== Biography ==
María Hortensia Palisa Mujica de Lacau was born Buenos Aires, October 30, 1910. She received a national normal teacher education, and then graduated from the Joaquín V. González Superior National Teaching Staff as a teacher of Spanish literature.

She taught Spanish literature at the Colegio Nacional de Buenos Aires, the Escuela Superior de Comercio Carlos Pellegrini, the Escuela de Commerce No. 7 Manuel Belgrano, and at the San Martín General School of the National Board of the Blind. Between 1956 and 1960, she served as rector of the Normal School No. 4, a position she obtained by competition. At the University of Buenos Aires, she held the chair of Comentario de Texto in the course of admission to the Faculty of Philosophy and Letters.

Several generations of Argentine students and teachers benefited from her didactic and pedagogical work, including essays, textbooks and reading books. She edited and directed informative editions of numerous classical texts, and published pedagogical works such as Didáctica de la lectura creadora (1966, revised in 2002). Her most notable works for children are País de Silvia, Chingola y Hornerín, Yo y Hornerín, El libro de Juancito Maricaminero, El arbolito Serafín, Canciones de Guirigay, Casita busca dueño, Azulejo, El potrillo azul, Gris Buenos Aires, and the compilation Poemas para niños. Her complete published work totals around fifty titles.

Lacau frequently contributed to the newspaper La Prensa. She was also a contributor to the editorial activity of the Colección Grandes Obras de la Literatura Universal. Lacau was a member of the founding commission and served as president of Comité Asesor Promoción de la Literatura Infantil y Juvenil (CAPLI).

She created the "Banco de Tiempo" for the blind.

Lacau died in Buenos Aires, January 12, 2006.

== Awards and honours ==
In 1984, Lacau received the Konex Award for literatura for children. Due to her career and her contributions to literature and education, she was declared an Illustrious Citizen of Buenos Aires in 1995.
