= Antonio Mucci =

Argentine politician

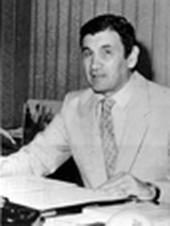
Antonio Mucci

Antonio Mucci was an Argentine politician, and Minister of Labor during the presidency of Raúl Alfonsín. He promoted a reduction of the influence of Peronism over the Argentine unions, and helped the President draft a bill for the Congress for that purpose. He resigned when the bill was rejected.

== Bibliography ==
- Tedesco, Laura (1999). Democracy in Argentina: Hope and Disillusion. United States: Frank Cass Publishers. p. 73. ISBN 978-0-714-64978-8.
