= Antonio Tróccoli =

Argentine politician

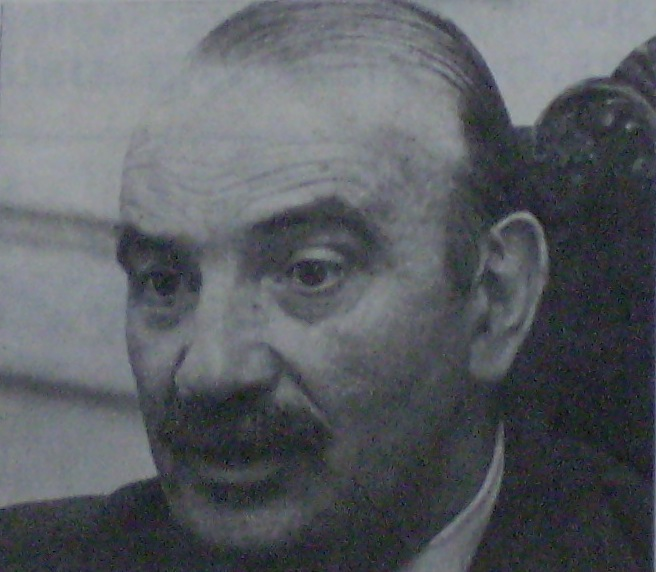
Antonio Tróccoli

Antonio Américo Tróccoli (21 February 1925 – 27 February 1995) was an Argentine politician. He served as Minister of Interior for president Raúl Alfonsín.
