= Illustrious Citizen of Buenos Aires =

Award given by the Buenos Aires city council

The Illustrious Citizen of Buenos Aires (Spanish: Ciudadano ilustre de la Ciudad Autónoma de Buenos Aires) is a recognition provided by the city of Buenos Aires, for people who made a fine work in culture, science, sports or politics. It is granted by the legislature of Buenos Aires, and must be approved by two thirds of the body. It can be received by either a native-born Porteño or by someone who has lived in Buenos Aires for at least 10 years.

It may not be received by people that committed crimes against humanity, or who took part in military dictatorships in Argentina.

== Notable people ==
- María Hortensia Lacau (1910–2006), Argentine pedagogue, writer, essayist, poet, educator
- Charly García (1952–), Argentine musician, considered to be the "Father of Argentine Rock"
