= 1987 Argentine legislative election =

- 6 September 1987
- 127 of the 254 seats in the Chamber of Deputies
- Turnout: 84.66%
Party	Vote %	Seats	+/–
Justicialist Party	41.29	60	+16
Radical Civic Union	37.24	52	−12
Union of the Democratic Centre	5.78	5	+4
Socialist Unity	1.63	1	+1
Democratic Progressive Party	1.37	1	+1
Autonomist–Liberal–PDP–MLP	1.04	2	+1
Provincial Action Front	0.61	1	New
Provincial Defence–White Flag	0.52	1	New
Salta Renewal Party	0.43	1	+1
Neuquén People's Movement	0.39	1	0
Blockist Alliance	0.37	1	0
Río Negro Provincial Party	0.24	1	New
This lists parties that won seats. See the complete results below.
Results by province

Legislative elections were held in Argentina on 6 September 1987. Voters chose their legislators and governors, with a turnout of 84%. The ruling Radical Civic Union lost their majority in the Chamber of Deputies.

== Background ==
The domestic and international esteem President Raúl Alfonsín earned for advancing the Trial of the Juntas suffered in December 1986, when on his initiative, Congress passed the Full Stop Law, which limited the civil trials against roughly 300 officers implicated in the 1976-79 Dirty War against dissidents to those indicted within 60 days of the law's passage, a tall order given the reluctance of many victims and witnesses to testify. These concessions did not placate hard-liners in the Argentine military who, though in a minority, put Argentina's hard-earned Democracy at risk in April 1987, when a group identified as Carapintadas ("painted faces," from their use of camouflage paint) loyal to Army Major Aldo Rico staged a mutiny of the important Army training base of Campo de Mayo during the Easter weekend. Negotiating in person with the rebels after four days of national suspense, Alfonsín secured their surrender, memorably announcing that "the house is in order."

The goodwill this earned Alfonsín and his centrist Radical Civic Union (UCR) began to erode when in June, Congress passed Alfonsín's Law of Due Obedience, granting immunity to officers implicated in crimes against humanity on the basis of "due obedience." This law, condemned by Amnesty International, among others, effectively halted most remaining prosecutions of Dirty War criminals.

The economy, too, became increasingly challenging. The 1985 Austral Plan had helped lead to a recovery in 1986; but frequent wage freezes ordered by the Economy Minister, Juan Sourrouille, kept real wages from rising, and GDP remained below its 1980 peak, in any case. A sharp fall in global commodity prices had evaporated the nation's US$4 billion trade surplus by 1987, and foreign debt interest payments could only be financed with more public debt, helping lead to a sudden halving of the value of the Argentine austral after May. Inflation (4% a month in May) rose to 14% in August, and though GDP grew modestly, real wages slid by around 8%.

Election night, September 6, dealt Alfonsín's UCR its sharpest blow among the nation's governors. The UCR lost 5 of its 7 governors elected in 1983, including the nation's most important: Governor Alejandro Armendáriz of the Province of Buenos Aires (home to 38% of Argentines). Armendáriz had been a key supporter of the President's Project Patagonia, which envisaged the transfer of the nation's capital from Buenos Aires to Viedma for the sake of decentralization. The project, which had been passed by the Lower House of Congress and had even received Pope John Paul II's personal blessing during an April 1987 state visit, had no future without an absolute UCR majority in the Lower House (the Senate - not in play in 1987 - was dominated by the Justicialist Party).

The loss of 13 UCR Congressmen benefited smaller, issue-oriented parties more than it did the Justicialists (whose gains were primarily among the governors, going from 12 to 17). The first to benefit in Congress was the conservative Union of the Democratic Centre (UCeDé), which ran on a free market platform calling for privatizations of an array of State enterprises, responsible for nearly half the nation's goods and services. These companies' losses, led by the Argentine Railways', were blamed by the UCeDé's leader, Alvaro Alsogaray, for the public sector cash flow problem and resulting financial instability (while disregarding the role of foreign debt interest payments). The UCeDé's gain of 4 Congressmen in these elections, though menial, portended the policy of "surgery without anesthetic" adopted by national policy makers in the 1990s.

== Results ==
Party	Votes	%	Seats	
Party	Votes	%	Won	Total
Justicialist Party	6,622,252	41.29	60	108
Radical Civic Union	5,972,588	37.24	52	118
Union of the Democratic Centre	926,988	5.78	5	7
Intransigent Party	327,103	2.04	0	5
Socialist Unity	261,510	1.63	1	1
Movimiento al Socialismo	229,623	1.43	0	0
Broad Liberation Front	228,008	1.42	0	0
Democratic Progressive Party	219,688	1.37	1	2
Autonomist–Liberal–PDP–MLP	166,746	1.04	2	4
Integration and Development Movement	155,932	0.97	0	0
Democratic Party of Mendoza	99,749	0.62	0	1
Provincial Action Front	98,249	0.61	1	1
White Party of Retirees	89,319	0.56	0	0
Provincial Defence–White Flag	83,592	0.52	1	1
Salta Renewal Party	68,719	0.43	1	2
Neuquén People's Movement	61,859	0.39	1	2
Blockist Alliance	59,131	0.37	1	1
Workers' Party	42,732	0.27	0	0
Renewal Front	41,433	0.26	0	0
Popular Union	38,839	0.24	0	0
Río Negro Provincial Party	38,150	0.24	1	1
Renewal Unit Movement	27,611	0.17	0	0
Conservative Autonomist Party	24,434	0.15	0	0
Labor and People's Party	24,270	0.15	0	0
Patriotic Liberation Movement	18,784	0.12	0	0
Christian Democratic Party	15,241	0.10	0	0
Democracy and Participation Front	12,854	0.08	0	0
Chubut Action Party	11,041	0.07	0	0
Social Republican Party	10,395	0.06	0	0
Patriotic Alliance	10,109	0.06	0	0
Alliance Labor Confederation	8,551	0.05	0	0
Three Flags Renewal Party	7,691	0.05	0	0
Independent Action Alliance	4,387	0.03	0	0
Front for Change	4,307	0.03	0	0
Federalist Renewal Movement	3,896	0.02	0	0
Autonomy and Sovereignty Party	3,729	0.02	0	0
Conservative People's Party	2,802	0.02	0	0
Chaco Alliance	2,707	0.02	0	0
Social Justice	1,647	0.01	0	0
Popular Alliance	1,608	0.01	0	0
Tradition and Coherence	1,491	0.01	0	0
Federal Party	1,405	0.01	0	0
Autonomous Party	1,396	0.01	0	0
Mobilization	1,345	0.01	0	0
Alternative of Change	919	0.01	0	0
Christian Socialist Alliance	720	0.00	0	0
Liberation Party	664	0.00	0	0
Authentic Socialist Party	490	0.00	0	0
Popular Line Movement	339	0.00	0	0
Nationalist Movement	316	0.00	0	0
Democratic Party of La Rioja	293	0.00	0	0
Total	16,037,652	100.00	127	254
Valid votes	16,037,652	97.54		
Invalid votes	77,241	0.47		
Blank votes	326,959	1.99		
Total votes	16,441,852	100.00		
Registered voters/turnout	19,420,204	84.66		
Source: Ministry of the Interior, DINE

=== Results by province ===
Province	PJ			UCR			UCEDE			Others		
Province	Votes	%	Seats	Votes	%	Seats	Votes	%	Seats	Votes	%	Seats
Buenos Aires	2,706,508	45.08	18	2,254,196	37.55	15	377,074	6.28	2	665,357	11.08	0
Buenos Aires City	477,617	23.93	3	779,399	39.06	6	362,739	18.18	3	375,878	18.84	0
Catamarca	66,405	54.09	1	50,664	41.27	1	1,054	0.86	0	4,639	3.78	0
Chaco	190,000	49.85	2	174,642	45.82	1	—	—	—	16,486	4.33	0
Chubut	58,262	44.69	2	48,754	37.40	1	2,366	1.81	0	20,993	16.10	0
Córdoba	649,861	43.89	4	692,876	46.80	5	61,784	4.17	0	76,137	5.14	0
Corrientes	67,717	18.02	1	93,828	24.97	1	7,550	2.01	0	206,670	55.00	2
Entre Ríos	264,436	48.45	2	232,748	42.64	2	19,198	3.52	0	29,441	5.39	0
Formosa	74,565	50.69	2	71,151	48.37	1	—	—	—	1,389	0.94	0
Jujuy	82,605	42.53	2	70,393	36.24	1	1,987	1.02	0	39,259	20.21	0
La Pampa	73,924	53.63	1	58,286	42.28	1	—	—	—	5,634	4.09	0
La Rioja	59,292	60.86	2	32,892	33.76	1	491	0.50	0	4,743	4.87	0
Mendoza	315,216	46.20	3	243,321	35.66	2	5,037	0.74	0	118,679	17.40	0
Misiones	140,497	47.97	2	134,559	45.95	2	8,918	3.05	0	8,891	3.04	0
Neuquén	14,863	10.94	0	39,645	29.18	1	1,703	1.25	0	79,635	58.62	1
Río Negro	61,674	34.20	1	68,404	37.94	1	3,737	2.07	0	46,494	25.79	1
Salta	180,984	51.96	2	93,228	26.76	1	—	—	—	74,128	21.28	1
San Juan	112,259	43.57	2	49,450	19.19	0	19,758	7.67	0	76,206	29.57	1
San Luis	69,078	51.35	1	44,775	33.29	1	8,546	6.35	0	12,115	9.01	0
Santa Cruz	28,136	49.54	1	26,653	46.93	1	—	—	—	2,000	3.52	0
Santa Fe	640,484	42.21	5	408,370	26.91	3	34,992	2.31	0	433,643	28.58	2
Santiago del Estero	152,368	50.60	2	128,003	42.51	2	2,048	0.68	0	18,675	6.20	0
Tucumán	135,501	26.13	1	176,351	34.01	2	8,006	1.54	0	198,732	38.32	2
Total	6,622,252	41.29	60	5,972,588	37.24	52	926,988	5.78	5	2,515,824	15.69	10
