= Raúl Borrás =

Argentinian politician

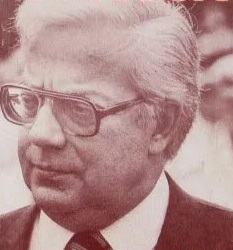
Raúl Borrás

Raúl Borrás (1933–1985) was an Argentine politician, who served as minister of defense during the first years of the presidency of Raúl Alfonsín. He served as minister from December 10, 1983 till May 25, 1985.
