= Rodrigazo =

Passersby on Buenos Aires' Florida Street gaze at damage left by striking graphic-design workers at La Nación.

Rodrigazo is the name given to a group of economic policies announced in Argentina on June 4, 1975 and the riots that ensued thereafter. The name is from the fact that the policies were announced and implemented by Celestino Rodrigo, the Minister of Economy of Argentina appointed by President Isabel Perón in May 1975. The Rodrigazo fractured the prime bulwark of Peronist support, labor unions, and is held to have helped lead to Isabel Perón's downfall less than a year later.

== Summary ==
- A 150% devaluation of currency for the commercial exchange rate.
- A 100% increase in utility and transportation prices.
- A 180% rise in the price of fuel.
- A 45% increase in wages.

== Etymology ==
The term derives from the surname of an Argentine Minister of Economy who briefly held that post in 1975, Celestino Rodrigo, plus the augmentative suffix "-azo". In the newspaper La Prensa of 6 June 1975 it is mentioned (under the title New Term) that, in the session of the Chamber of Deputies of 5 June 1975, the national deputy of Vanguardia Federal from the province of Tucumán, Juan Carlos Cárdenas, spoke about the management of Minister Celestino Rodrigo and described it as "Rodrigazo".

== Background ==
The Argentine Minister of Economy under President Cámpora in 1973 was José Ber Gelbard, a Polish immigrant, businessman, with close ties to the Communist Party, founder of the General Economic Confederation (CGE), and a trusted associate of Perón. Gelbard implemented a Keynesian plan to increase real wages in order to strengthen the domestic market.

Gelbard hoped to save his plan by signing trade agreements with socialist countries in Eastern Europe and China. To that end, he toured the region and signed several agreements. However, in a world polarized by the Cold War, this attempt faced insurmountable political obstacles. One example was the United States' blockade of the sale to Cuba of cars manufactured by U.S. companies in Argentina. The only result of these approaches to socialist bloc countries was a loan granted by Perón on 28 August 1973; the credit amounted to $1.2 billion in favor of Cuba. The credit was never repaid and seriously weakened the reserves of the Central Bank of Argentina.

== Presidency of Isabel Perón and the Rodrigazo ==
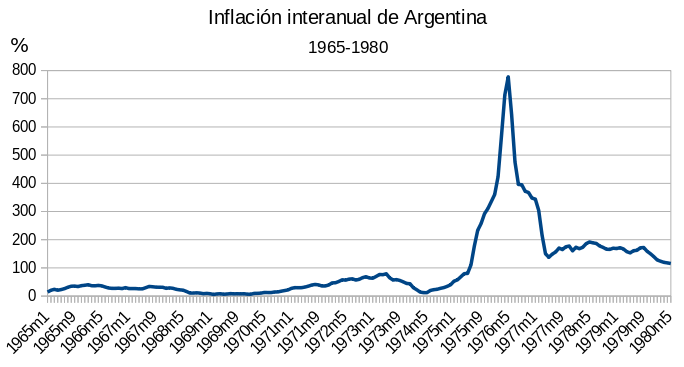
Annualized inflation from selected months between 1965 and 1980.

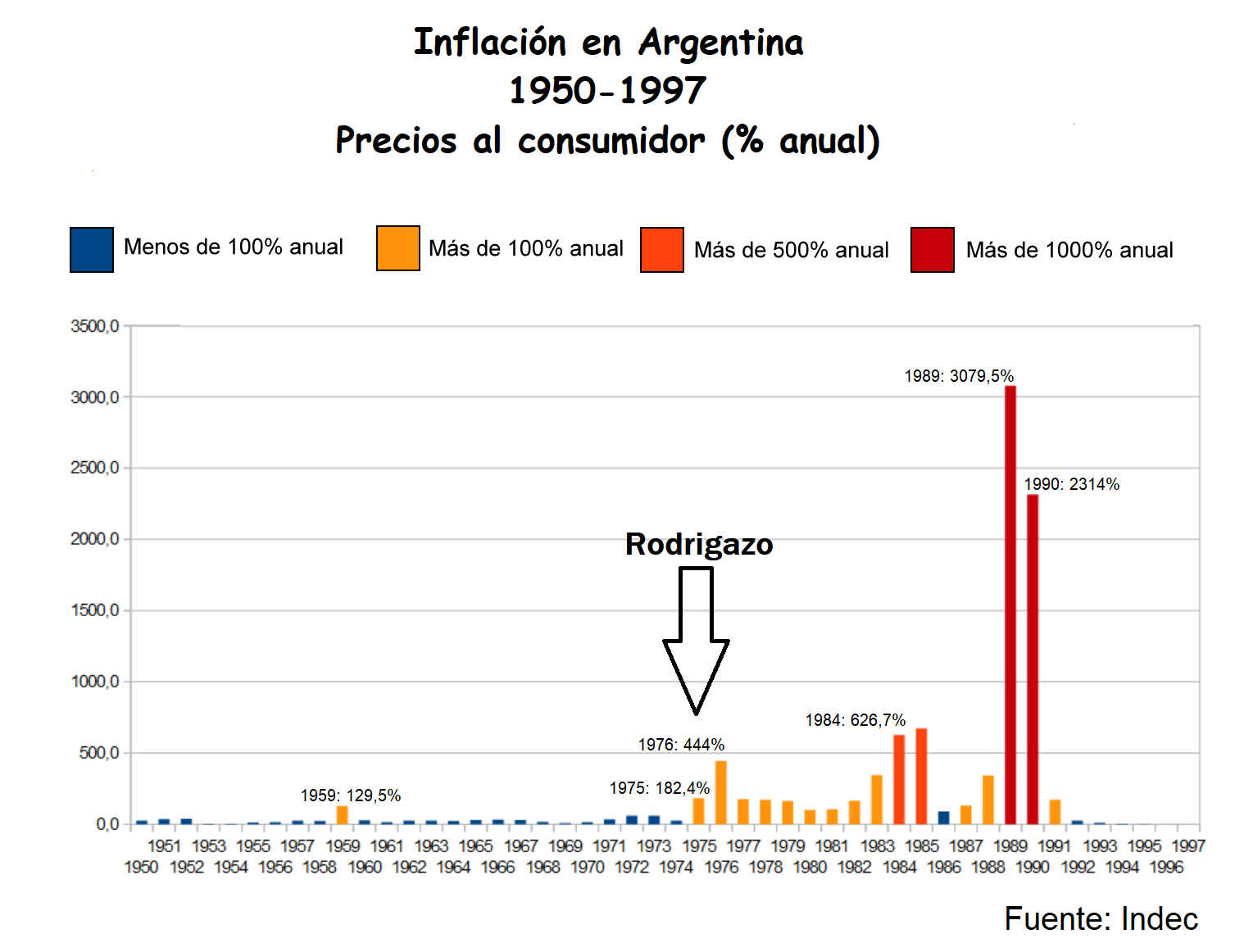
The Rodrigazo marked the beginning of a period of very high inflation rates, exceeding 100%, which lasted for 16 years, until 1990.

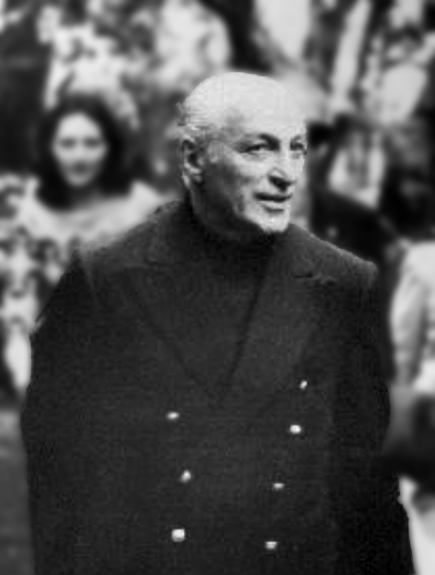
The massive general strike of 7–8 July by the CGT against the Rodrigazo led to the fall of Minister López Rega, associated with the Propaganda Due lodge and head of the Triple A, who was forced to resign and flee the country.

In 1975, Celestino Rodrigo assumed office as Minister of Economy with a shock economic policy. The official arguments were the need to reduce the existing public deficit and increase business productivity through a devaluation of the peso. According to Ricardo Zinn, there was a "war" over income distribution. The plan sought to address rising inflation, which Martínez de Hoz attributed to monetary issuance carried out by Gelbard during the 1973–1974 period.

The shock became known as the "Rodrigazo" and involved a 160% devaluation of the peso and increases in tariffs and fuel prices of up to 180%. Its objective was to move prices ahead of wages, eroding corporate debts, and then stabilize and liberalize the economy for the entry of foreign capital.

The economic plan also set a cap of 40% on wage increases agreed in collective bargaining. For trade unions, which had agreed with employers on wage increases averaging double that cap, the Rodrigazo was a declaration of war.

In May 1975, a major tax reform was announced that eliminated smaller provincial taxes and reduced the IV (value tax, predecessor to the VAT) from 14.5% to 7.5% on sales of mass-consumption goods (clothing, fuel, food, appliances, etc.), and a reduced IV of 5% for essential products (such as food and medicine).

Rodrigo made a televised appeal to the country to accept his plan, which had no effect. On 21 July 1975 he resigned, along with his deputy Ricardo Zinn.

Trade unions rejected the government's proposals, which limited wage increases in collective bargaining to 38% and then 40%. The CGT attempted to negotiate a higher wage increase, which, due to massive worker mobilization, led to the first strike against a Peronist administration (48 hours), and ultimately an average wage increase of 180% was agreed, much of which was eroded by inflation.

== Aftermath ==
Afterward, the real wage (the purchasing power of the wage) fell, as prices overall doubled between May and August alone and continued to fall until well into 1979. The crisis had political consequences, but not all were negative. Blindsided by the draconian measure, the normally supportive CGT (the largest labor union in Latin America, at the time), called a general strike – the first ever under a Peronist government. Demanding a 125-150% mandatory wage hike, the CGT initially obtained Mrs. Perón's commitment to its enactment. As they gathered at Plaza de Mayo on June 27 in gratitude for her concession, however, the president abruptly reneged on her commitment. This sent the demonstrators into a riot directed at Rodrigo's benefactor José López Rega, the powerful Social Welfare Minister, leader of the Argentine Anticommunist Alliance, and Perón family confidant. The president had the Triple A death squad leader Rega flee Argentina by appointing him Ambassador to Spain on July 11. She then removed Rodrigo, the Armed Forces Commander, General Alberto Numa Laplane, and numerous other López Rega protégés.

On 11 August 1975, Antonio Cafiero assumed office as minister, but failed to alter the catastrophic course of the economy, aggravated by the increasingly overt operations of coup-plotting groups. By the end of the year, the public deficit reached 12.4%, all social indicators deteriorated rapidly, and the inflation rate rose from 24.4% in 1974 to 182.4% in 1975 and 444% in 1976.

According to economist Guillermo Calvo, the economic turmoil that followed the Rodrigazo, including an inflation rate of around 35% a month, was one of the main reasons for the March 1976 coup that removed the Peronist government.
