= 1989 riots in Argentina =

The 1989 riots were a series of riots and related episodes of looting in stores and supermarkets in Argentina, during the last part of the presidency of Raúl Alfonsin, between May and June 1989. The riots were caused by the rampant hyperinflation and food shortage, and were associated with legal protests and demonstrations

The first riots started in Rosario, the third-largest city in the country, when people demanded supermarkets give away food; they quickly spread to other cities, especially in Greater Buenos Aires. The national government established a state of emergency. More than 40 people were arrested, and there were 14 dead (20 according to unofficial reports). Eventually President Alfonsín resigned, and president elect Carlos Menem took office six months in advance, in July.

== Build-up ==
In August 1988, the Alfonsín government launched a new economic plan, called Plan Primavera, intended to contain inflation. It included price controls, negotiated with 53 leading companies, and exchange rate controls, the freezing of state workers' wages, and negotiations with the labour unions. The plan soon proved a failure. Interest rates rose uncontrollably, and the Central Bank's foreign currency reserves were depleted, as it sold U.S. dollars to preserve the value of the Argentine austral. The economic establishment withdrew deposits from the banks, withheld the dollars brought in by exports, and purposefully delayed the paying of taxes.

During May 1989, the exchange rate (while fixed in theory) rose from 80 to 200 australes to the dollar. In Rosario, the inflation rate of May reached 96.5%. There was a shortage of basic products in supermarkets and stores, and their price tags were updated several times in the same day.

The results of the general elections held on 14 May 1989 were overwhelmingly favourable to the Justicialist Party. The volatile situation prompted talks about the possibility of anticipating the assumption of the president elect. In Rosario, mayor Horacio Usandizaga resigned, fulfilling a promise that he would leave office if Menem got elected.

Wednesday, 24 May was a bank holiday. The first isolated riots erupted in Rosario and Córdoba. On 28 May the president announced an emergency economic plan. That night the riots and episodes of looting became generalized in Rosario, especially in the southern neighbourhoods, where most of the larger supermarkets were concentrated at the time, and the next day they spread to the nearby industrial corridor and other cities, accompanied in certain cases by road blockades and cacerolazos.

== The riots in Rosario ==
The rioters broke into supermarkets, food stores and smaller businesses, in groups of varying size (as small as 20 people and as large as 1,000). In most cases they were young, and included a significant proportion of women and children, who doubled as willing human shields against the police. Though most were motivated by hunger and took only food, many also stole cash registers, furniture, refrigerators, etc. Common robbers as well as ostensibly middle-class people could be found among the crowd, as well as people who loaded stolen merchandise on cars and other motor vehicles. The violence was directed at the businesses, not the people, although there were some isolated incidents of owners being hurt or hurting others when trying to defend their shops, and attacks on some police stations.

Police action was rather passive during the first two days, which contributed to the generalization of the riots. Whether they were overwhelmed by its massive dimensions is a matter of discussion; some hypotheses point to orders from a faction of the provincial government. Some neighbours claimed that the police were merely "guarding" the robbers, as the security forces only shot some rounds into the air, and few arrests were made.

This changed on 29 May, when the president declared a state of emergency for 30 days. The city was militarized and divided into three operational areas. School classes were suspended, banks were closed, public transportation was shut down, and a curfew was imposed.

By the beginning of June the riots ceased, as the situation was controlled by the security forces and the municipal and national governments began to deliver food assistance. The national government also ordered the creation of hundreds of soup kitchens.

== Riots in 1990 ==
The beginning of 1990 saw a new, albeit much smaller wave of riots, mainly February and March, in Rosario and Greater Buenos Aires. The economic crisis had not abated, and many businesses had resumed operating with physical barriers. The riots were contained quickly, again with delivery of food assistance to the poorer neighbourhoods.

== See also ==
- December 2001 riots (Argentina)
- List of food riots
