= Germán López (politician) =

Argentine politician

Germán Osvaldo López (1919 – 1989) was an Argentine politician who served as minister of defense of Raúl Alfonsín.
