= Bernardo Grinspun =

Argentinian politician

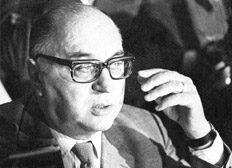

Minister of the Economy
- In office December 10, 1983 – February 18, 1985
- President: Raúl Alfonsín
- Preceded by: Jorge Wehbe
- Succeeded by: Juan Vital Sourrouille

Personal details
- Born: December 23, 1925 Argentina
- Died: October 11, 1996 (aged 70) Buenos Aires, Argentina
- Party: Radical Civic Union
- Education: University of Buenos Aires

Bernardo Grinspun (December 23, 1925 – October 11, 1996) was an Argentine economist. He was the minister of economy of Raúl Alfonsín. He was appointed in 1983, and resigned in 1985.
