= Horacio Jaunarena =

Argentine politician

José Horacio Jaunarena (born 29 November 1942) is an Argentine politician who served as minister of defense in the cabinet of Raúl Alfonsín.
