= Juan Vital Sourrouille =

Argentine economist (1940–2021)

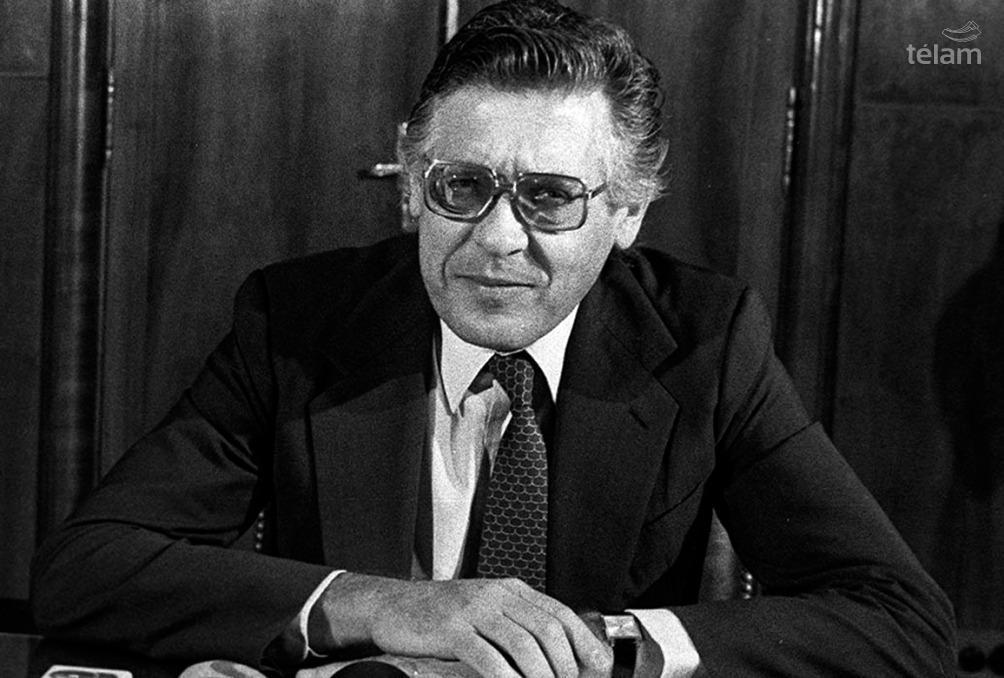
Juan Vital Sourrouille

Juan Vital Sourrouille (13 August 1940 – 21 July 2021) was an Argentine economist. He is the author of El Complejo Automotor en Argentina.

Sourrouille was born in Buenos Aires. He was the Minister of Economy of Argentina during the government of Raúl Alfonsín (1985–1989). He fathered the Austral plan. Sourrouille died on 21 July 2021, in Buenos Aires, aged 80.
