= Economic history of Argentina =

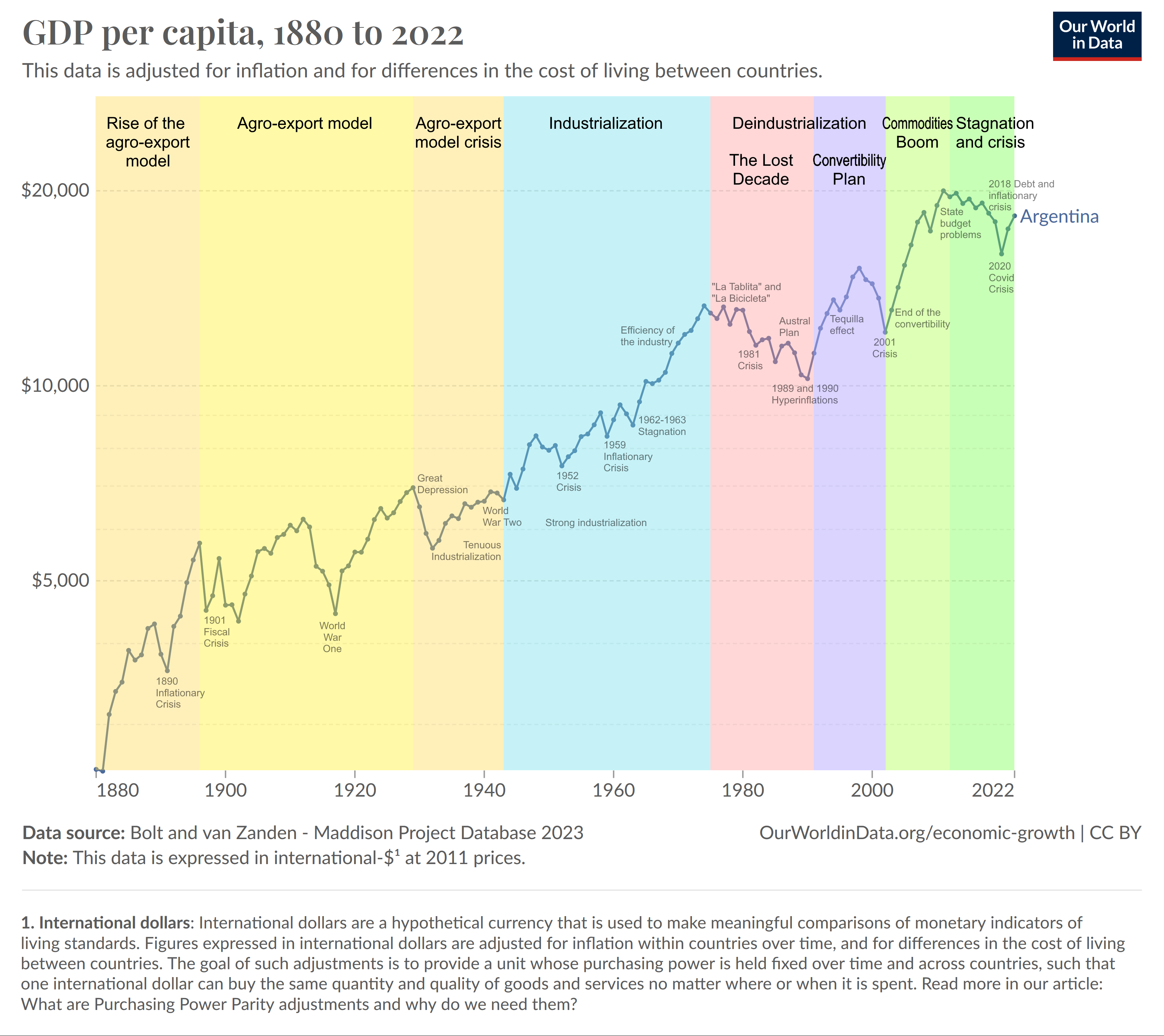
Historical development of GDP per capita

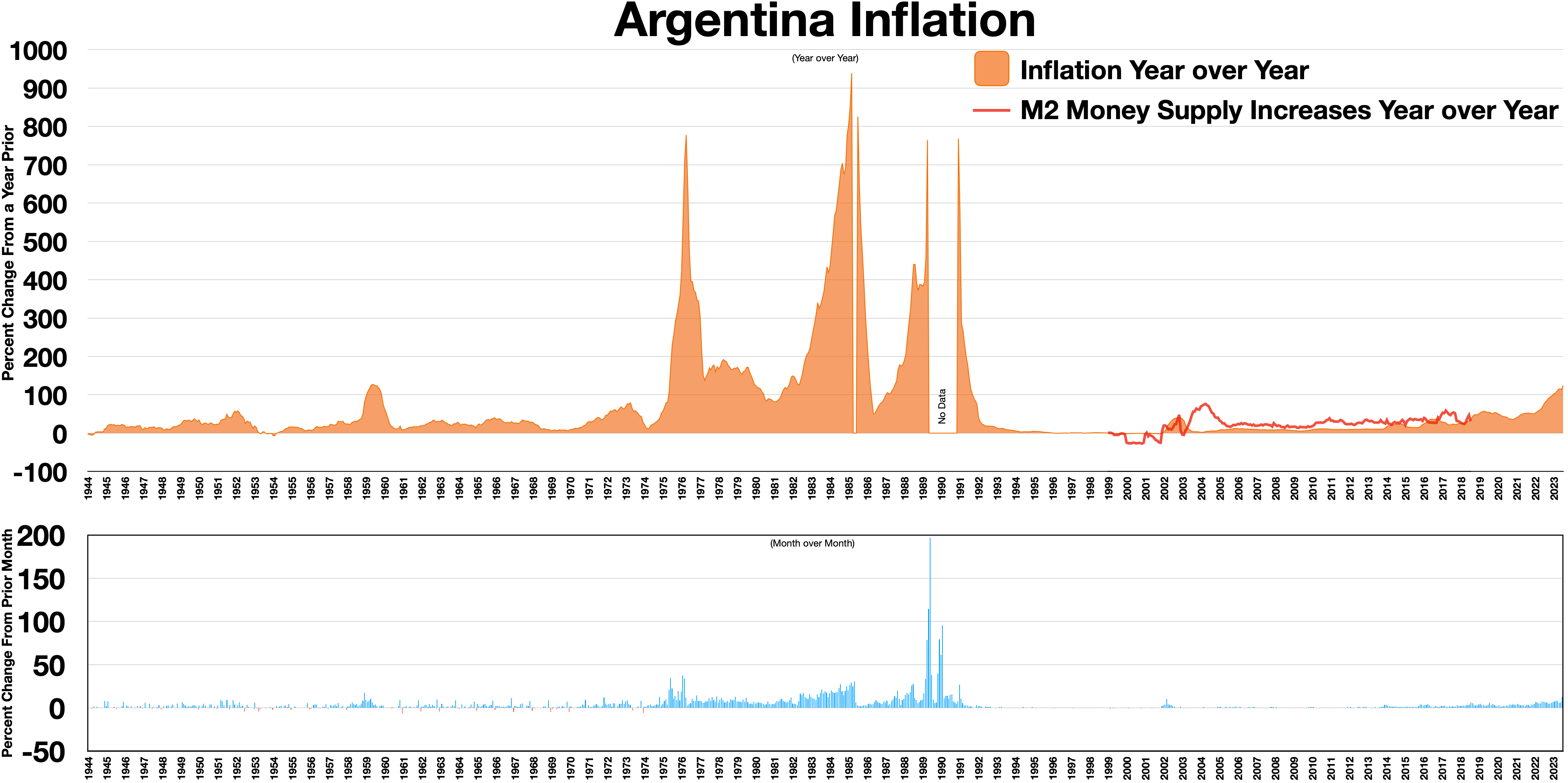
Argentina Inflation Year over Year inflation M2 money supply increases Year over Year Month over Month inflation

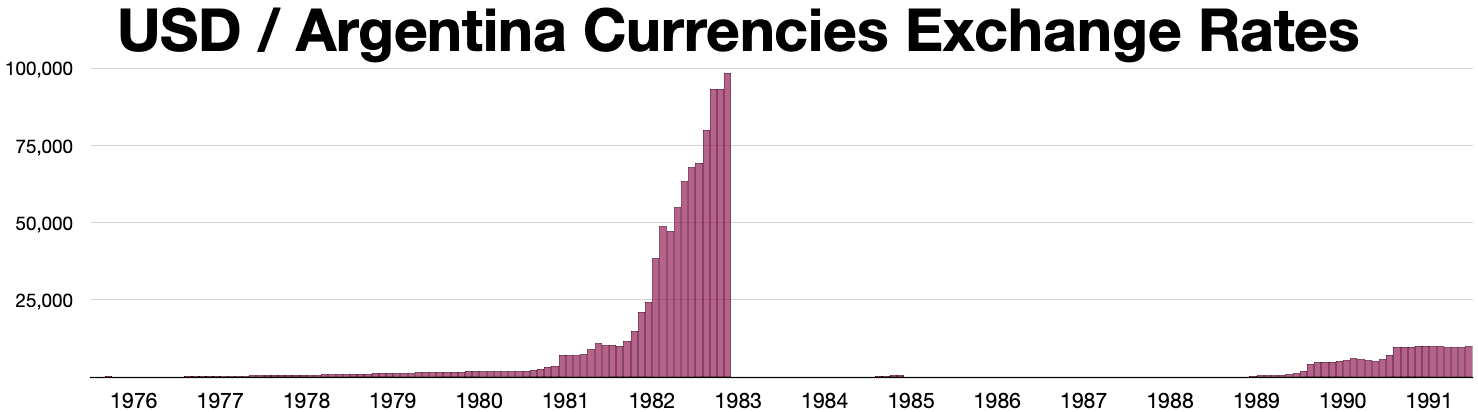
USD / Argentina Currency Exchange Rates

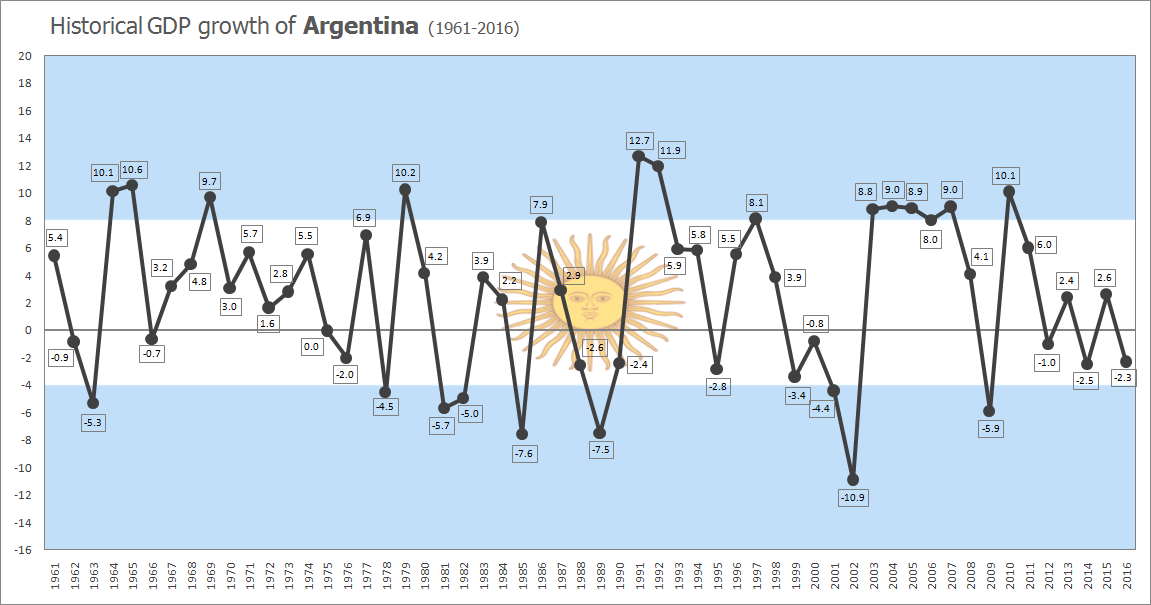
Evolution of GDP growth

The economic history of Argentina is one of the most studied, owing to the "Argentine paradox". As a country, it had achieved advanced development in the early 20th century but experienced a reversal relative to other developed economies, which inspired an enormous wealth of literature and diverse analysis on the causes of this relative decline. Since independence from Spain in 1816, the country has defaulted on its debt nine times. Inflation has often risen to the double digits, even as high as 5,000%, resulting in several large currency devaluations.

Argentina possesses definite comparative advantages in agriculture because the country is endowed with a vast amount of highly fertile land. Between 1860 and 1930, exploitation of the rich land of the pampas strongly pushed economic growth. During the first three decades of the 20th century, Argentina outgrew Canada and Australia in population, total income, and per capita income. By 1913, Argentina was among the world's ten wealthiest states per capita.

Beginning in the 1930s, the Argentine economy deteriorated notably. The single most important factor in this decline has been political instability since 1930 when a military junta took power, ending seven decades of civilian constitutional government. In macroeconomic terms, Argentina was one of the most stable and conservative countries until the Great Depression, after which it turned into one of the most unstable. Despite this, up until 1962, the Argentine per capita GDP was higher than that of Austria, Italy, Japan, and of its former colonial master, Spain. Successive governments from the 1930s to the 1970s pursued a strategy of import substitution to achieve industrial self-sufficiency, but the government's encouragement of industrial growth diverted investment from agricultural production, which fell dramatically.

The era of import substitution ended in 1976, but at the same time growing government spending, large wage increases, and inefficient production created a chronic inflation that rose through the 1980s. The measures enacted during the last dictatorship also contributed to the huge foreign debt by the late 1980s which became equivalent to three-fourths of the GNP.

In the early 1990s, the government reined in inflation by implementing a currency board system and introducing a new convertible peso equal in value to the U.S. dollar and privatized numerous state-run companies using part of the proceeds to reduce the national debt. However, a sustained recession at the turn of the 21st century culminated in a default, and the government again devalued the peso. By 2005 the economy had recovered, but the country again defaulted in 2014 and 2020.

== Colonial economy ==
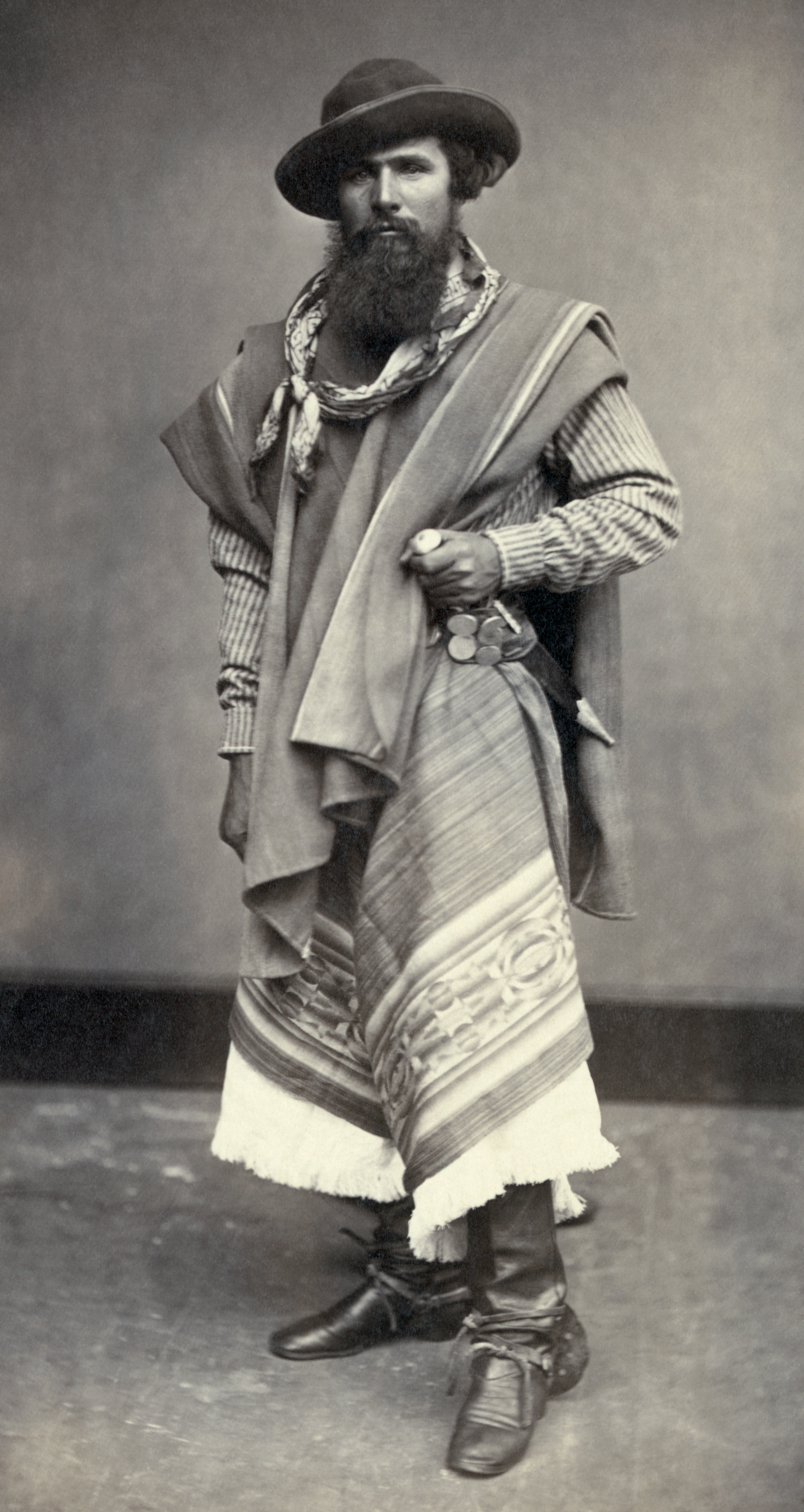
An 1868 photo of a gaucho. Gauchos helped livestock ranching extend through much of Argentina.

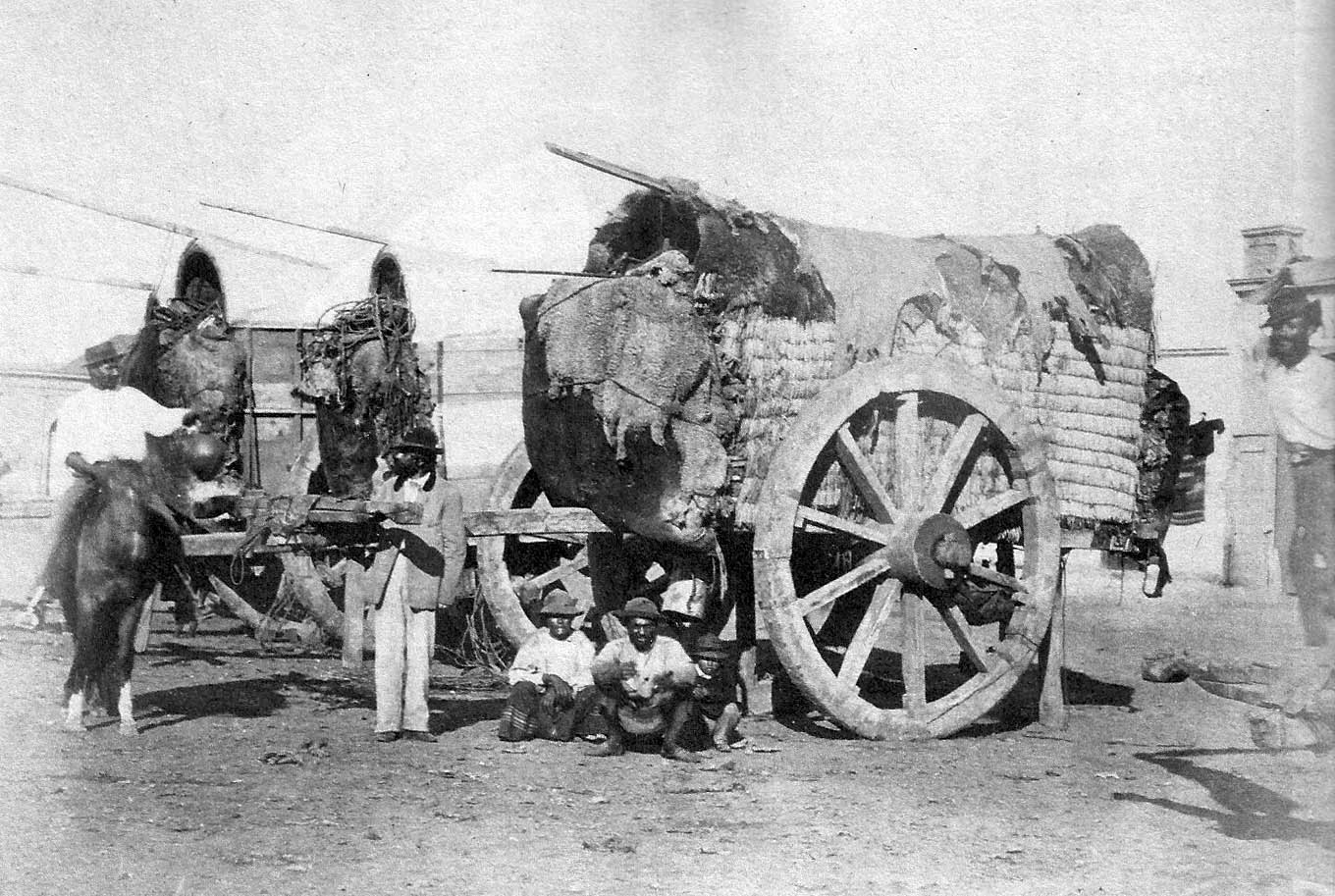
Field wagons ("carretas") were introduced by the Spaniards at the end of the 16th century as transport for passengers and goods.

During the colonial period, present-day Argentina offered fewer economic advantages compared to other parts of the Spanish Empire, which caused it to assume a peripheral position within the Spanish colonial economy. It lacked deposits of gold or other precious metals and did not have established native civilizations to subject to the encomienda.

Only two-thirds of its present territory were occupied during the colonial period, while the remaining third consisted of the Patagonian Plateau which remains sparsely populated to this day. The agricultural and livestock sector's output was principally consumed by the producers themselves and by the small local market. They only became associated with foreign trade towards the end of the 18th century.

The period between the 16th and the end of the 18th century was characterized by self-sufficient regional economies separated by considerable distances, a lack of road, maritime or river communications, and the hazards of land transport. By the end of the 18th century, a significant national economy came into being as Argentina developed a market in which reciprocal flows of capital, labor, and goods could take place on a significant scale between its regions.

In the colonial period, the territories that now make up Argentina were subject, like the rest of the Spanish territories in the Americas, to legal restrictions regarding how and with whom trade could be conducted. Throughout the 17th and 18th centuries, trade directly through the port of Buenos Aires, rather than via the official system of fleets out of the port of Lima in modern Perú, was forbidden except through special permission from the Crown. In practice, however, this did not mean that the colonial economy of what is now Argentina was closed to trade.

In addition to trade with Brazil and Guinea, which was legalized in the early seventeenth century, colonial Buenos Aires also conducted trade directly with Spain and other European powers through the so-called navíos de registro— ships with royal permission to sail outside the official fleet or Spanish treasure fleet system to conduct specific services, such as transport soldiers. Dutch and Basque merchants in particular played an important role, in partnership, in managing the system of navíos de registro to conduct trans-Atlantic trade with Buenos Aires. Even more important than the navíos was a system of contraband trade into which the navíos were inserted. Thus, in the second half of the seventeenth century an estimated 200 ships entered the port of Buenos Aires without any permission at all, as opposed to 34 navíos de registro. On top of this system of largely technically illegal transatlantic trade was the situado system of funding from the royal treasury in Potosí, in Upper Peru, which supplied the military garrison in Buenos Aires. In practice, the situado funded, through a system of credit, a local economy in Buenos Aires which was itself inserted into the contraband economy.

Argentinian historian Zacarías Moutoukias argues that this system of trade, in which Buenos Aires was linked with the mining economy of the Andes through the situado and to cross-Atlantic trade through contraband and the navíos de registro, created an integrated political and commercial elite in Buenos Aires, made up of military officers, Crown officials and local merchants, and a political economy in which "corruption"—that is, the violation of royal laws regarding trade—was not an aberration but rather a defining characteristic. For Moutoukias, "corruption" was simply "the violation of a fixed set of norms that limited the integration of the crown’s representatives with the local oligarchy"—a violation that was tacitly tolerated by the Crown because it was lucrative.

Historians like Milcíades Peña consider this historical period of the Americas as pre-capitalist, as most production of the coastal cities was destined to overseas markets. Rodolfo Puiggrós consider it instead a feudalist society, based on work relations such as the encomienda or slavery. Norberto Galasso and Enrique Rivera consider that it was neither capitalist nor feudalist, but a hybrid system result of the interaction of the Spanish civilization, on the transition from feudalism to capitalism, and the natives, still living in prehistory.

The Argentine territories, held back by their closed economies, the lack of any activity closely linked to foreign trade, and the scant amounts of labor and capital they consequently received, fell far behind those of other areas of the colonial world that participated in foreign trade. Only activities associated with a dynamic exporting centre enjoyed some degree of prosperity, as occurred in Tucuman, where cloth was manufactured, and in Córdoba and the Litoral, where livestock was raised to supply the mines of Upper Peru.

This trade was legally limited to Spain: the Spanish Crown enforced a monopsony which limited supplies and enabled Spanish merchants to mark up prices and increase profits. British and Portuguese merchants broke this monopsony by resorting to contraband trade.

Other scholars reject the label of "feudal" to describe Argentine economy and society during the colonial period. Historian Jeremy Adelman, for example, describes an agrarian economy in the Argentinian interior in which both wage labor and production for the market were quite common during the colonial period. In the seventeenth century, this included the development of textile workshops (obrajes), the raising of mules for transport and the hunting of feral cattle herds to produce meat, leather and tallow— all of these economic activities supplied the mining economy of Potosí in the Andes. In the 18th century, the depletion of feral cattle herds led to the development of settled livestock agriculture in the Argentine Littoral and inland regions. The relative lack of extra-economic coercion due to ample access to land on the agrarian frontier, the prevalence of wage labor, the variety of types of land tenure (ownership, tenancy, a spectrum of usufruct rights) as well as a lack of a fixed and hegemonic landed elite all lead Adelman to reject the label of "feudalism" to describe the agrarian economy of what now makes up Argentina during the colonial period.

The British desire to trade with South America grew during the Industrial Revolution and the loss of their 13 colonies in North America during the American Revolution. To achieve their economic objectives, Britain initially launched the British invasions of the Río de la Plata to conquer key cities in Spanish America but they were defeated by the local forces of what is now Argentina and Uruguay not once but twice without the help of Spain. When they allied to Spain during the Napoleonic Wars, they requested the Spanish authorities to open commerce to Britain in return.

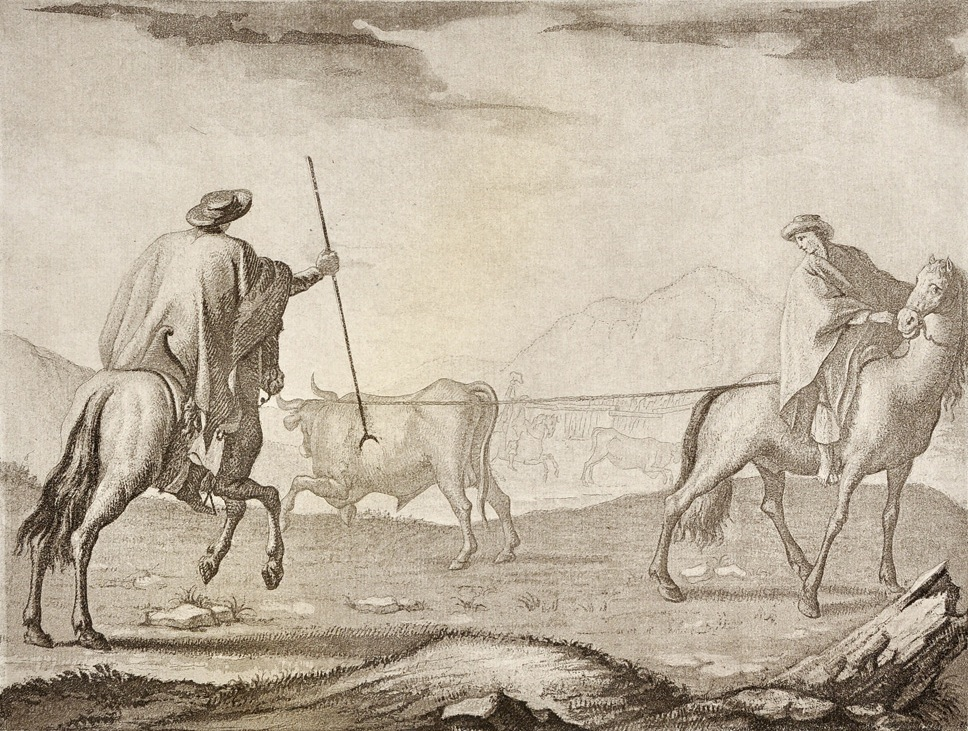
Lassoing cattle in the pampas, 1794 lithography by Fernando Brambilla.

The first Argentine historians, such as Bartolomé Mitre, attributed the free trade to The Representation of the Hacendados economic report by Mariano Moreno, but is currently considered the result of a general negotiation between Britain and Spain, as reflected in the Apodaca-Canning treaty of 1809. The actions of Baltasar Hidalgo de Cisneros in Buenos Aires reflected similar outcomes emanating from the other Spanish cities of South America.

Compared to other parts of Latin America, slavery played a much lesser role in the development of the Argentine economy, mostly because of the absence of gold mines and sugar plantations, which would have demanded huge numbers of slave workers. Colonial Brazil, for example, imported as many as 2.5 million Africans in the 18th century. By contrast, an estimated 100,000 African slaves arrived at the port of Buenos Aires in the 17th and 18th centuries, and many were destined for Paraguay, Chile and Bolivia.

The colonial livestock ranches were established toward the middle of the 18th century. The pace of growth in the region increased dramatically with the establishment in 1776 of the new Viceroyalty of Rio de la Plata with Buenos Aires as its capital, and increased legal trading allowed by the Free Trade Act of 1778, which allowed for "free and protected" trade between Spain and its colonies. This trade system disintegrated during the Napoleonic era, and contraband became common again.

== Post-independence transition ==
During the early post-independence period, an important share of Argentina's exports came from cattle and sheep production. The livestock-raising economy was based upon the abundance of fertile land in the littoral provinces. Cropping apparently lacked comparative advantage compared to livestock grazing.

Exports rose 4% to 5% annually from 1810 to 1850 and 7% to 8% from 1850 to 1870. This growth was achieved through the extension of the frontier and greater efficiency in livestock production.

As a result of the diversification in markets and products, Argentina managed to escape the trap of a single-staple economy and sustained its economic growth over six decades. The combined effect of declining prices of textiles and rising prices of livestock products produced dramatic improvements in the terms of trade, which rose 377% between 1810 and 1825 in local prices. Several governors waged campaigns against the natives to increase the available lands, from Juan Manuel de Rosas to Julio Argentino Roca.

Most poor gauchos joined forces with the most powerful caudillos in the vicinity. As the Federalist Party, they opposed the policies implemented by Buenos Aires, and waged the Argentine Civil Wars.

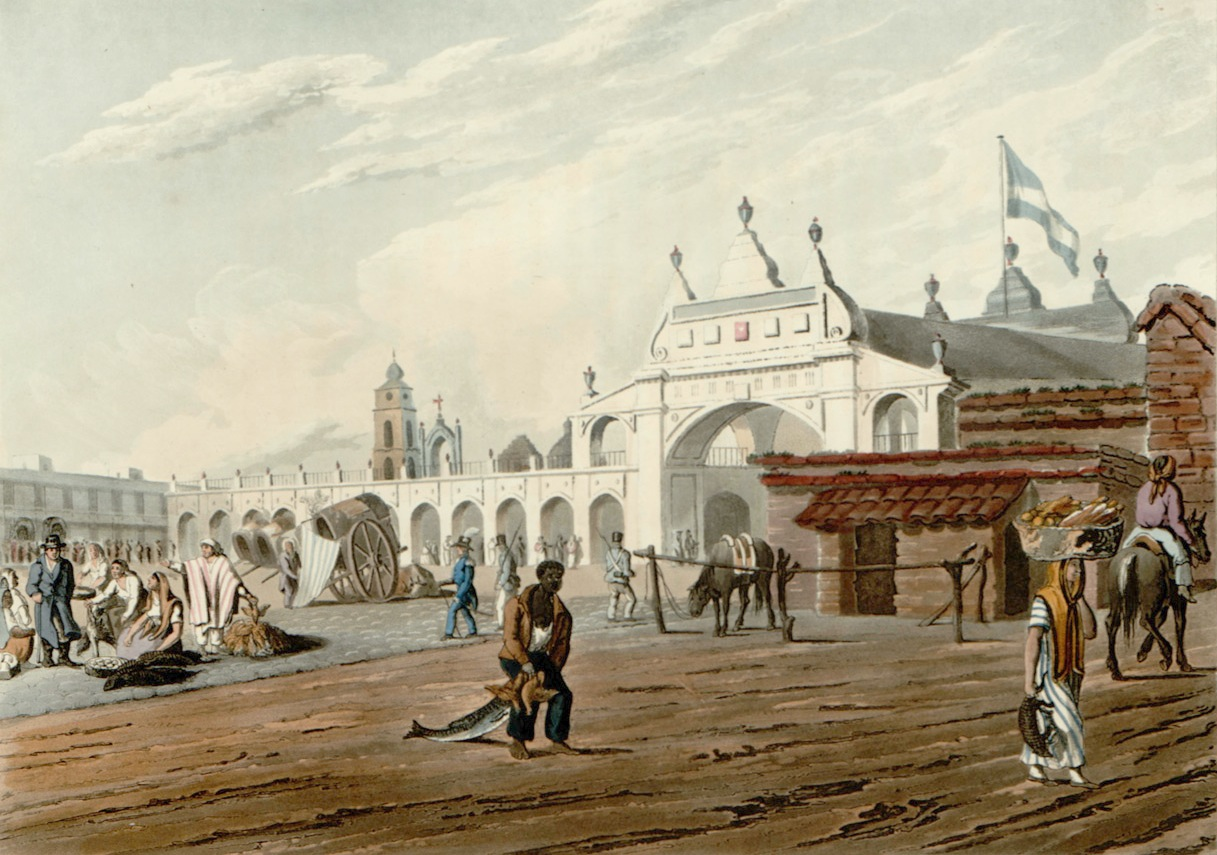
Buenos Aires marketplace, 1810s

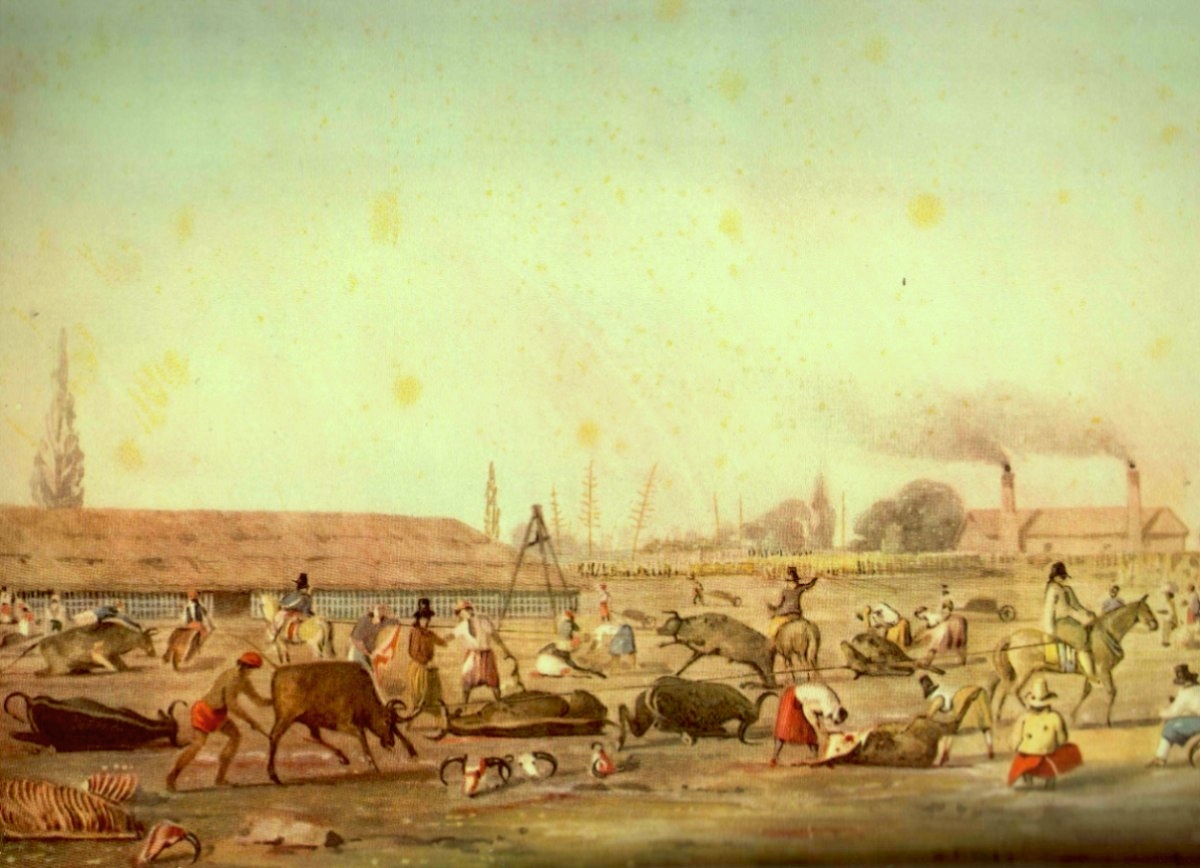
Impression of a Buenos Aires slaughterhouse by Charles Pellegrini, 1829.

=== 1810–1829 ===
After Argentina became independent in 1810, an era in which commerce was controlled by a small group of peninsular merchants came to an end. The Primera Junta, the first government established after the 1810 May Revolution, undertook a protectionist policy until their fall from government.

The First Triumvirate (1811–1812), influenced by Bernardino Rivadavia and Manuel García, instead promoted unrestricted trade with Britain. The Second Triumvirate (1812–1814) and José Gervasio Artigas (who controlled the Liga Federal during the 1815–1820 period) sought to restore the initial protectionist policy, but the Supreme Director restored free trade once more. Thus, the economy of the Río de la Plata became one of the most open economies in the world.

Between 1812 and 1816 divisions developed between a Unitarist faction centred on Buenos Aires and a Federalist faction in the provinces, which eventually led to a series of civil wars that ended with the conquest of Buenos Aires by Federalist caudillos at the Battle of Cepeda in 1820.

Each province had its own money, and the same money had a different value from one province and another, and even among cities in the same province.

The government of Martín Rodríguez (1820–1824) and his minister Bernardino Rivadavia, then Las Heras and finally Rivadavia himself as the first president of Argentina from 1826 to 1827, developed an economic plan deemed as "The happy experience". This plan increased the British influence in the national politics. It was based on five main pillars: complete free trade and no protectionist policies against British imports, finance with a central bank managed by British investors, absolute control of the port of Buenos Aires as the sole source of income from national customs, British exploitation of the national natural resources, and a Unitarist national organization centred in Buenos Aires. After Rivadavia resigned in 1827, ending the "happy experience", the federalist Manuel Dorrego assumed power as governor of Buenos Aires, but was soon executed by the unitarist Juan Lavalle during a military coup.

The exports of gold, allowed by the free trade policies, soon depleted the national reserves. This posed a great problem, as gold was the medium of exchange of the local economy. Rivadavia sought to fix it by establishing the "Discount Bank", a central bank for printing fiat money. Like a number of other central banks worldwide, this bank was not owned by the state, but by private investors, British in this case.

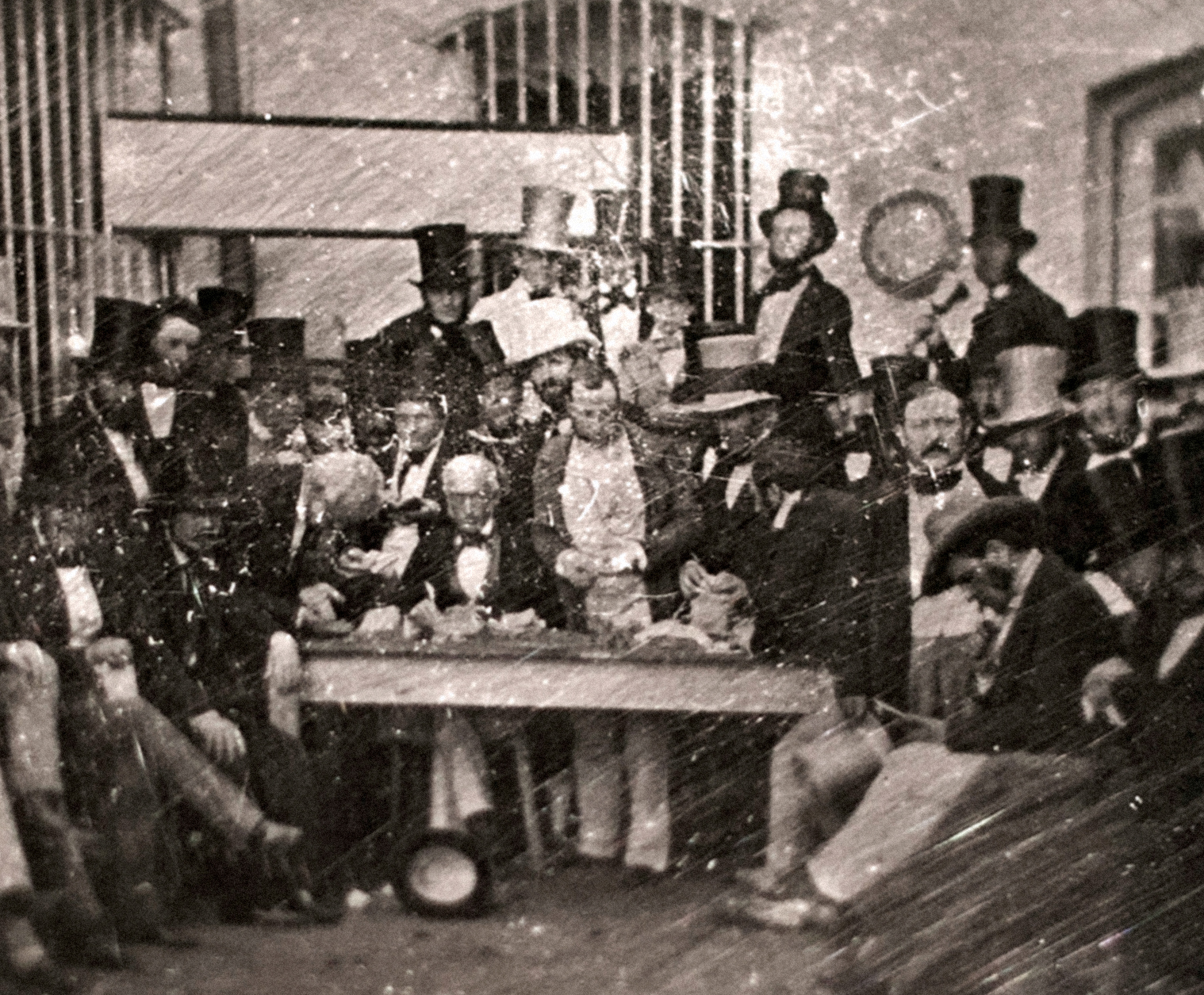
Members of the "Sociedad El Camoatí" (1848–1856), the first stock exchange in Buenos Aires

The report of the American John Murray Forbes to John Quincy Adams, sixth President of the United States, in 1824 mentioned that Britain had a huge influence in the economic power of the country.

He mentioned that the government in Buenos Aires was so eager to be on good terms with Britain and gain recognition of the declaration of independence that most official institutions (as the Bank) were under British control, and that Britain had similar control over the Argentine economy to that metropole of a colony, without the financial, civil or military costs. Even the lack of an Argentine merchant fleet allowed Britain to manage the maritime trade. Forbes's testimony should be appraised in perspective of the contemporary Anglo-American commercial rivalry, In light of the partial nature of the account and of his "jealousy, even antipathy" towards the English in Rio de la Plata.

In the mid-1820s, when Manuel José García was Minister of Finance, the government borrowed heavily to finance new projects and to pay off war debts. These loans were tendered at usurious rates: in one notorious loan, the government received credit for £570,000 from the Baring Brothers in exchange for a debt of £1,000,000. In the 1820s, the peso papel began to lose value rapidly with respect to the peso fuerte, which was linked to the price of gold. In 1827 the peso papel was devalued by 33%, and was devalued again by 68% in 1829.

=== 1829–1870 ===
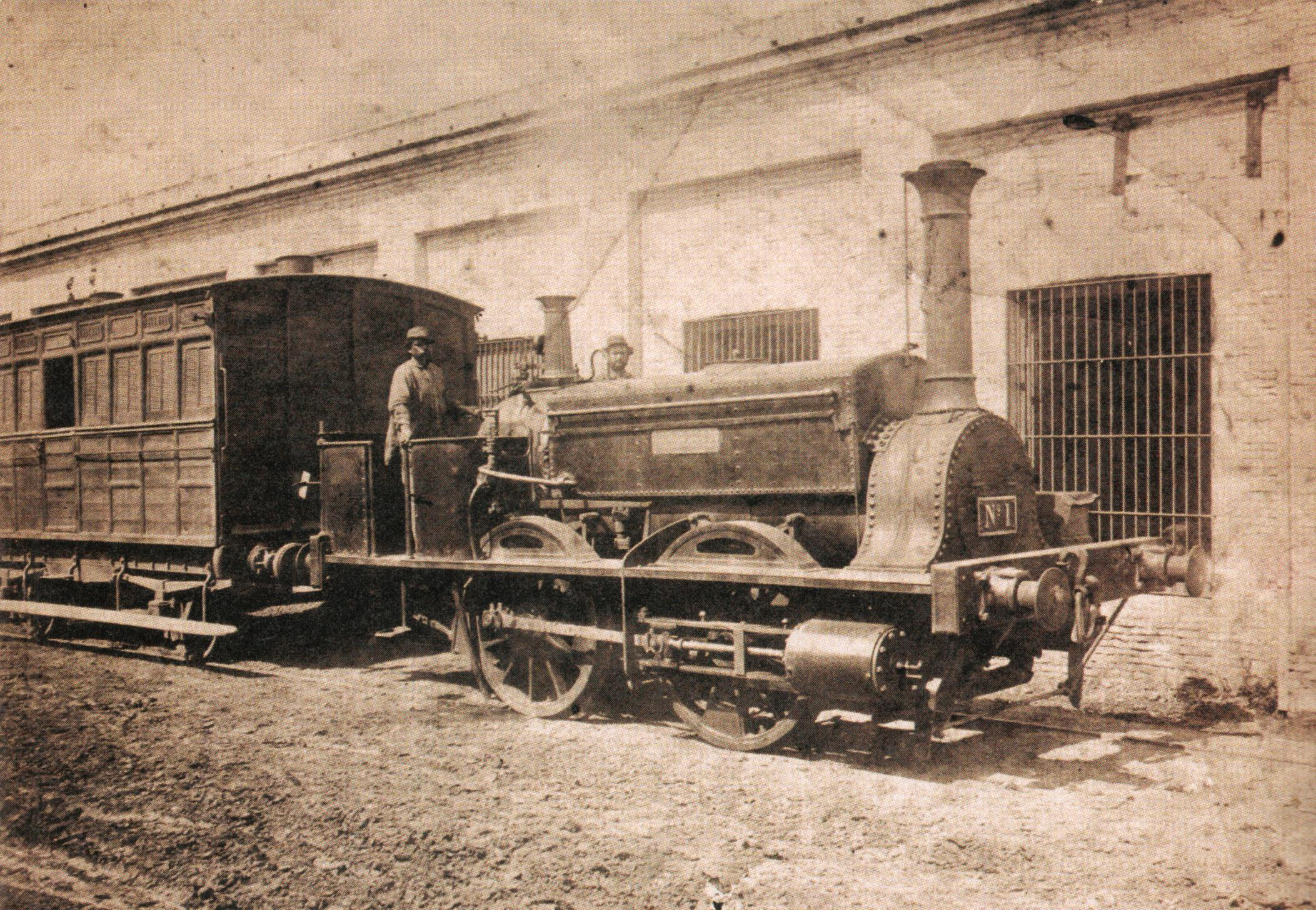
In 1857, La Porteña became the first locomotive to operate in Argentina.

Juan Manuel de Rosas forced Lavalle to leave the province, and the federals ruled Buenos Aires until 1852. Rosas modified a number of policies of the Rivadavian period but maintained others: he set a customs law with protectionist policies, but kept the port under the exclusive control of Buenos Aires and refused to call a constituent assembly.

The customs law set trade barriers to products produced in the country, and imposed high import tariffs on luxury goods, together with export quotas and tariffs on gold and silver. However, the law was not completely effective because of the control of the port, which did not allow the provinces a steady financial income. The exclusive control of the port was long resisted by federals from other provinces and led to the conflict of Rosas and Justo José de Urquiza at the battle of Caseros. Despite the financial obstacles, the economy of Entre Ríos grew to a size near that of Buenos Aires, with the decline of saladeros and the growth of wool production.

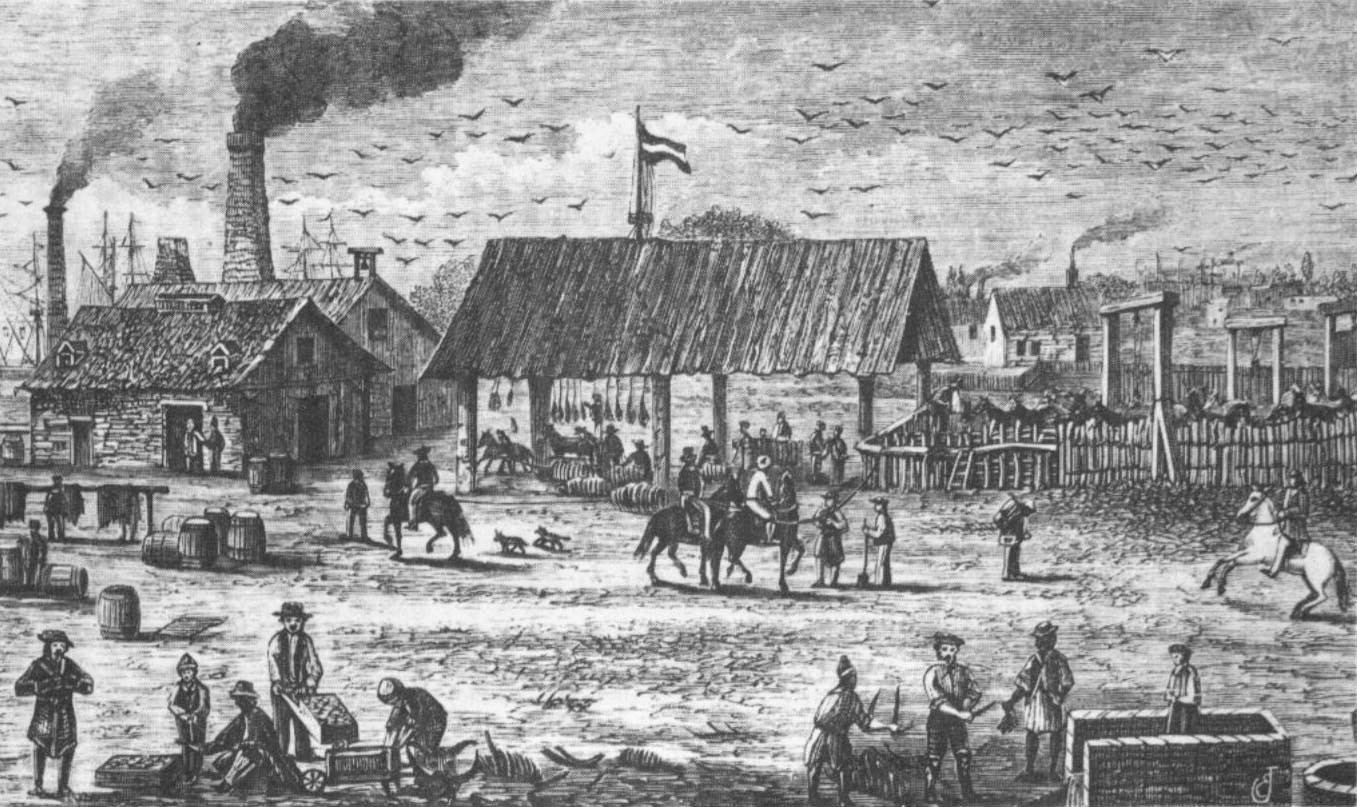
A saladero in Rosario, 1860s

In 1838 there was a new currency crisis, and the peso papel was devalued by 34%, and in 1839 when the peso papel lost 66% of its value. It was again devalued by 95% in 1845, and by 40% in 1851. The Alsina years, which coincided with the secession of Buenos Aires, saw an extremely poor economic performance. Efforts to fund extraordinary expenditure on the conflict between Buenos Aires and the other provinces of the Confederation caused the fiscal deficit to skyrocket. Similarly, the Confederation faced harsh economic conditions. Urquiza, president of the Confederation, issued the 'law of differential rights', benefiting the ships trading with the ports of the Confederation and but not with Buenos Aires.

The end of the civil wars provided the political and legal stability necessary to assert property rights and cut transaction costs, contributing to the huge inflows of capital and labor resources that built modern Argentina. In 1866 an attempt was made to stabilize the currency, by introducing a system of convertibility, which restricted the monetary authorities to issue paper currency only if it was fully backed by gold or convertible foreign currency. The decades of the 1860s and 1880s experienced the most favorable performance of the economy overall, setting the stage for the so-called Golden Age of Argentine history. Nevertheless, the first years of independence included a difficult economic development. In spite of the new freedom caused by the inauguration of the republic, the country was not economically united: expansion in some parts and decline in other parts. Indeed, people experienced different levels of income and welfare. Therefore, it is unclear whether 1820–1870 brought an income or welfare improvement.

In the 60 years after the founding of the farming colony at Esperanza in 1856, the base of Argentine agriculture gradually shifted from livestock to crops.

== Export-led boom ==
"In spite of its enormous advance which the Republic has made within the last ten years, the most cautious critic would not hesitate to aver that Argentina has but just entered upon the threshold of her greatness."

— Percy F. Martin, Through Five Republics of South America, 1905.

Argentina, which had been insignificant during the first half of the 19th century, showed growth from the 1860s up until 1930 that was so impressive that it was expected to eventually become the United States of South America. This impressive and sustained economic performance was driven by the export of agricultural goods. A 2018 study describes Argentina as a "super-exporter" during the period 1880–1929 and credits the boom to low trade costs and trade liberalization on one hand and on the other hand to the fact that Argentina "offered a diverse basket of products to the different European and American countries that consumed them". The study concludes "that Argentina took advantage of a multilateral and open economic system."

During the second half of the 19th century, there was an intense process of colonization of the territory in the form of latifundia. Until 1875 wheat was imported as it was not grown in sufficient quantities to supply local demand; by 1903 the country supplied all its own needs and exported 75,270,503 imperial bushels (2,737,491.8 m^{3}) of wheat, enough to sustain 16,000,000 people.

In the 1870s real wages in Argentina were around 76% relative to Britain, rising to 96% in the first decade of the 20th century. GDP per capita rose from 35% of the United States average in 1880 to about 80% in 1905, similar to that of France, Germany and Canada.

=== 1870–1890 ===
Buenos Aires Docks, 1915. The British-financed docks and railway system created a dynamic agro-export sector that remains as an economic pillar.

In 1870, during Domingo Faustino Sarmiento's presidency, total debt amounted to 48 million gold pesos. A year later, it had almost doubled. Avellaneda became president after winning the 1874 presidential election. The coalition that supported his candidature became the Partido Autonomista Nacional, Argentina's first national party; all the presidents until 1916 would come from this party. Avellaneda undertook the tough actions needed to get the debt under control. In 1876 convertibility was suspended. The inflation rate rose to almost 20% in the following year, but the ratio of debt to GDP plummeted. Avellaneda's administration was the first to deliver a balance in the fiscal accounts since the mid-1850s. Avellaneda passed on to his successor, Julio Argentino Roca, a much more manageable economic environment.

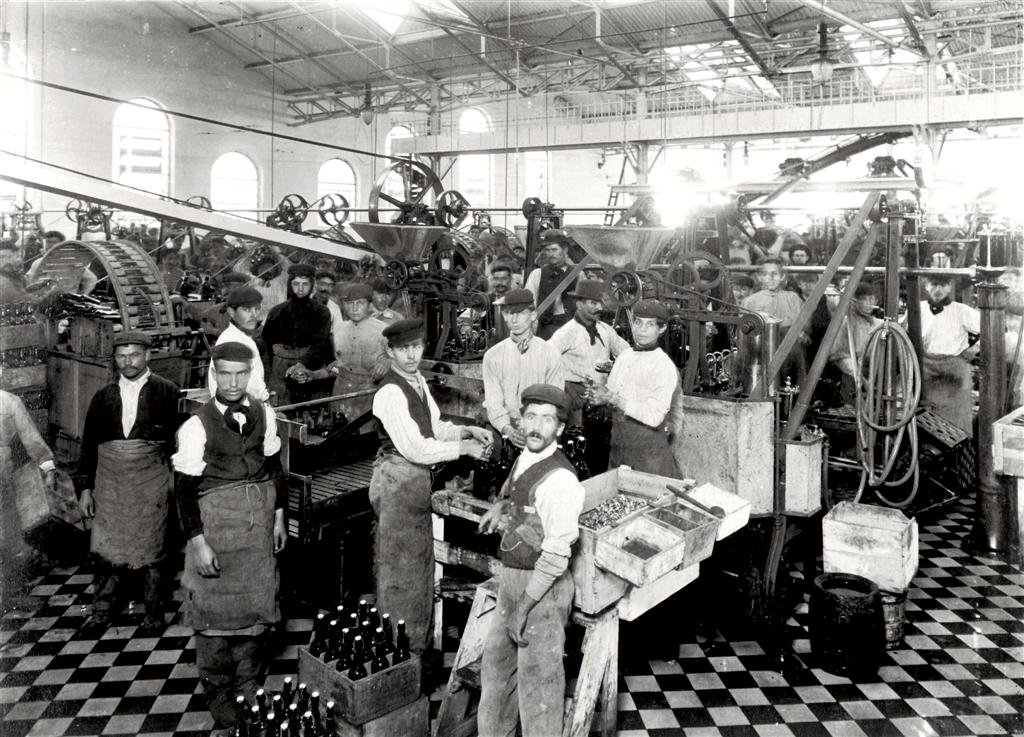
Quilmes brewery in 1910

In 1881, a currency reform introduced a bimetallic standard, which went into effect in July 1883. Unlike many precious metal standards the system was very decentralized: no national monetary authority existed and all control over convertibility rested with the five banks of issue. The period of convertibility lasted only 17 months: from December 1884 the banks of issue refused to exchange gold at par for notes. The suspension of convertibility was soon accommodated by the government, since, having no institutional power over the monetary system, there was little they could do to prevent it.

The profitability of the agricultural sector attracted foreign capital for railways and industries. British capital investments went from just over £20 million in 1880 to £157 million in 1890. During the 1880s, investment began to show some diversification as capital began to flow from other countries such as France, Germany and Belgium, though British investment still accounted for two thirds of total foreign capital. In 1890 Argentina was the destination of choice for British investment in Latin America, a position it held until World War I. By then, Argentina had absorbed between 40% and 50% of all British investment outside the United Kingdom. Despite its dependence on the British market, Argentina managed a 6.7% annual rate of growth of exports between 1870 and 1890 as a result of successful geographic and commodity diversification.

The first Argentine railway, a ten-kilometer (6.2 mi) road, had been built in 1854. By 1885, a total of 2,700 miles (4,300 km) of railways were open for traffic. The new railways brought livestock to Buenos Aires from the vast pampas, for slaughter and processing in the (mainly English) meat-packing plants, and then for shipment around the world. Some contemporary analysts lamented the export bias of the network configuration, while opposing the "monopoly" of private British companies on nationalist grounds. Others have since argued that the initial layout of the system was mostly shaped by domestic interests, and that it was not, in fact, strictly focused on the port of Buenos Aires.

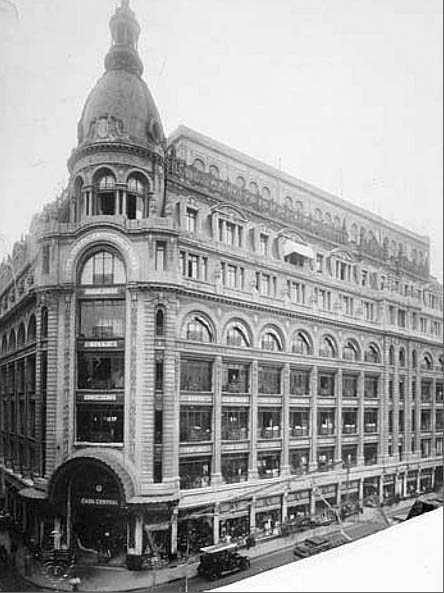
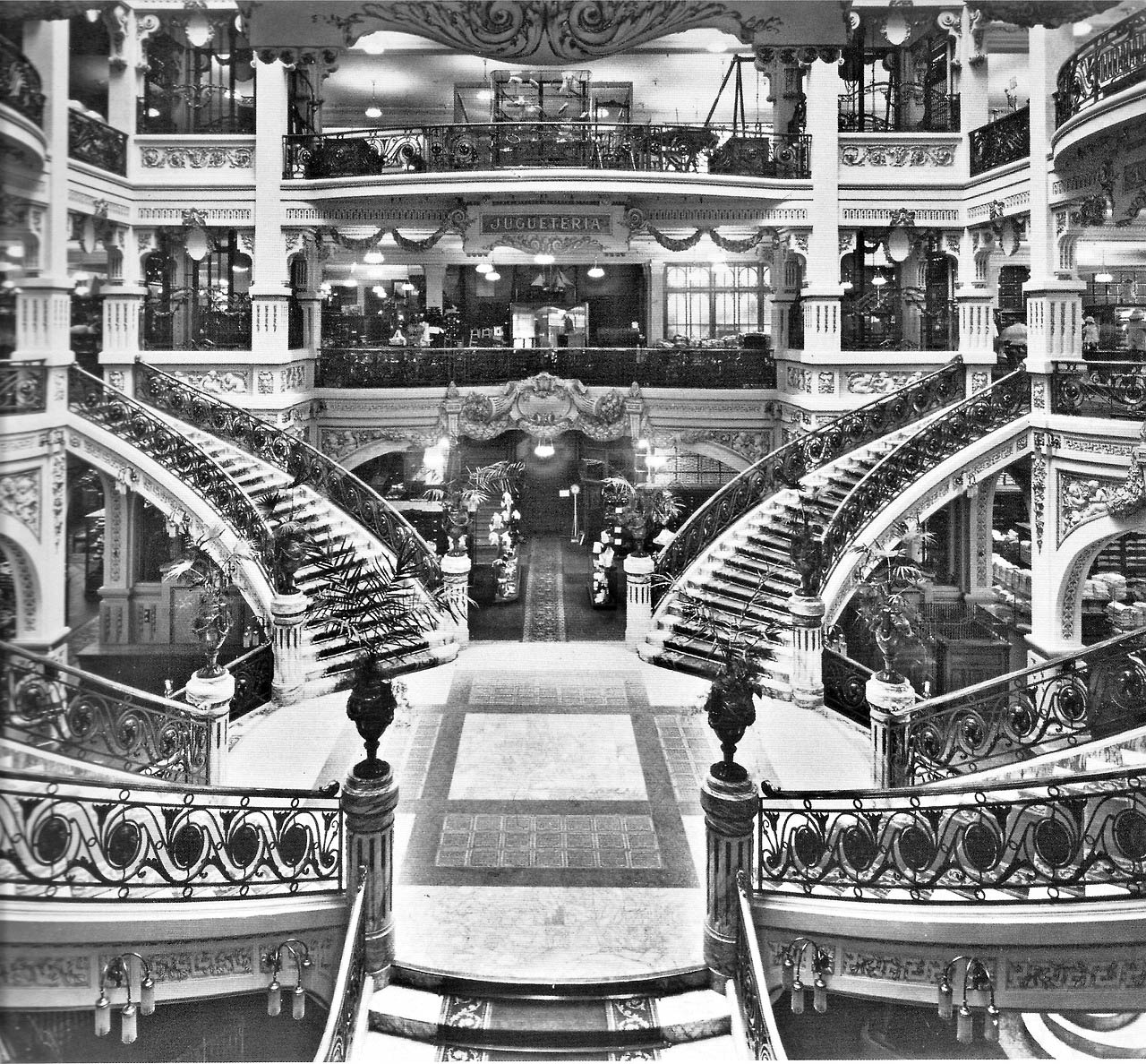
The Gath & Chaves luxury department store, opened in 1914; (left): exterior, (right): main hall with stairs and upper levels

The scarcity of labor and abundance of land induced a high marginal product of labor. European immigrants (chiefly Italians, Spaniards, French and Germans), tempted by the high wages, arrived in droves. The government subsidized European immigration for a short time in the late 1880s, but immigrants arrived in massive numbers even with no subsidy.

=== Baring crisis to World War I ===
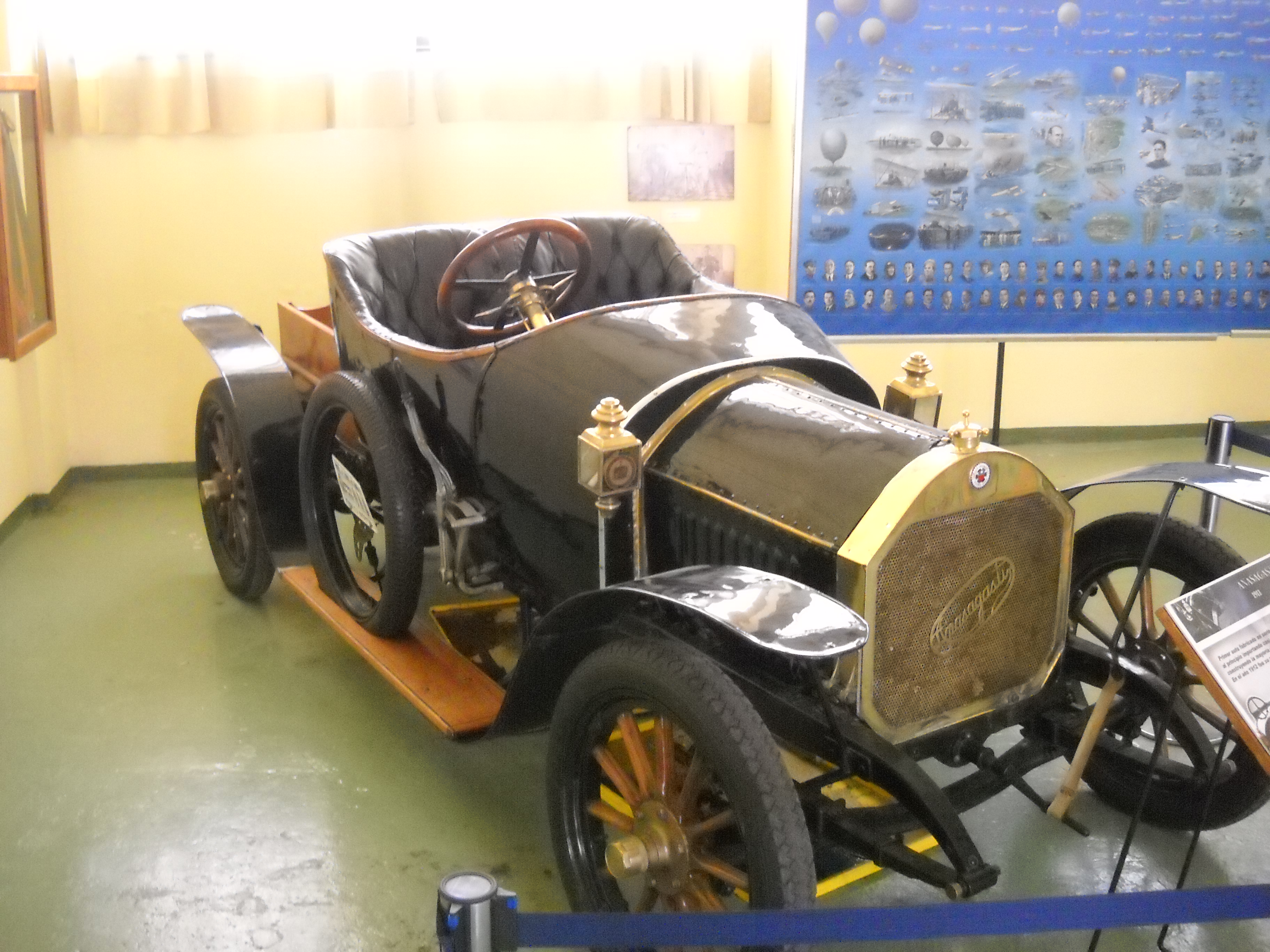
Launched in 1912, the Anasagasti was the first car designed and manufactured in Argentina, even managing to export a number of models to Europe.

Juárez Celman's administration saw a substantial increase in the ratio of debt to GDP toward the end of his tenure and an increasing weakness in the fiscal situation. The Baring Brothers merchant bank had developed a close and profitable association with Argentina, and when Celman's government was unable to meet its payments to the House of Baring, a financial crisis ensued. Argentina defaulted and suffered bank runs as the Baring Brothers faced failure. The crisis was caused by the lack of co-ordination between monetary policy and fiscal policy, which ultimately led to the collapse of the banking system. The financial crisis of 1890 left the government with no funds for its immigration subsidies program, and it was abolished in 1891. Loans to Argentina were severely curtailed, and imports had to be cut sharply. Exports were less affected, but the value of Argentine exports did not surpass the 1889 peak until 1898.

Celman's successor, Carlos Pellegrini, laid the foundations for a return to stability and growth after the restoration of convertibility in 1899. He also reformed the banking sector in ways that were to restore stability in the medium term. Rapid growth rates soon returned: in 1903–1913, GDP increased at an annual rate of 7.7%, and industry grew even faster, jumping by 9.6%. By 1906, Argentina had cleared the last remnants of the 1890 default and a year later the country re-entered the international bond markets.

All the same, between 1853 and the 1930s, fiscal instability was a transitory phenomenon. The depressions of 1873–77 and 1890–91 played a crucial role in fostering the rise of industry: timidly in the 1870s and more decisively in the 1890s, industry grew with each crisis in response to the need of a damaged economy to improve its trade balance through import-substitution. By 1914, about 15% the Argentine labor force was involved in manufacturing, compared to 20% involved in commercial activities. In 1913, the country's income per head was on a par with that of France and Germany, and far ahead of Italy's or Spain's. At the end of 1913, Argentina had a gold stock of £59 million, or 3.7% of the world's monetary gold, while representing 1.2% of the world's economic output.

== Interwar period ==
=== 1914–1929 ===
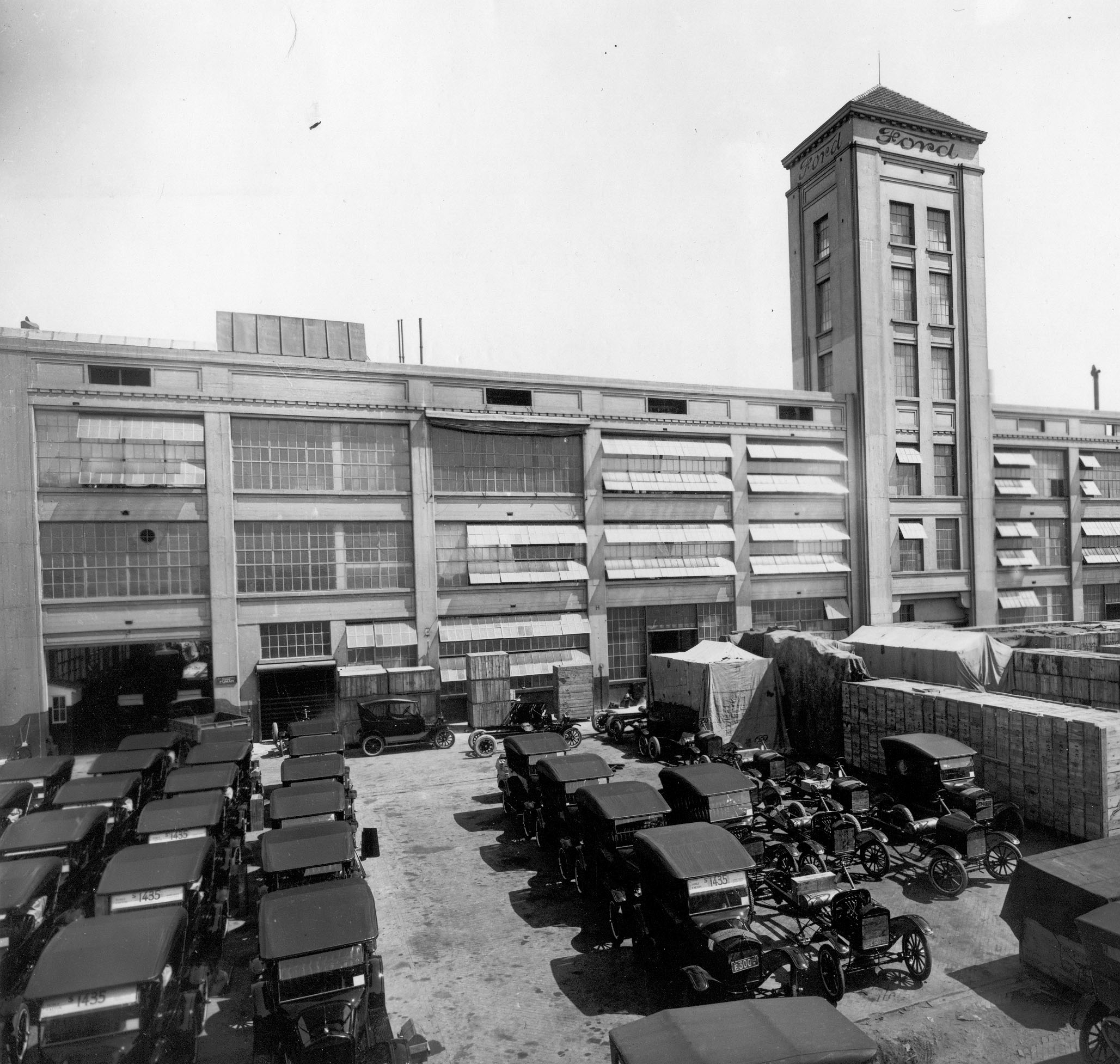
In 1922, the Ford Motor Company opened its assembly plant in Argentina. It was the third Ford assembly plant opened outside of the United States, after the ones in the United Kingdom and Canada. By 1925, it had sold 100,000 units of the iconic Ford T model.

Argentina, like many other countries, entered into a recession following the beginning of World War I as international flows of goods, capital and labour declined. Foreign investment in Argentina came to a complete standstill from which it never fully recovered: Great Britain had become heavily indebted to the United States during the war and would never again export capital at a comparable scale. And after the opening of the Panama Canal in 1914, Argentina and the other Southern cone economies declined, as investors turned their attention to Asia and the Caribbean. The United States, which came out of the war a political and financial superpower, especially perceived Argentina (and to a lesser extent Brazil) as a potential rival on world markets. Neither the Buenos Aires Stock Exchange nor the private domestic banks developed rapidly enough to fully replace British capital.

As a consequence, investable funds became increasingly concentrated in a single institution, the Banco de la Nacion Argentina (BNA), creating a financial system vulnerable to rent-seeking. Rediscounting and non-performing loans grew steadily at the BNA after 1914, polluting its balance sheet. This corrosion of balance sheets was a result of crony loans to the other banks and the private sector. In its rediscounting actions the BNA was not engaged in pure lender of last resort actions, following Bagehot's principle of lending freely at a penalty rate. Instead, the state bank allowed the private banks to shed their risks, with bad paper used as security, and lent them cash at 4.5%, below the rate the BNA offered its customers on time deposits.

However, unlike its neighbors, Argentina had relatively healthy growth rates during the 1920s, not being as affected by the worldwide collapse of commodity prices. For instance, during the 1920s, automobile ownership per capita in Argentina was the highest in the Southern Hemisphere, and grew to become the 4th highest in the world.

For all its success, by the 1920s Argentina was not an industrialized country by the standards of Britain, Germany or the United States. In the structure of its economy and its role as a commodity exporter, it has been compared to Canada and Australia during this period, in the framework of the Staple Theory. A major hindrance to full industrialization was the lack of energy sources such as coal or hydropower. Experiments with oil, discovered in 1907, had poor results. YPF, the first state-owned oil company in Latin America, was founded in 1922 as a public company responsible for 51% of the oil production; the remaining 49% was in private hands.

Exports of frozen beef, especially to Great Britain, proved highly profitable after the invention of refrigerated ships in the 1870s. However Britain imposed new restrictions on meat imports in the late 1920s, which sharply reduced beef imports from Argentina. Ranchers responded by switching from livestock to crop production, but there was lasting damage to the Argentine economy.

=== Great Depression ===
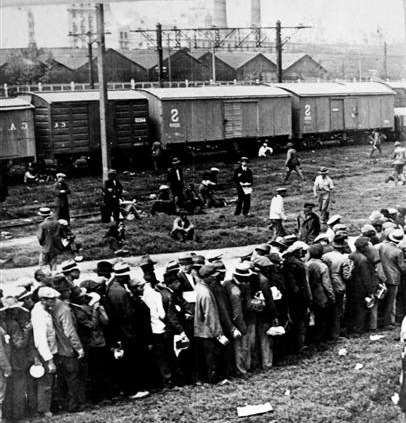
Unemployed men in "Villa Desocupación" in Retiro, 1930.

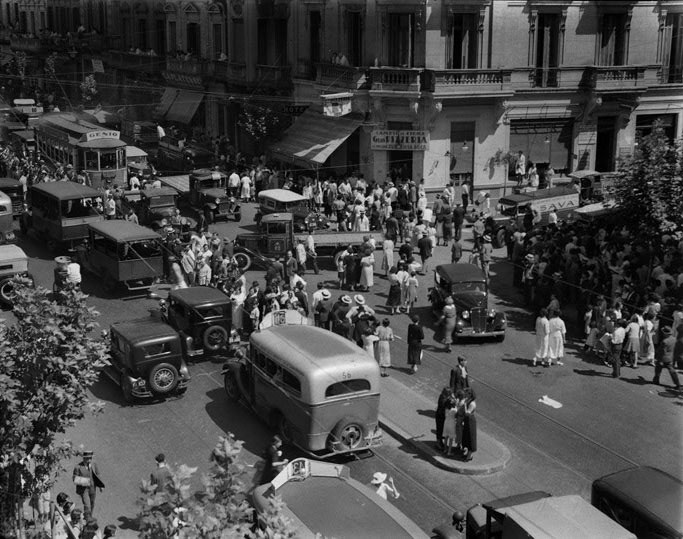
A traffic jam caused by a demonstration, Buenos Aires, 1936. Photo by Horacio Coppola.

In the short term, the Great Depression had a comparatively mild effect on Argentina: the unemployment rate never went above 10%, and the country largely recovered by 1935. However, the Depression permanently halted its economic expansion. American and European demand for Argentinian crops and cattle exports decreased sharply. Actually, much like other agricultural exporters, the economy was already in a downturn beginning in 1927, a result of declining prices.

Argentina abandoned the gold standard in December 1929, earlier than most countries. For much of the previous period, the country had operated a currency board, in which a body known as the caja de conversión was charged with maintaining the peso's value in gold. The devaluation of the peso increased the competitiveness of its exports and protected domestic production. Argentina saw the value of its exports drop from $1,537 million in 1929 to $561 million in 1932, but this was by no means the most severe downturn in the region.

In response to the Great Depression, successive governments pursued a strategy designed to transform Argentina into a country self-sufficient in industry as well as agriculture. The strategy of growth was based on import substitution in which tariffs and quotas for final goods were raised. The import-substitution process had progressively been adopted since the late 19th century, but the Great Depression intensified it. The government's encouragement of industrial growth diverted investment from agriculture, and agricultural production fell dramatically.

In 1930, the armed forces forced the Radicals from power, Political turbulence intensified,, and with it, economic turbulence. In 1932, Argentina required immigrants to have a labor contract prior to arrival, or proof of financial means of support. The Roca-Runciman Treaty of 1933 gave Argentina a quota of the British market for exports of its primary products, but the discriminatory British imperial tariffs and the effects of deflation in Britain actually led to a small decline of Argentine exports to Great Britain.

Unemployment resulting from the Great Depression caused unrest. The industrial growth spurt of the 1930s gradually slowed. The economic conditions of the 1930s contributed to the process of internal migration from the countryside and smaller towns to the cities, especially Buenos Aires, where there were greater opportunities for employment. The urban working classes led several unsuccessful uprisings prior to the 1937 presidential elections. Traditional export agriculture stagnated at the outbreak of World War II and remained sluggish.

In 1940, Finance Minister Federico Pinedo proposed an economic plan to seek closer ties to the United States and encourage industrial exports to replace the slowing agricultural exports as the engine for the nation's growth, but it was never fully implemented due to a lack of political consensus, owing to the illness and resignation of President Ortiz and the political turmoil of those years. Some economic historians lament the lack of follow-through on this plan and the subsequent focus on the internal market instead, as a critical mistake. Nevertheless, industrial exports did see some growth during this period, as non-traditional manufactured goods grew from a share of 2.9% of total exports in 1939, to 19.4% by 1943.

== Import substitution industrialization Era ==
=== First Peronist period: Nationalization ===
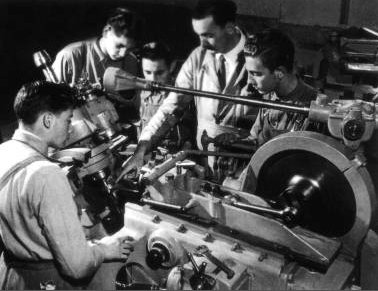
A vocational school in 1945

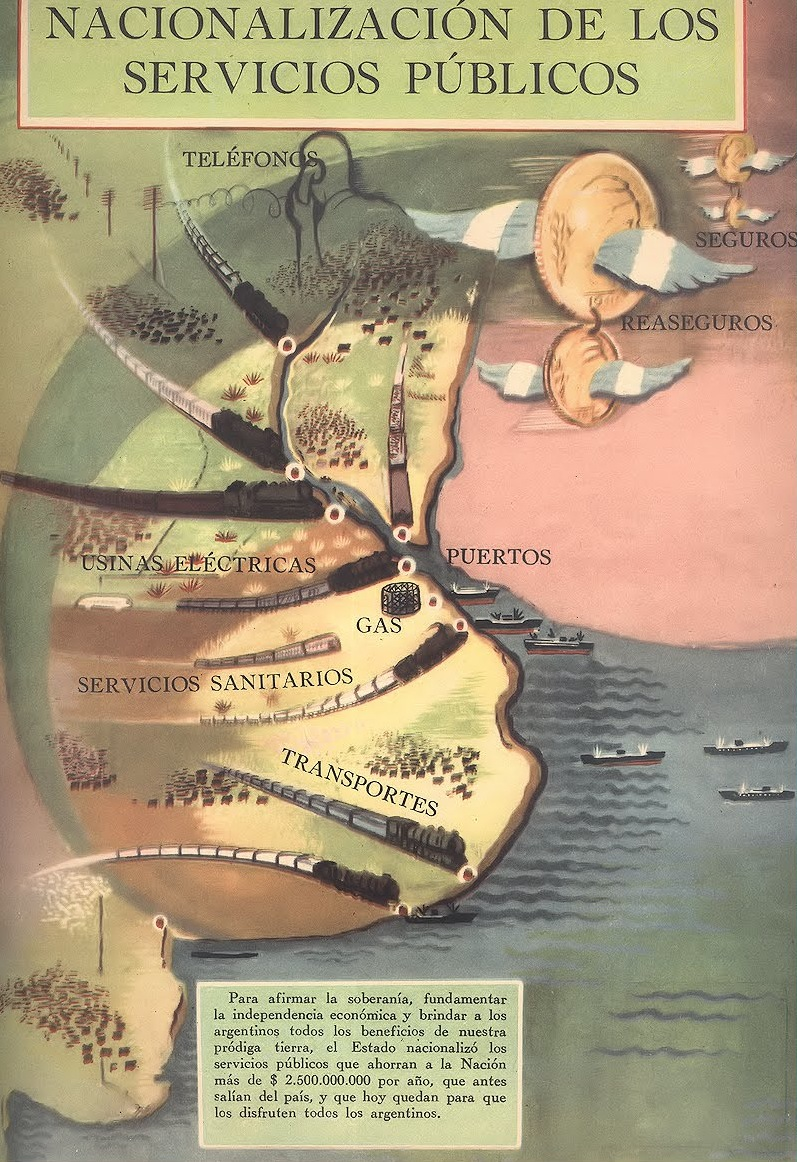
Propaganda poster of the first Five-Year Plan (1946–1951) promoting the nationalization of public services

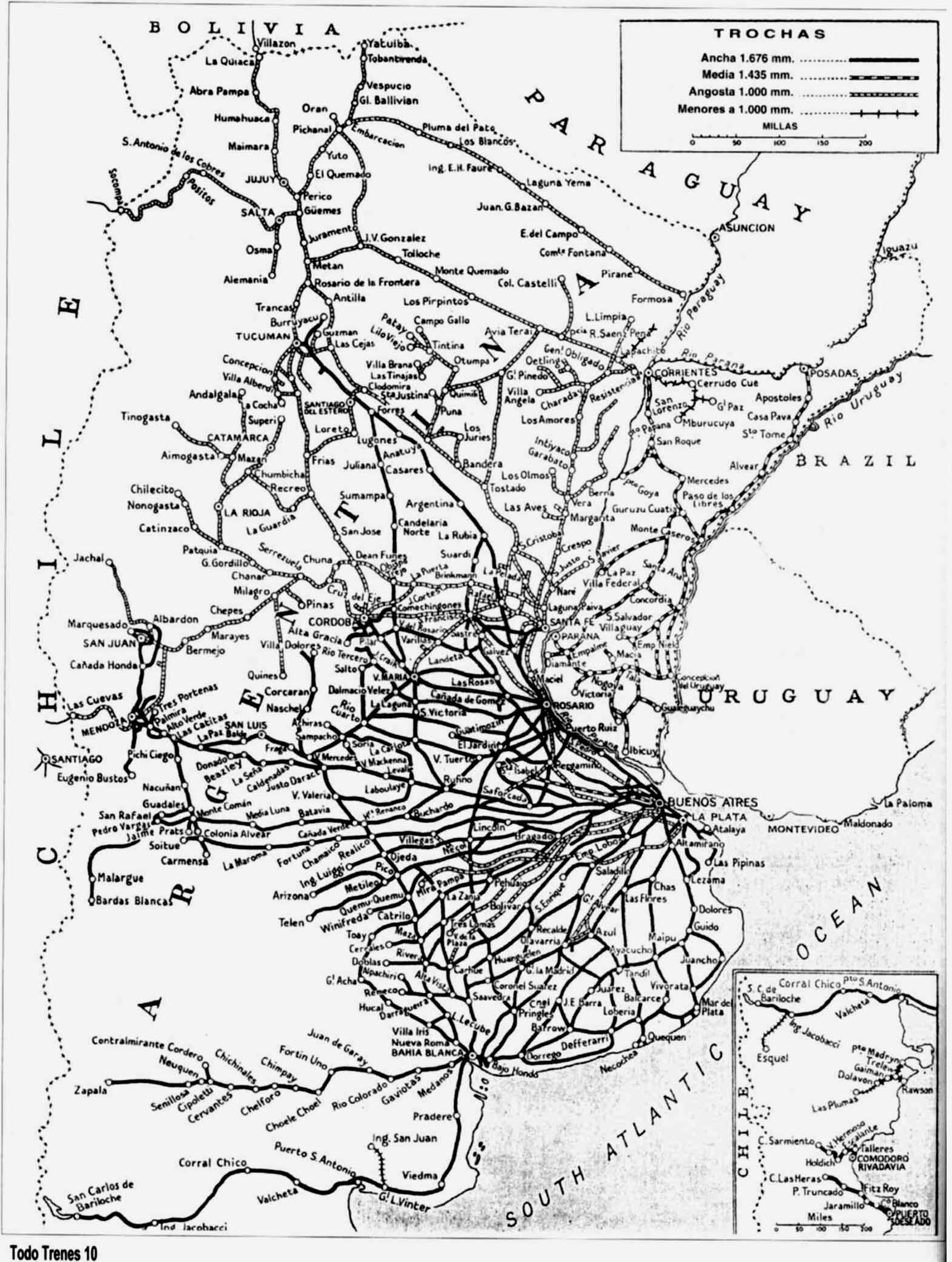
Argentina's railroad network at its maximum extent, during the 1950s. Built largely by private capital, the entirety of the network was nationalized in stages between 1946 and 1948 in agreement with the companies involved. At its peak, it was the 8th largest railroad network in the world.

After the 1943 Argentine coup d'état, Juan Perón became Minister of Labor. Campaigning among workers with promises of land, higher wages, and social security, he won a decisive victory in the 1946 presidential elections. Under Perón, the number of unionized workers expanded as he helped to establish the powerful General Confederation of Labor. Perón turned Argentina into a corporatist country in which powerful organized interest groups negotiated for positions and resources. During these years, Argentina developed the largest middle class on the South American continent.

Early Peronism was a period of macroeconomic shocks during which a strategy of import substitution industrialization was put into practice. Bilateral trade, exchange control and multiple exchange rates were its most important characteristics. Beginning in 1947, Perón took a leftward shift after breaking up with the "Catholic nationalism" movement, which led to gradual state control of the economy, reflected in the increase in state-owned property, interventionism (including control of rents and prices) and higher levels of public investment, mainly financed by the inflationary tax. The expansive macroeconomic policy, which aimed at the redistribution of wealth and the increase of spending to finance populist policies, led to inflation.

Wartime reserves enabled the Peronist government to fully pay off the external debt in 1952; by the end of the year, Argentina became a net creditor to the tune of US$5 billion. Between 1946 and 1948, the French and British-owned railways were nationalized, and the existing networks were expanded, with the rail network reaching 120,000 kilometers by 1954. The government also established the IAPI to control the foreign trade in export commodities. Perón erected a system of almost complete protection against imports, largely cutting off Argentina from the international market. In 1947, he announced his first Five-Year Plan based on growth of nationalized industries. Protectionism also created a domestically oriented industry with high production costs, incapable of competing in international markets. At the same time, output of beef and grain, the country's main export goods, stagnated. The IAPI began shortchanging growers and, when world grain prices dropped in the late 1940s, it stifled agricultural production, exports and business sentiment, in general. Despite these shortcomings, protectionism and government credits did allow an exponential growth of the internal market: radio sales increased 600% and fridge sales grew 218%, among others.

During the first Five-Year Plan, various public works and programs were executed, with the aim to modernize the country's infrastructure. For example, a total of 22 hydroelectric power plants were erected, increasing electrical output from 45,000 kVA in 1943 to 350,000 kVA in 1952. Between 1947 and 1949, a network of gas pipelines, which linked Comodoro Rivadavia with Buenos Aires, was built. The gas distribution reached 15 million m³, reducing costs by a third.

During this period Argentina's economy continued to grow, on average, but more slowly than the world as a whole or than its neighbors, Brazil and Chile. A suggested cause is that a multitude of frequently changed regulations, at times extended to unusual specifics (such as a 1947 decree setting prices and menus for restaurants), inhibited economic activity. The long-term effect was to create pervasive disregard for the law, which Argentines came to view as a hindrance to earning a living rather than an aid to enforcing legitimate property rights. The combination of industrial protectionism, redistribution of income from the agrarian to the industrial sector, and growing state intervention in the economy sparked an inflationary process. By 1950, Argentina's GDP per capita accounted fell to less than half of that of the United States.

Perón's second Five-Year Plan in 1952 favored increased agricultural output over industrialization, but industrial growth and high wages in previous years had expanded the domestic demand for agrarian goods. During the 1950s, output of beef and grain fell, and the economy suffered. The policy shift toward agricultural production created a gap in income distribution, as the majority of those who worked in agriculture labored on tiny plots, while the majority of the land was in large estates. Argentina signed trade agreements with Britain, the Soviet Union and Chile, slightly opening the market to international trade as Perón's second economic plan sought to capitalize on the country's comparative advantage in agriculture.

=== Post-Peron era and the 1960s ===
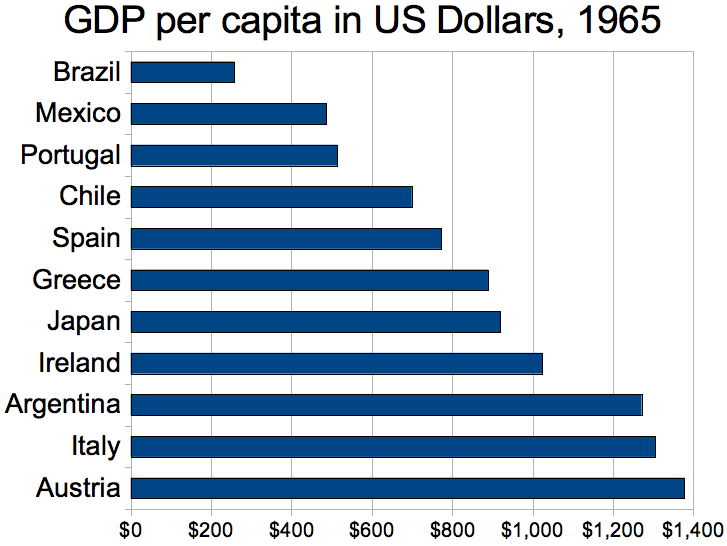
In terms of GDP per capita, Argentina remained well above its neighbors as late as 1965

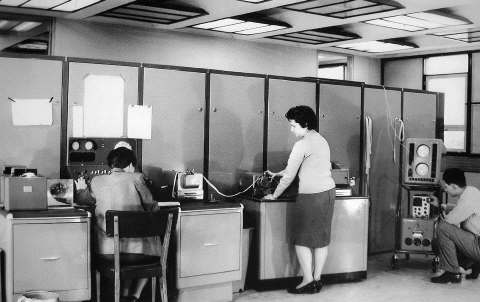
In 1961, a Ferranti Mercury II named "Clementina" became one of the first computers in use in Argentina.

In the 1950s and part of the 1960s, the country had a slow rate of growth in line with most Latin American countries, while most of the rest of the world enjoyed a golden era. Stagnation prevailed during this period, and the economy often found itself contracting, mostly because of union strife.

Wage growth beginning in 1950 pushed prices up. The inflation rate increased faster, and soon real wages fell. High inflation prompted a stabilization plan that included tighter monetary policy, a cut in public expenditures, and increases in taxes and utility prices. Increasing economic wariness as the 1950s progressed became one of the leading causes for Perón's downfall in the Revolución Libertadora of 1955. The working classes saw their quality of life diminished, thus stripping Perón of a large part of his popular support.

Arturo Frondizi won the 1958 presidential election in a landslide. In the same year he announced the beginning of the "oil battle": a new attempt at import substitution which aimed to achieve self-sufficiency in oil production by signing several contract with foreign companies for the mining and exploitation of oil. In 1960, Argentina joined the Latin American Free Trade Association.

Another coup in June 1966, the so-called Argentine Revolution, brought Juan Carlos Onganía to power. Ongania appointed Adalbert Krieger Vasena to head the Economy Ministry. His strategy implied a very active role for the public sector in guiding the process of economic growth, calling for state control over the money supply, wages and prices, and bank credit to the private sector.

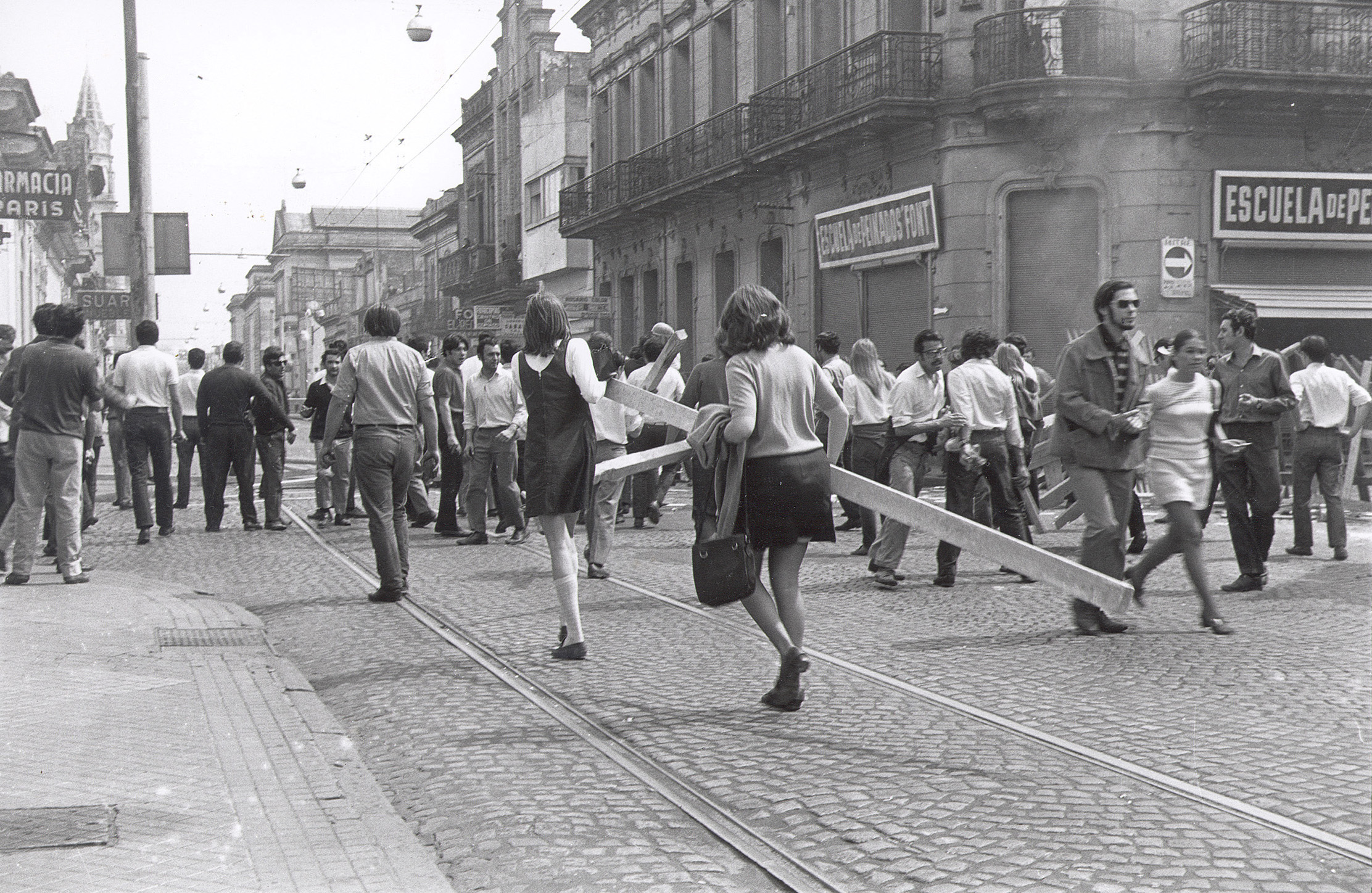
The Rosariazo in 1969. The worsening economy and the onset of dictatorship led to waves of protests, strikes and riots.

Krieger's tenure witnessed increased concentration and centralization of capital, coupled with privatization of many important sectors of the economy. The international financial community offered strong support for this program, and economic growth continued. GDP expanded at an average annual rate of 5.2% between 1966 and 1970, compared to 3.2% during the 1950s.

After 1966, in a radical departure from past policies, the Ministry of Economy announced a program to reduce rising inflation while promoting competition, efficiency, and foreign investment. The anti-inflation program focussed on controlling nominal wages and salaries. Inflation decreased sharply, decreasing from an annual rate of about 30% in 1965–67 to 7.6% in 1969. Unemployment remained low, but real wages fell.

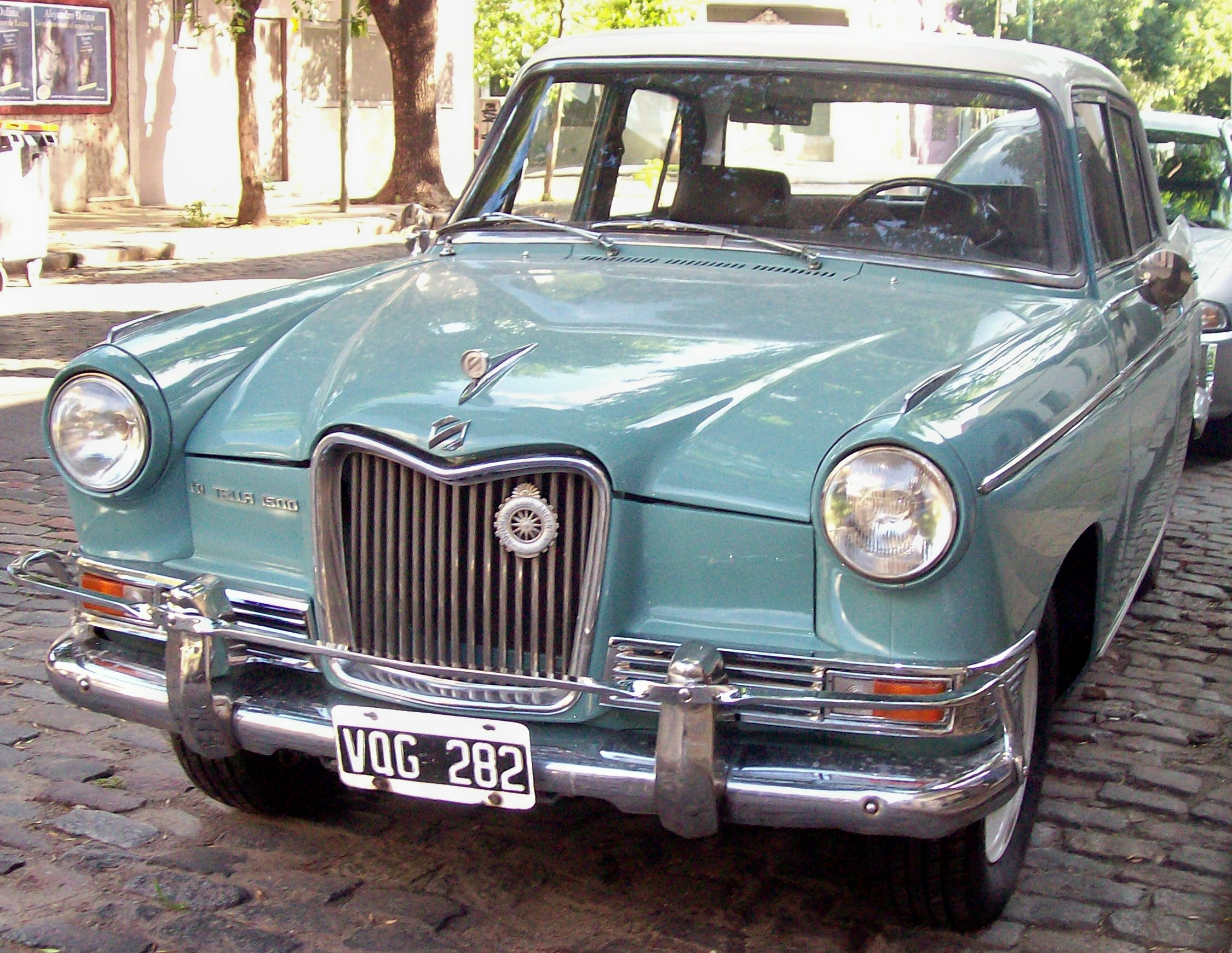
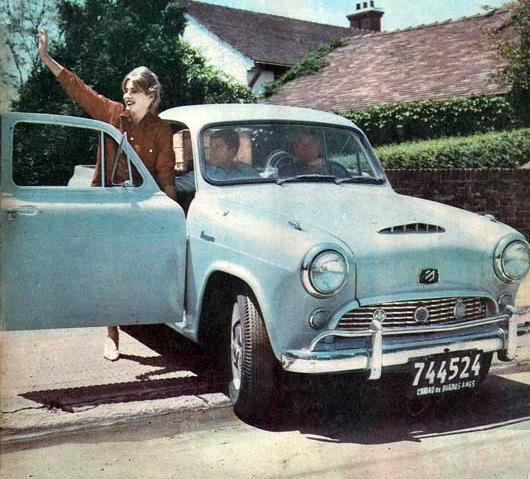
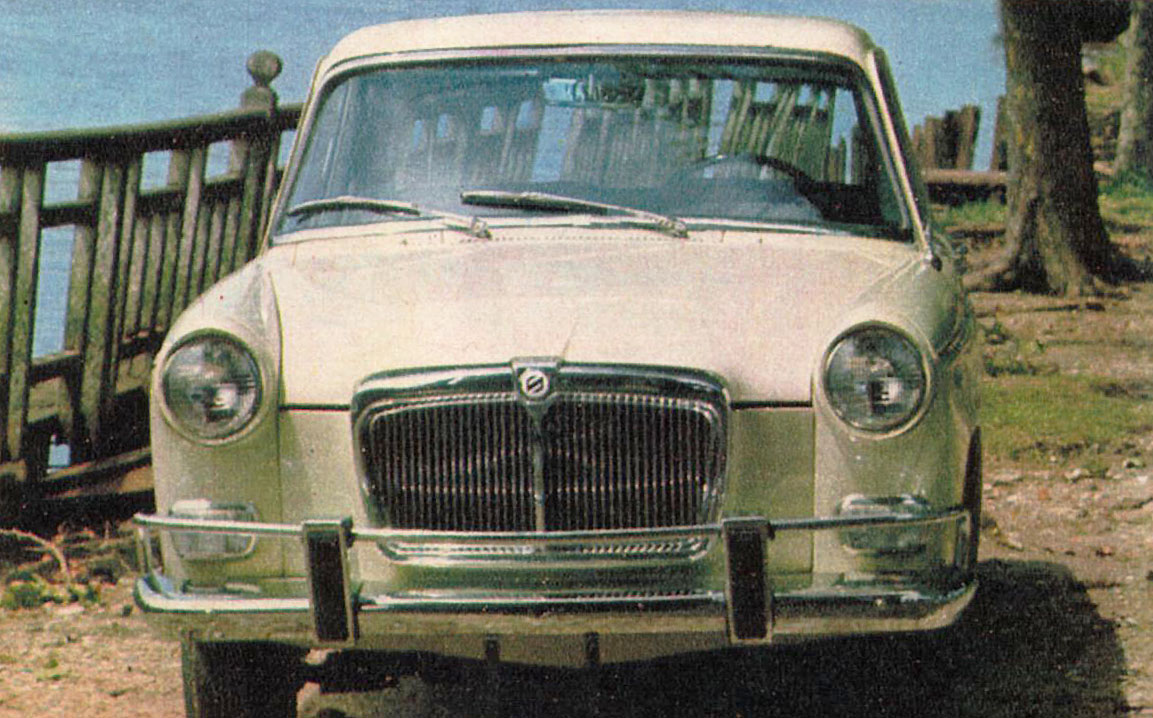
Three popular automobile models by Siam Di Tella, manufactured during the late 1950s and early 1960s.

A gradual reversal in trade policy culminated in the military announcing import substitution as a failed experiment, lifting protectionist barriers and opening the economy to the world market. This new policy boosted some exports, but an overvalued currency meant certain imports were so cheap that local industry declined, and many exports were priced out of the market. The Ministry of Economy put an end to the exchange rate policy of previous governments. The currency underwent a 30% devaluation. In 1970, the "peso moneda nacional" (one of the longest-lived currencies in the region) was replaced by the "peso ley" [shortened form of "peso ley 18188"] (100 to 1).

In May 1969, discontent with Krieger's economic policies led to riots in the cities of Corrientes, Rosario and Córdoba. Krieger was removed, but the Onganía administration was unable to agree on an alternative economic policy. By 1970, the authorities were no longer capable of maintaining wage restraints, leading to a wage-price spiral. As the economy started to languish and import substitution industrialization ran out of steam, urban migration slowed. Per capita income fell, and with it the standard of living. Perón's third term of office was characterized by an expansive monetary policy, which resulted in an uncontrolled rise in the level of inflation.

== Deindustrialization (1975–2002) ==
=== Stagnation (1975–1990) ===
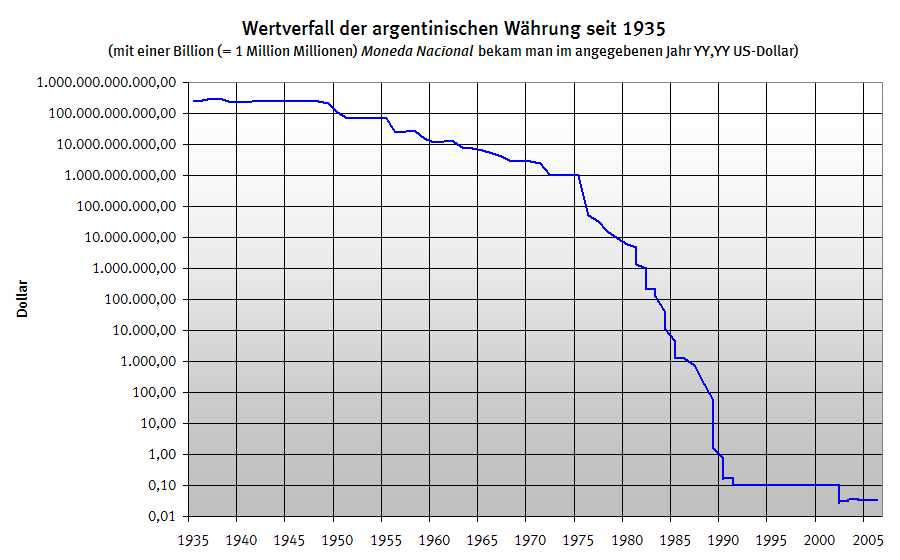
From the Rodrigazo in 1975, inflation accelerated sharply, leading to several redenominations of the Argentine currency.

Between 1975 and 1990, real per capita income fell by more than 20%, wiping out almost three decades of economic development. The manufacturing industry, which had experienced a period of uninterrupted growth until the mid-1970s, began a process of continuous decline. The extreme dependence on state support of the many protected industries exacerbated the sharp fall of the industrial output. The share of manufacturing as a percentage of GDP at the start of the 1990s had receded to similar levels than in the 1940s.

In the early 1970s, per capita income in Argentina was twice as high as in Mexico and more than three times as high as in Chile and Brazil. By 1990, the difference in income between Argentina and the other Latin American countries was much smaller. Starting with the Rodrigazo in 1975, inflation accelerated sharply, reaching an average of more than 300% per year from 1975 to 1991, increasing prices 20 billion times.

When the military dictatorship finance minister José Alfredo Martínez de Hoz assumed power, inflation was equivalent to an annual rate of 5000%, and output had declined sharply. In 1976, the era of import substitution was ended, and the government lowered import barriers, liberalized restrictions on foreign borrowing, and supported the peso against foreign currencies. That exposed the fact that domestic firms could not compete with foreign imports because of the overvalued currency and long-term structural problems. A financial reform was implemented that aimed both to liberalize capital markets and to link Argentina more effectively with the world capital market.

After the relatively stable years of 1976 to 1978, fiscal deficits started to climb again, and the external debt tripled in three years. The increased debt burden interrupted industrial development and upward social mobility. From 1978, the rate of exchange depreciation was fixed with a tablita, an active crawling peg that was based on a timetable to announce a gradually-declining rate of depreciation. The announcements were repeated on a rolling basis to create an environment in which economic agents could discern a government commitment to deflation. Inflation gradually fell throughout 1980 to below 100%. In 1978 and 1979, the real exchange rate appreciated because inflation consistently outpaced the rate of depreciation. The overvaluation ultimately led to capital flight and a financial collapse.

The failure of Banco de Intercambio Regional, in March 1980, led to runs on other banks.

Growing government spending, large wage raises, and inefficient production created a chronic inflation that rose through the 1980s, when it briefly exceeded an annual rate of 1000%. Successive regimes tried to control inflation by wage and price controls, cuts in public spending, and restriction of the money supply. Efforts to stem the problems came to naught when in 1982 Argentina came into armed conflict with the United Kingdom over the Falkland Islands.

Timeline of Argentine exports from 1975 to 1989

In August 1982, after Mexico had announced its inability to service its debt, Argentina approached the International Monetary Fund (IMF) for financial assistance, as it too was in serious difficulties. While developments looked positive for a while, an IMF staff team visiting Buenos Aires in August 1983 discovered a variety of problems, particularly a loss of control over wages affecting both the budget and external competitiveness, and the program failed. With the peso quickly losing value to inflation, the new Argentine peso argentino was introduced in 1983, with 10,000 old pesos exchanged for each new peso.

In December 1983, Raúl Alfonsín was elected President of Argentina, bringing an end to the military dictatorship. Under Alfonsin, negotiations started on a new program with the IMF, but they led to nothing. In March 1984, Brazil, Colombia, Mexico and Venezuela lent Argentina $300 million for three months, followed by a similar amount by the United States. That provided some breathing space as it was not before late September 1984 that an agreement was reached between the IMF and Argentina.

In 1985, the Argentine austral replaced the discredited peso. In 1986, Argentina failed to pay the debt for several months, and the debt was renegotiated with the creditor banks. In 1986 and 1987, the Austral Plan faded away, as fiscal policy was undermined by large off-budget spending and a loose monetary policy, again falling out of compliance with an IMF program. A new IMF arrangement was reached in July 1987, only to collapse in March 1988.

The next move by the authorities was to launch the Primavera Plan in August 1988, a package of economically heterodox measures that foresaw little fiscal adjustment. The IMF refused to resume lending to Argentina. Six months after its introduction, the plan collapsed, leading to hyperinflation and riots.

=== Convertibility Plan (1991–2002) ===
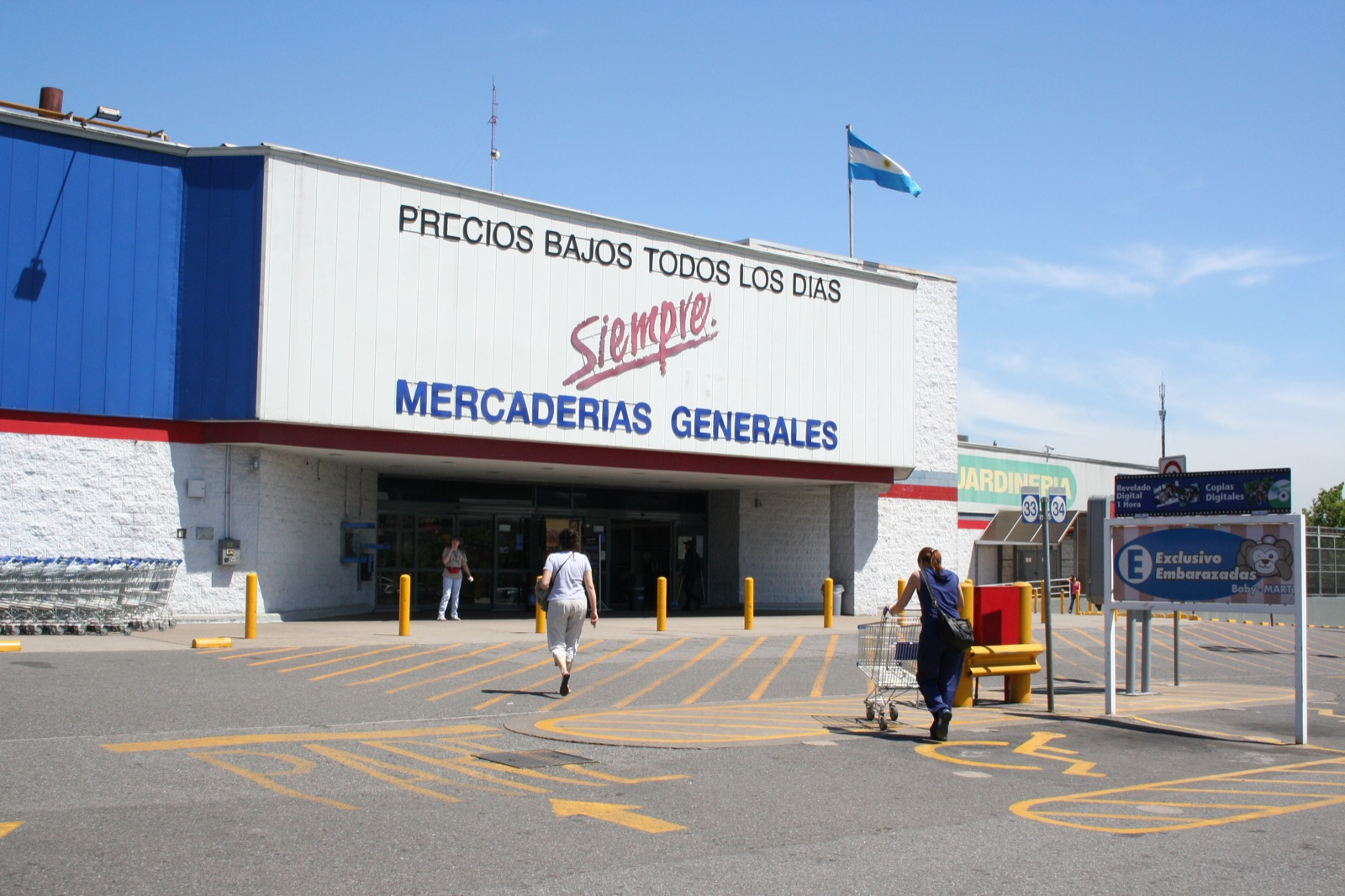
Multinational retailers like Walmart and Carrefour opened hypermarkets in every major Argentine city in the early 1990s.

The Peronist Carlos Menem was elected president in May 1989. He immediately announced a new shock program, this time with more fiscal adjustment in view of a government deficit of 16% of GDP. In November 1989 agreement was reached on yet another standby with the IMF, but again the arrangement was ended prematurely, followed by another bout of hyper-inflation, which reached 12,000% per year.

After the collapse of public enterprises during the late 1980s, privatization became strongly popular. Menem privatized almost everything the state owned, except for a couple of banks. In terms of service there were indisputable improvements. For example, before the telephone privatization, to get a new line it was not unusual to wait more than ten years, and apartments with telephone lines carried a big premium in the market. After privatization the wait was reduced to less than a week. Productivity increased as investment modernized farms, factories and ports. However, in all cases, there were large outflows of employees. In addition, the process of privatization was suspected of corruption in many cases. Ultimately, the privatized enterprises became private (rather than public) monopolies. Their prices on long-term contracts were indexed to American inflation, even though prices in Argentina were falling.

In 1991, economy minister Domingo Cavallo set out to reverse Argentina's decline through free-market reforms such as open trade. On 1 January 1992, a monetary reform replaced the austral with the peso at a rate of 10,000 australs for 1 peso. The cornerstone of the reform process was a currency board, under which the peso was fixed by law at par to the dollar, and the money supply restricted to the level of hard-currency reserves. This was a risky policy which meant at a later stage Argentina could not devalue. After a lag, inflation was tamed. With risk of devaluation apparently removed, capital poured in from abroad. GDP growth increased significantly and total employment rose steadily until mid-1993. During the second half of 1994, the economy slowed down and unemployment increased from 10% to 12.2%.

Although the economy was already in a mild recession at this point, conditions worsened substantially after the devaluation of the Mexican peso during December 1994. The economy shrank by 4%, and a dozen banks collapsed. With the labor force continuing to expand and employment falling sharply along with aggregate demand, unemployment rose by over 6% in 6 months. But the government responded effectively: it tightened bank regulation and capital requirements, and encouraged foreign banks to take over weaker local ones. The economy soon recovered and, between 1996 and 1998, both output and employment grew rapidly and unemployment declined substantially. However, at the beginning of 1999, the Brazilian currency underwent a strong depreciation. The Argentine economy contracted 4% in 1999, and unemployment increased again.

Exports grew from $12 billion in 1991 to $27 billion in 2001, but many industries could not compete abroad, especially after Brazil's devaluation. The strong, fixed exchange rate turned the trade balance to a cumulative US$22 billion in deficits between 1992 and 1999. Unable to devalue, Argentina could only become more competitive if prices fell. Deflation came from recession, falling wages and rising unemployment. Interest rates remained high, with banks lending dollars at 25%.

The share of public spending in GDP increased from 27% in 1995 to 30% in 2000. Some poorer provinces had depended on state enterprises or on inefficient industries, such as sugar, which could not compete when international trade was opened. To quell social unrest, provincial governors padded their payrolls. The government had embarked on an old-age pension reform with costs reaching 3% of GDP in 2000, as it still had to pay pensioners but no longer received contributions.

== Economic crisis (1998–2002) ==
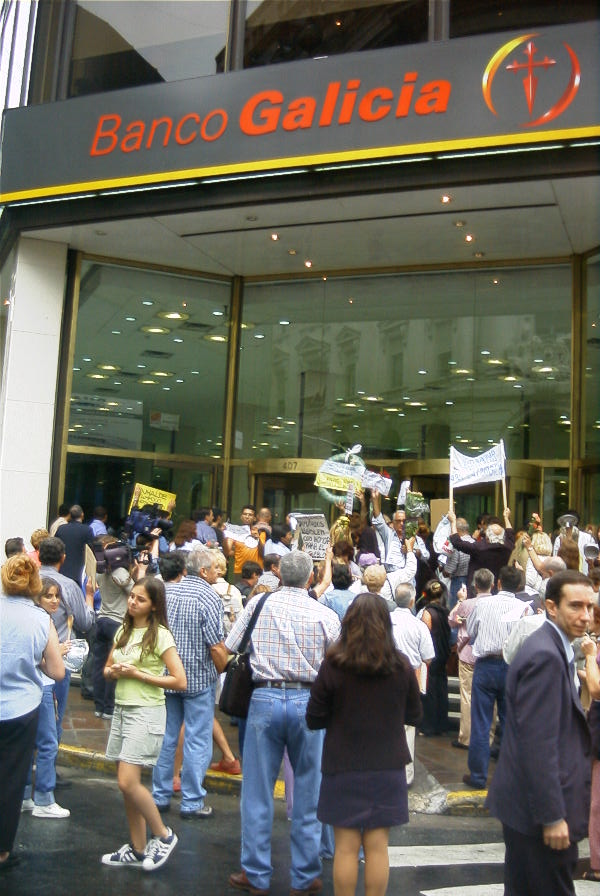
February 2002: depositors protest against frozen accounts for fear they might lose value, or worse.

Argentina fell into a deep recession in the second half of 1998, triggered and then compounded by a series of adverse external shocks, which included low prices for agricultural commodities, the appreciation of the US dollar, to which the peso was pegged at par, the 1998 Russian financial crisis, the LTCM crisis and the devaluation of the Brazilian real in January 1999. Argentina's sluggish GDP growth fuelled concerns about the sustainability of public debt.

In December 1999, President Fernando de la Rúa took office, seeking assistance from the IMF shortly thereafter. In March 2000, the IMF agreed to a three-year $7.2 billion stand-by arrangement with Argentina, conditioned on a strict fiscal adjustment and the assumption of 3.5% GDP growth in 2000 (actual growth was 0.5%). In late 2000, Argentina rapidly lost credit in capital markets, as reflected in a sharp and sustained rise in spreads on Argentine bonds over U.S. Treasuries. In December, the de la Rua government announced a $40 billion multilateral assistance package organized by IMF. The uneven implementation of fiscal adjustments and reforms, a worsening global macroeconomic environment, and political instability led to the complete loss of market access and intensified capital flight by the second quarter of 2001. Argentine sovereign debt, held mostly in bonds, was massively sold short and the government found itself unable to borrow or meet debt payments.

In December 2001, a series of deposit runs began to destabilize the banking system, leading the Argentine authorities to impose a partial withdrawal freeze. With Argentina no longer in compliance with the conditions of the expanded IMF-supported program, the IMF decided to suspend disbursements. At the end of December, in a climate of severe political and social unrest, the country partially defaulted on its international obligations; in January 2002, it formally abandoned the currency convertibility regime.

The ensuing economic and political crisis was arguably the worst since the country's independence. By the end of 2002, the economy had contracted by 20% since 1998. Over the course of two years, output fell by more than 15%, the Argentine peso lost three-quarters of its value, and registered unemployment exceeded 25%. Income poverty in Argentina grew from 16.8% in October 1993, to an already high 25.9% in October 1998 (at the beginning of the recession), to 35.4% in October 2001, to a peak of 54.3% in October 2002.

Critics of the policy of economic liberalization pursued during the Menem Presidency argued that Argentina's economic woes were caused by neoliberalism, which had been actively promoted by the U.S. government and the IMF under the Washington Consensus. Others have stressed that the main shortcoming of economic policy-making during the 1990s was that economic reform was not pursued with enough determination. A 2004 report by the IMF's Independent Evaluation Office criticized the IMF's conduct prior to Argentina's economic collapse of 2001, saying the IMF had supported the country's fixed exchange rate for too long, and was too lenient towards fiscal deficits.

== Kirchnerism and relative growth (2003–2015) ==
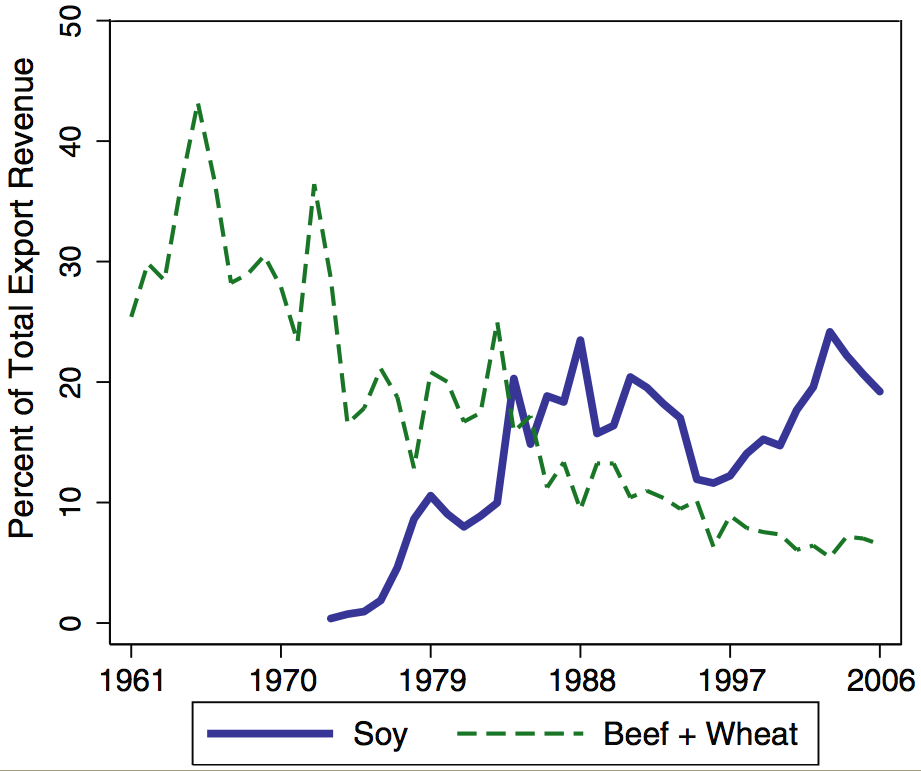
In the mid-2000s, soybeans, soybean oil and meal generated more than 20% of Argentina's export revenue.

In January 2002 Eduardo Duhalde was appointed president, the fifth in two weeks. Roberto Lavagna, who became Minister of the Economy in April 2002, was credited for the ensuing recovery, having stabilized prices and the exchange rate to head off hyperinflation. After the default in 2001, growth reached over 6% a year for seven of the eight years to 2011. This was in part due to a commodity price boom, and also because the government managed to keep the value of the currency low, boosting industrial exports.

=== Kirchner administration ===
Néstor Kirchner became president in May 2003. In the mid-2000s, export of unprocessed soybeans, soybean oil, and meal generated more than 20% of Argentina's export revenue, triple the joint share of the traditional exports of beef and wheat. Export taxes comprised 8% to 11% of the Kirchner government's total tax receipts, around two-thirds from soy exports. Taxes on imports and exports increased government spending from 14% to 25% of GDP. However, the import and export taxes discouraged foreign investment, while high spending pushed inflation over 20%.

An attempt by the Kirchner administration to impose price controls in 2005 failed, as many items went out of stock and the mandatory prices were often ignored. Various sectors of the economy were re-nationalized, including the postal service (2003), the San Martín Railway line (2004), the water utility serving the Province of Buenos Aires (2006) and Aerolíneas Argentinas (2009).

In December 2005, Kirchner decided to liquidate the Argentine debt to the IMF in a single payment, without refinancing, for a total of $9.8 billion. The payment was partly financed by a US$1.6 billion loan from Venezuela. As of mid-2008 Venezuela holds an estimated US$6 billion in Argentine debt. In 2006, Argentina re-entered international debt markets selling US$500 million of its Bonar V five-year dollar denominated bonds, with a yield of 8.36%, mostly to foreign banks, and Moody's boosted Argentina's debt rating from B− to B.

In early 2007 the administration began interfering with inflation estimates.

=== Fernández administration ===
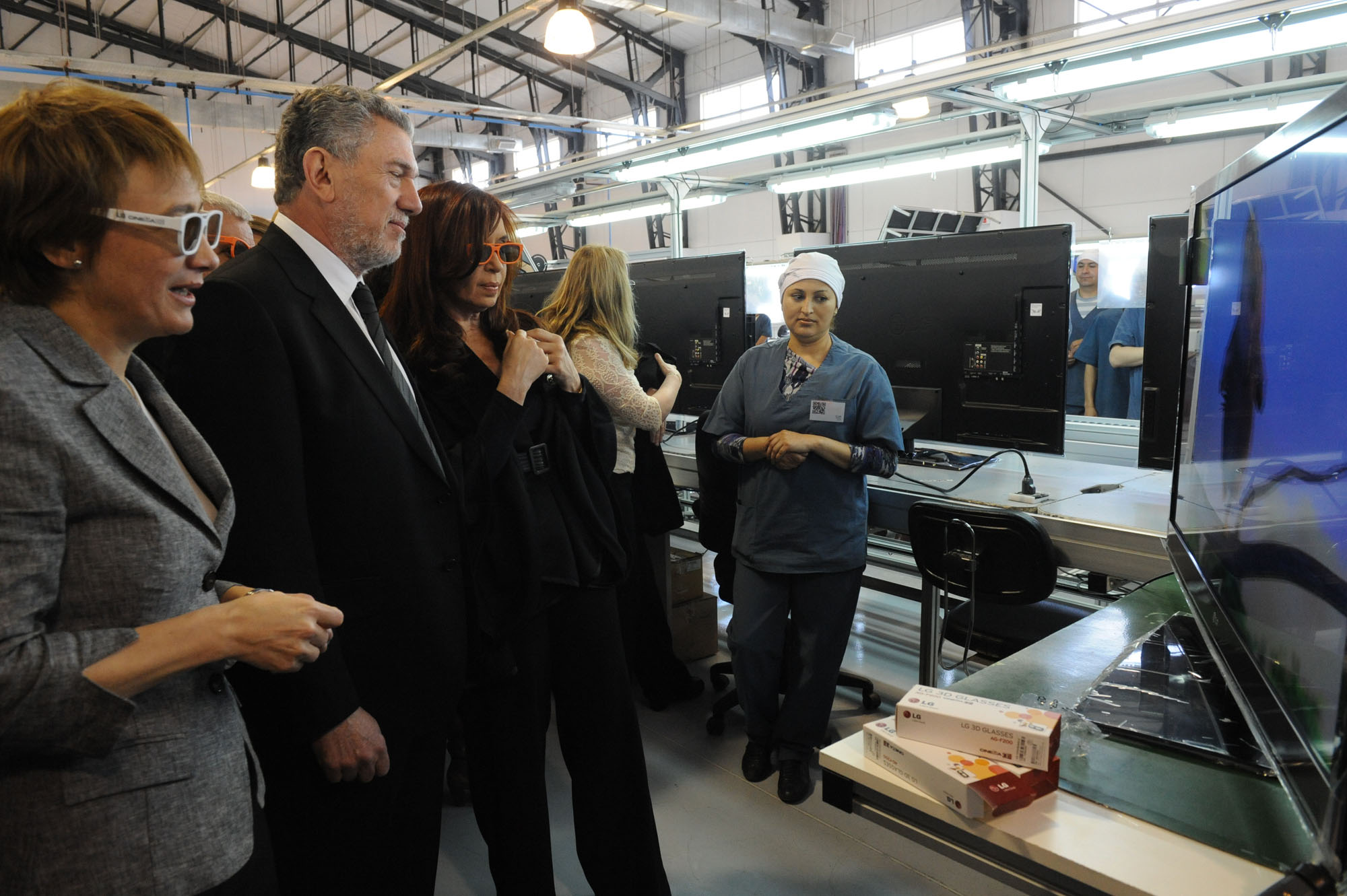
President Cristina Fernández de Kirchner inaugurating a factory in Ushuaia. Firms like Blackberry, HP and Motorola have set up plants in Tierra del Fuego, drawn by tax breaks.

On December 10, 2007, Cristina Fernández de Kirchner became president. In 2008 the rural sector mobilized against a resolution that would have increased the tax rate on soybean exports from 35% to 44.1%. Ultimately, the new taxation regime was abandoned. Official Argentine statistics are believed to have significantly underreported inflation since 2007, and independent economists publishing their own estimates of Argentine inflation have been threatened with fines and prosecution.

In October 2008 President Fernández de Kirchner nationalized private pension funds worth almost $30 billion, ostensibly to protect the pensions against falling stock prices around the world, although critics said the government simply wanted to add the money to its budget. Private pension funds, which were first licensed in 1994, suffered large losses during the 1998–2002 crisis and by 2008, the state subsidized 77% of the funds' beneficiaries.

The late-2000s recession hit the country in 2009 with GDP growth slowing to 0.8%. High GDP growth resumed in 2010, and the economy expanded by 8.5%. In April 2010, Economy Minister Amado Boudou prepared a debt swap package for the holders of over US$18 billion in bonds who did not participate in the 2005 Argentine debt restructuring. In late 2010, the largest new natural gas deposits in 35 years were discovered in Neuquén Province. The unemployment rate in the third quarter of 2011 was 7.3%.

In November 2011, the government laid a plan to cut utilities subsidies to higher income households. By mid-2011, credit was outpacing GDP by a wide margin, raising concerns that the economy was overheating. Argentina began a period of fiscal austerity in 2012. In April 2012, the government announced plans to expropriate YPF, despite the opposition of some energy experts, claiming that YPF's Spanish partner and major holder, Repsol, had not done its duty as to provide the financial support for research and land exploitation, as well as being a bad administrator concerned only in sending profits to Spain and forsaking YPF's economic growth.

Rising inflation and capital flight caused a rapid depletion of the country's dollar reserves, prompting the government to severely curtail access to dollars in June 2012. The imposition of capital controls, in turn, led to the emergence of a black market for dollars, known as the "dólar blue", at higher rates than the official exchange rate.

By May 2014, private forecasts estimated annual inflation at 39.9%, one of the highest rates in the world. In July 2014, a ruling from a New York court ordered the country to pay the remaining holders of the bonds defaulted in 2001, which by then were mostly American vulture funds, before it paid any of its exchange bondholders. The Argentine government refused, causing the country to default on its debt again.

== Economic problems since 2016 ==
=== Presidency of Mauricio Macri ===
On December 17, 2015, Macri lifted foreign exchange restrictions, leading to a 30% devaluation of the Peso, the largest since 2002. In January 2016 it was devalued to 44 cents. Unemployment reached double digits as well, with massive layoffs in the public and private sectors.

In April 2016, monthly inflation rose to 6.7%, the highest since 2002, according to the indicator, with annual inflation reaching 41.7%, one of the highest in the world. Another estimate said that inflation reached 37.4%, the fiscal deficit 4.8%, and predicted GDP would fall by 1.9%. In December 2015, the government announced the elimination of export restrictions for wheat, maize and meat, while reducing withholding taxes on soybeans to 30% at a fiscal cost of 23,604 million pesos. This led to large price increases in staple products including oil, which increased by 51%, flour 110%, chicken 90%, noodles 78%, and a 50% increase in the price of meat in two weeks. Because of a 150-180% increase in feed prices, many pig producers were in crisis. It is estimated that in the province of Buenos Aires alone, 40 thousand pork producers would fail.

One of Macri's promises during the 2015 campaign was the elimination of Income tax for workers, saying "During my government workers will not pay tax on profits". The Minister of the Economy and Public Finances, Alfonso Prat-Gay said that the draft amendments to the income tax would be sent to Congress for treatment on March 1, 2016. As of December 2017, it was not in the government's plan to eliminate the income tax.

An extremely high inflation rate was strangling the urban and rural working population: decreasing from the astounding 40% of 2016, it was expected to be 17% by 2018. Other vulnerabilities include an unemployment rate close to 9% (expected to be in two digits in the next two years), as well as the sharp rise in the current-account deficit around 3% to 4% of GDP in 2017–2018 thanks to an over-valued currency. Forecasts from the IMF show GDP growth in 2018 decelerating to 2.5% from 2.75%, and clearly any halting of the cyclical upswing in the global economy would set the country back.

=== Presidency of Alberto Fernández ===
In 2019 the inflation was considered the highest in 28 years according to the index, ascending to 53.8%. Because of the quarantine in 2020, in April, 143,000 SMEs will not be able to pay salaries and fixed expenses for the month, even with government assistance, and approximately 35,000 companies consider closing their business. Despite cuts in the payment chain, some project 180 total days and calculate 5% of companies that fell in May. In 2023, the rate of inflation in Argentina surpassed 100% for the first time since the early 1990s.

=== Presidency of Javier Milei ===
On 10 December 2023, Javier Milei, a right-wing libertarian, was sworn in as president. During the electoral campaign, inflation was at over 100 percent. At the time of Milei's inauguration, Argentina’s economy was suffering 143 percent annual inflation, the currency had plunged and four out of 10 Argentines were in poverty.

In January 2024, a study by the Catholic University of Argentina estimated that the country's poverty rate had reached 57.4%, the highest since 2004. However, by the third quarter of 2024 the Catholic University of Argentina estimated that the poverty rate had eased to 49.9% of the population, while Torcuato Di Tella University estimated that poverty stood at 36.8% of the population for the second semester of the year.

In November 2024, Argentina's monthly inflation rate slowed to 2.4%, the lowest in over four years. Annual inflation was expected to end 2024 closer to 100%. Favourable results and normalization in Argentina's economy are expected to continue in 2025. The annual inflation rate, which was 211% in 2023, is expected to be below 30% in 2025. Economic activity has also begun to recover: the economy is expected to expand by more than 4% in 2025.

In October 2025, President Javier Milei's party, La Libertad Avanza, won a landslide victory in midterm elections, making it easier for Milei to push ahead with his programme of radical spending cuts and free-market reforms.

In 2025, consumer prices rose 31.5 percent, the lowest annual inflation rate in Argentina since 2017. In 2024, Argentina recorded its first budget surplus in a decade.

== Argentine paradox ==
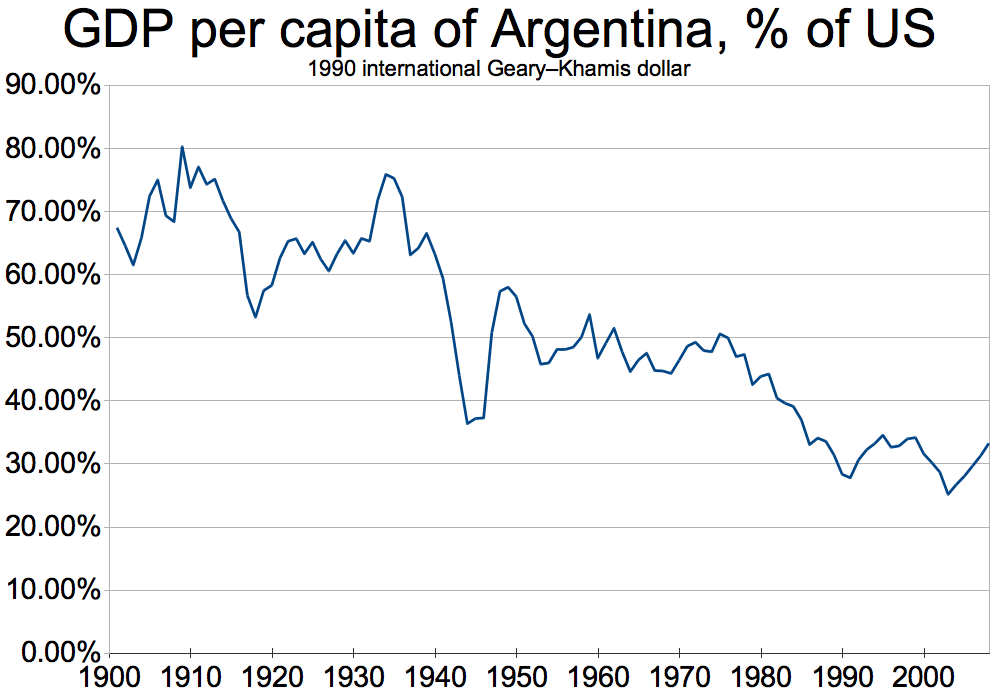
Argentina's GDP per capita (in 1990 international Geary–Khamis dollars) as a percentage of the US's, 1900–2008

The Nobel prize-winning economist Simon Kuznets is said to have remarked that there were four types of countries: the developed, the underdeveloped, Japan, and Argentina.

According to Di Tella and Zymelman, the main difference between Argentina and other settler societies such as Australia and Canada was its failure to seek adequate alternatives to compensate for the end of geographical expansion with the definitive closing of the frontier. Solberg noted the differences between the land distribution in Canada, which led to a rising number of small farmers, and the smaller number of landowners each with larger areas of land in Argentina.

Duncan and Fogarty argued that the key difference lies in the contrast between the stable, flexible government of Australia and the poor governance of Argentina. According to Platt and Di Tella the political tradition and immigration from different regions were the key factors, while Díaz Alejandro suggested that a restrictive immigration policy, similar to Australia's, would have increased productivity encouraged by the relative scarcity of labor.

Taylor pointed out that the relatively high dependency ratio and the slow demographic transition in Argentina led to a reliance on foreign capital to offset the resulting low savings rate. From the 1930s onwards, the accumulation of capital was hampered by the relatively high prices of (mostly imported) capital goods, which was caused by the industrial policy of import substitution, in contrast with the export-led growth favored by Canada. Other distorting factors behind the high relative prices of capital goods include the multiple exchange rates, the black market for foreign currencies, the depreciation of the national currency and high customs tariffs. This resulted in a lower capital intensity, which led to lower rates of labor productivity.

== See also ==
- British investment in Argentina
- History of agriculture in Argentina
- Latin American debt crisis
- Economic history of Latin America
- Economy of Argentina
