= MLCD =

MLCD may refer to:

- Market-linked CD, a type of certificate of deposit
- Marine Life Conservation District - see Molokini
- Modèle Lagrangien à courte distance - see List of atmospheric dispersion models
- station code for Moolchand metro station, Delhi, India
