= Time deposit =

Bank account with a fixed maturity date

A time deposit or term deposit (also known as a certificate of deposit in the United States, and as a guaranteed investment certificate in Canada) is a deposit in a financial institution with a specific maturity date or a period to maturity, commonly referred to as its "term". Time deposits differ from at call deposits, such as savings or checking accounts, which can be withdrawn at any time, without any notice or penalty. Deposits that require notice of withdrawal to be given are effectively time deposits, though they do not have a fixed maturity date.

Unlike a certificate of deposit and bonds, a time deposit is generally not negotiable; it is not transferable by the depositor, so that depositors need to deal with the financial institution when they need to prematurely cash out of the deposit.

Time deposits enable the bank to invest the funds in higher-earning financial products. In some countries, including the United States, time deposits are not subject to the banks’ reserve requirements, on the basis that the funds cannot be withdrawn at short notice. In some countries, time deposits are guaranteed by the government or protected by deposit insurance.

== Interest ==
Time deposits normally earn interest, which is normally fixed for the duration of the term and payable upon maturity, though some may be paid periodically during the term, especially with longer-term deposits. Generally, the longer the term and the larger the deposit amount the higher the interest rate that will be offered.

The interest paid on a time deposit tends to be higher than on an at-call savings account, but tends to be lower than that of riskier products such as stocks or bonds. Some banks offer market-linked time deposit accounts which offer potentially higher returns while guaranteeing principal.

== At maturity ==
At maturity, the principal can be either paid back to the depositor (usually by a deposit into a bank account designated by the depositor) or rolled over for another term. Interest may be paid into the same account as the principal or to another bank account or rolled over with the principal to the next term.

The money deposited normally can be withdrawn before maturity, but a significant penalty will normally be payable.

== See also ==
- Federal Deposit Insurance Corporation
- Canada Deposit Insurance Corporation
- Guaranteed investment certificate
- Money supply
