= Guaranteed investment certificate =

Canadian investment

A guaranteed investment certificate (GIC, French: certificat de placement garanti, CPG) is a Canadian investment that offers a guaranteed rate of return over a fixed period of time, most commonly issued by trust companies or banks. Due to its low risk profile, the return is generally less than other investments such as stocks, bonds, or mutual funds. It is similar to a time or term deposit as it is known in other countries.

== Overview ==
The rate of return on a GIC varies depending on the various factors, such as the length of the term and specified interest rates from the Bank of Canada. At the time of purchase, the rate is higher than the interest on a savings account. The return on the investment will be low if the savings interest rate becomes higher than the GIC rate of return and will be high otherwise.

The principal amount is not at risk unless the bank defaults. The guarantee for GICs is provided by the Canada Deposit Insurance Corporation (CDIC) up to a maximum of $100,000 (principal and interest combined), as long as the issuing financial institution is a CDIC member and the original term to maturity is five years or less.

== Market growth GICs ==
The market growth GICs or market stock-indexed GICs have their interest rates determined by the rate of growth of a specific stock market (such as the TSX or S&P 500). For example; if the TSX has a market growth increase of 30% in three years, beginning at the same point in time the GIC was issued, the GIC will return with an interest of 30%. However, unlike other GICs there is always a possibility that the market could perform poorly, having even no growth at all, in which the interest rate could return at 0%. Just like regular GICs, market growth GICs are extremely low-risk; the capital is guaranteed to remain intact (though the purchasing power is not) even if the stock market shrinks.

All market growth GICs have a maximum return. For example; if the GIC has a maximum return of 25% over three years, and the TSX has a market growth increase of 30% in three years, the GIC will return with an interest rate of only 25%. Maximum returns will typically range from 7% to 15% per year, depending on the market in which the GIC is invested and the length of the investment term.

== See also ==
- Certificate of deposit, a similar investment in the United States
- Time deposit
- List of Banks and credit unions in Canada
