= Market-linked CD =

A market-linked CD (MLCD) is also referred to as an equity-linked CD, market-indexed CD, or simply an indexed CD as well. It is a specific type of certificate of deposit that is linked to the performance of one or more securities or market indexes, like the S&P 500. Additionally, the term length is usually much longer, with periods ranging over many years rather than several months.

Not all investors are as familiar with this type of certificate of deposit as compared to conventional CDs and similar deposit accounts because market-linked CDs are not as common. New York Times writer, Leonard Sloane, explains, "only a few financial institutions have created such certificates, [though] many others are testing or considering similar products."

Market-linked CDs are also a type of "structured" investment, which means they are created in order to meet an investor's specific financial goals. They combine the long-term growth potential of equity or other markets with the security of a traditional certificate of deposit.

== History ==
Prior to the full repeal of the Glass–Steagall Act in 1999, traditional banks were prohibited from offering investment mutual funds to customers. Eager to increase their competitiveness with non-banks, traditional banks began experimenting with FDIC-insured products that would combine the safety of principal preservation with the growth of market-based returns.

The first market-linked CD was offered by Chase Manhattan Bank in March 1987.

== How MLCDs work ==
A Market-linked CD's performance is dependent upon the performance of a market or index. As the market goes up, so does the CD's potential return. Conversely, if the value of the market or index falls, the return on the market-linked CD will, too. Some issuers of market-linked CDs guarantee a base return to guard against a zero return should interest rates fall, though this is not always the case. There is a possibility of earning no interest during an economic downturn.

=== Participation rate ===
The participation rate is the percentage at which a market-linked CD's annual return will correspond to the performance of the index it is tied to. For example, an index sees a 20 percent gain, but the indexed CD has a participation rate of 80 percent. The CD will produce a return of 16 percent, which is 80 percent of 20 percent. The participation rate can be below, at or above 100 percent.

=== Interest cap ===
In order to protect a bank or similar issuing financial institution from paying too much in interest should rates skyrocket, a cap is usually placed on how much interest an investor can earn. Again, if the market-linked CD with a 16 percent return had an interest cap of 10 percent, investors would only earn a 10 percent return.

=== Call risk ===
Many market-linked CDs have a call and liquidity feature. This allows the issuing bank to redeem the CD before it matures. The call price determines how much interest the investor earns. Many investors can receive a premium over par value when liquidating the market-linked CD.

== Calculation of return ==
There are several methods that can be used to calculate a market-linked CD's return. It is up to the issuing financial institution to determine how the rate will be computed. The two most common ways a market-linked CD's return is calculated are averaging and point-to-point.

=== Average ===
Rather than calculating the return based on a starting and ending point, the values of the index along several "observation points", or dates, are averaged.

=== Point-to-point ===
The return on a market-linked CD using this method is based on the difference between two points, or values. The starting point is the value of the index when the CD is issued and the ending point is the value of the index on a particular date just before maturity. The return can be the difference, or a percentage of the difference.

== Taxation ==
There are special tax implications of this particular investment that differ from traditional certificates of deposit. Usually, index-based investment income is taxed according to the rate for capital gains, which is limited to 15 percent. In contrast, returns on an index CD is considered interest income and taxed at the holder's ordinary income rate. In addition, market-linked CDs owners have to pay taxes on "phantom income" on an annual basis, regardless of whether the CD has matured or not. Holding a market-linked CD in a tax-deferred account, such as an individual retirement account (IRA), can avoid paying taxes on earnings.

== Advantages and disadvantages ==
=== Risk aversion ===
When an investor purchases an array of stocks, bonds and mutual funds, there is nothing preventing a loss of every penny should markets plummet. However, most issuers of market-linked CDs offer principal protection. This means that the initial investment is protected from downturns in the market, but only when the CD is held until maturity.

=== FDIC insurance ===
There are a few exceptions, but almost all market-linked CDs are protected by the Federal Deposit Insurance Corporation according to current guidelines. However, only the principal amount is insured and not the interest.

=== Diversification ===
Market-linked CDs invest in more than one index or security and diversify assets. This is important because, as the U.S. Securities and Exchange Commission explains, "By investing in more than one asset category, you'll reduce the risk that you'll lose money and your portfolio's overall investment returns will have a smoother ride."

=== Liquidity ===
Every investor faces a financial penalty if money is withdrawn from a certificate of deposit before maturity. However, because an indexed CD is tied to the market, early withdrawal becomes even more problematic. Any possible future return can be canceled out by early withdrawal penalties.
