= Allegorical representations of Argentina =

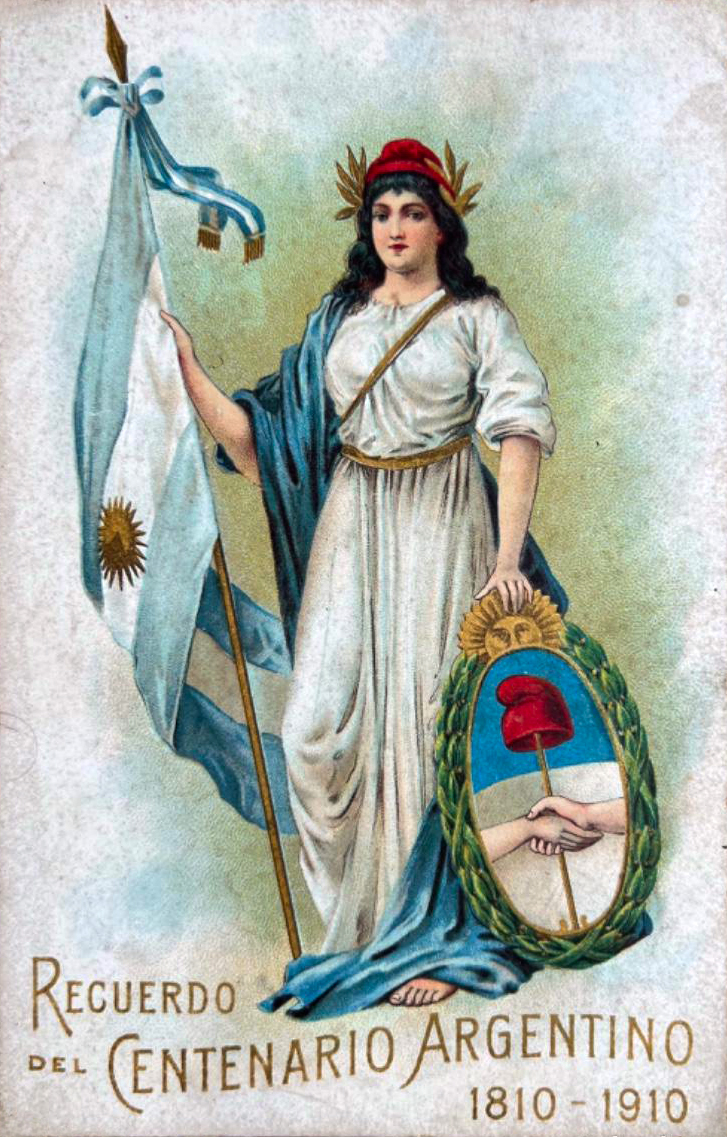
The Liberty of Oudiné in memory of the Argentine centenary of the May Revolution (1810-1910).

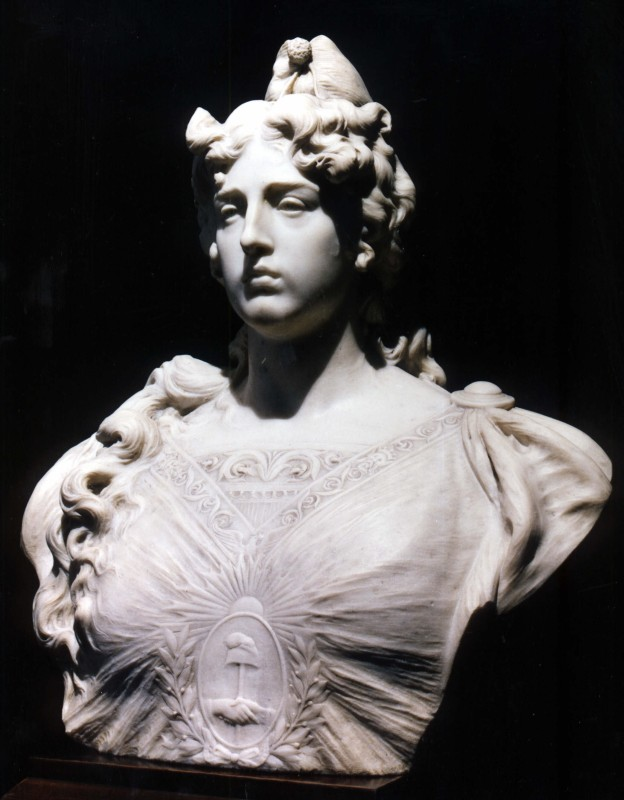
The Argentine Republic allegorized by Ettore Ximenes in 1900; Note that in the place of the heart the Argentina Shield is sculpted.

There are various allegorical representations of Argentina or associated in any way with Argentina. There is not, however, a national personification with its own name, like Marianne from France, or Hispania from Spain, but sculptures and engravings representing liberty, republic, motherland or other concepts that have been used officially by the Argentine state. The allegory is represented in most cases by a young woman called the Liberty of Oudiné, dressed in a kind of tunic, with a light skin and flowing brown or black wavy hair. She usually wears a red Phrygian cap, an emblem of liberty. When the allegory of Argentina is depicted, her tunic and overtunic almost always bear the colors of the Argentine flag.

== Sculptures ==
Despite the absence of a character with fixed traits, the allegory of Argentina is usually a female figure dressed in robes and wearing a Phrygian cap, which also appears on the Argentine coat of arms. Figures such as these appear in dozens of engravings, reliefs, plaques, paintings, memorials and sculptures. Some of the memorials that include an allegorical representation of Argentina are the "Monumento Nacional a la Bandera" in Rosario, the "Monumento de los Españoles" in Palermo, the "Monumento al Guardacostas" in Puerto Madero, the "Monumento a la Gesta de Malvinas" in Quequén and the "Monumento al Ejército de Los Andes" in Mendoza, among others. An allegorical representation is also figurehead of the ARA Libertad, the flagship of the Argentine Navy. Allegories regularly appeared in official memorabilia for the Centenary celebrations, as well as a prominent decorative feature in state buildings and logos of government departments at the turn of the century.

=== May Pyramid ===
The May Pyramid was remodeled in 1856 under the artistic direction of Prilidiano Pueyrredón who commissioned the French artist Joseph Dubourdieu to build what the press of that period defined "a colossal statue of Liberty". Inaugurated a few days before the anniversary of May Revolution, the statue represents a figure very similar to the representation of the goddess Athena, crowned with a Phrygian cap, armed with a spear in one hand and an Argentine shield as a defense in the other one. Although most sources mention the statue as an allegory of Liberty, in a publication of the Historic and Numismatic Museum of the Central Bank of Argentina, is considered an allegory of the Republic.

=== Bust in the White Hall ===
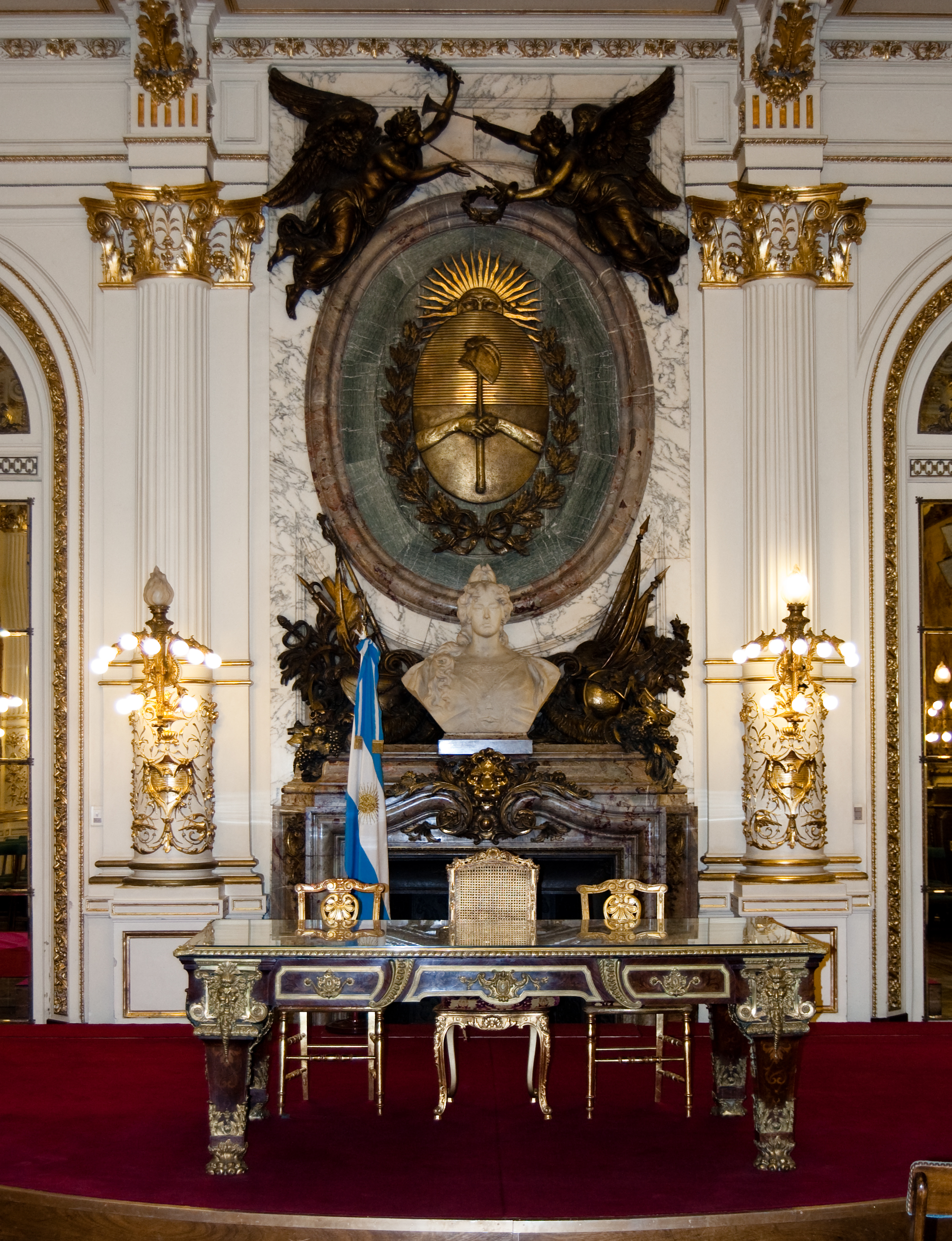
View of The Republic, White Hall, Government House.

Chairing the White Hall in the Casa Rosada, where traditional ceremonies and important announcements related to the executive branch are made, a bust of a woman with thick hair and the Coat of Arms of Argentina as a brooch in her chest is located. The work, done by Italian sculptor Ettore Ximenes, is entitled "The Republic", but others consider it a bust of "Motherland".

=== Mausoleum of General San Martín ===
In 1880, the remains of General José de San Martín were brought from France and placed in a mausoleum inside the Buenos Aires Metropolitan Cathedral. The black sarcophagus is guarded by three life-size female figures that represent Argentina, Chile and Peru, three of the regions freed by the General.

== Monetary emissions ==
The first representation of an allegorical figure to appear on Argentine banknotes was the goddess Athena (historical symbol of Athenian democracy), commissioned by the National Bank of the United Provinces of the Río de la Plata during the Cisplatine War. The Greek goddess also appeared in banknotes issued by the National Bank during the governorship of Juan Manuel de Rosas in the Buenos Aires Province. However, the first figure to transmit a sense of regionality is displayed in a series of banknotes printed by Britain and emitted by the Bank of the Province of Buenos Aires in 1867, where a young woman is seen holding a shovel in her left hand and a shepherd's crook in her right hand (representations of agriculture and animal husbandry, respectively).

In some of the first peso moneda nacional banknotes, various unidentified female figures showing her legs or her chest appear, "as the seductive image of a State that attracts citizens via women". The monetary reorganization, that begun during the first presidency of Julio Argentino Roca, imposed the use of designs which were developed as to have a greater permanence in time. Two allegorical figures present in the first unified issues of currency and banknotes, the Bust of Liberty and the Effigy of Progress, would be recurring in later releases.

=== Bust of Liberty ===
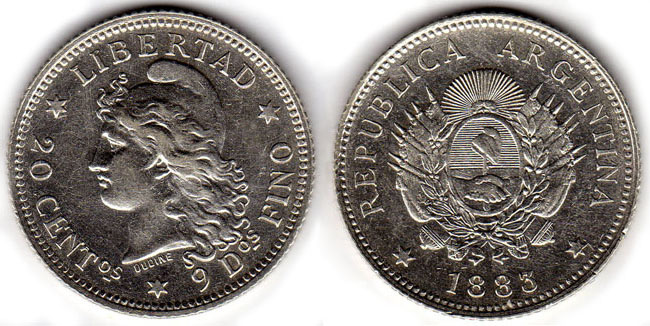
The Liberty of Oudiné in the flip of a coin of twenty cents m$n, 1883.

One of the most recurrent figures in Argentine currency is the Effigy of Liberty by the French artist Eugène André Oudiné, which shows the profile of a woman with a serene face, abundant hair loose to the wind and a Phrygian cap. Oudiné carved his Effigy of Liberty in 1881, by order of the engineer Eduardo Castilla, first president of the Casa de Moneda, to illustrate the reverse of the coins of the peso moneda nacional, whose creation was enacted that same year to unify the monetary system of country. The Liberty of Oudiné was present in monetary emissions without interruption until 1942, when it was replaced by a modern bust made in 1940 by French sculptor Lucien Bazor. However, it reappears in the emission of 1957, and is present in subsequent designs of peso ley, peso argentino and austral.

A slightly different version appears on the banknotes of fifty cents m$n, in circulation between 1942 and 1960. This effigy can be compared with the design of Oudiné, and considered inspired by Liberty Leading the People. The Liberty of Oudiné also appears in the logo of the Central Bank of Argentina, and the former company Gas del Estado. It is also used in the seals of the Internal Revenue law present in cigarette packs.

=== Effigy of Progress ===
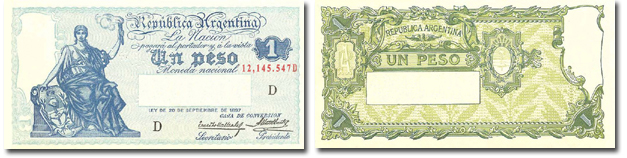
Effigy of Progress on 1 m$n banknote, 1903

Another common allegorical figure, in this on banknotes, is an Effigy of Progress which features a woman sitting, holding an Argentine shield with one hand and a lighted torch with the other. The design, which is usually attributed to the French writer Louis-Eugène Mouchon was carried out for illustrating the front of the peso moneda nacional banknotes as a result of Act. 3505 of 1897, which authorized the Caja de Conversión to renew and unify all paper currencies in the period. The Effigy of Progress would be present in all series of banknotes by the Caja de Conversión from 1899 until 1935, when it was replaced by the Central Bank of Argentina, and will not be replaced until 1942, when the Central Bank made its first series of banknotes. The same figure, surrounded by laurels, reappears half a century later on the back of all austral banknotes.

Apart from being identified with Progress, whose formalization is posterior, the figure was initially interpreted as an Effigy of the Republic.

== Bicentennial celebrations ==
During the festivities and celebrations of the Argentine bicentennial, the young actresses Josefina Torino and Ivanna Carrizo interpreted the figure of Motherland. The artists were inspired by several sculptures, including the statue of the Republic on the frontispiece of the Museo Histórico Sarmiento. The production looked specifically for two actresses with mestizo features, as a way to include indigenous peoples in Argentina in the representation

== Gallery ==
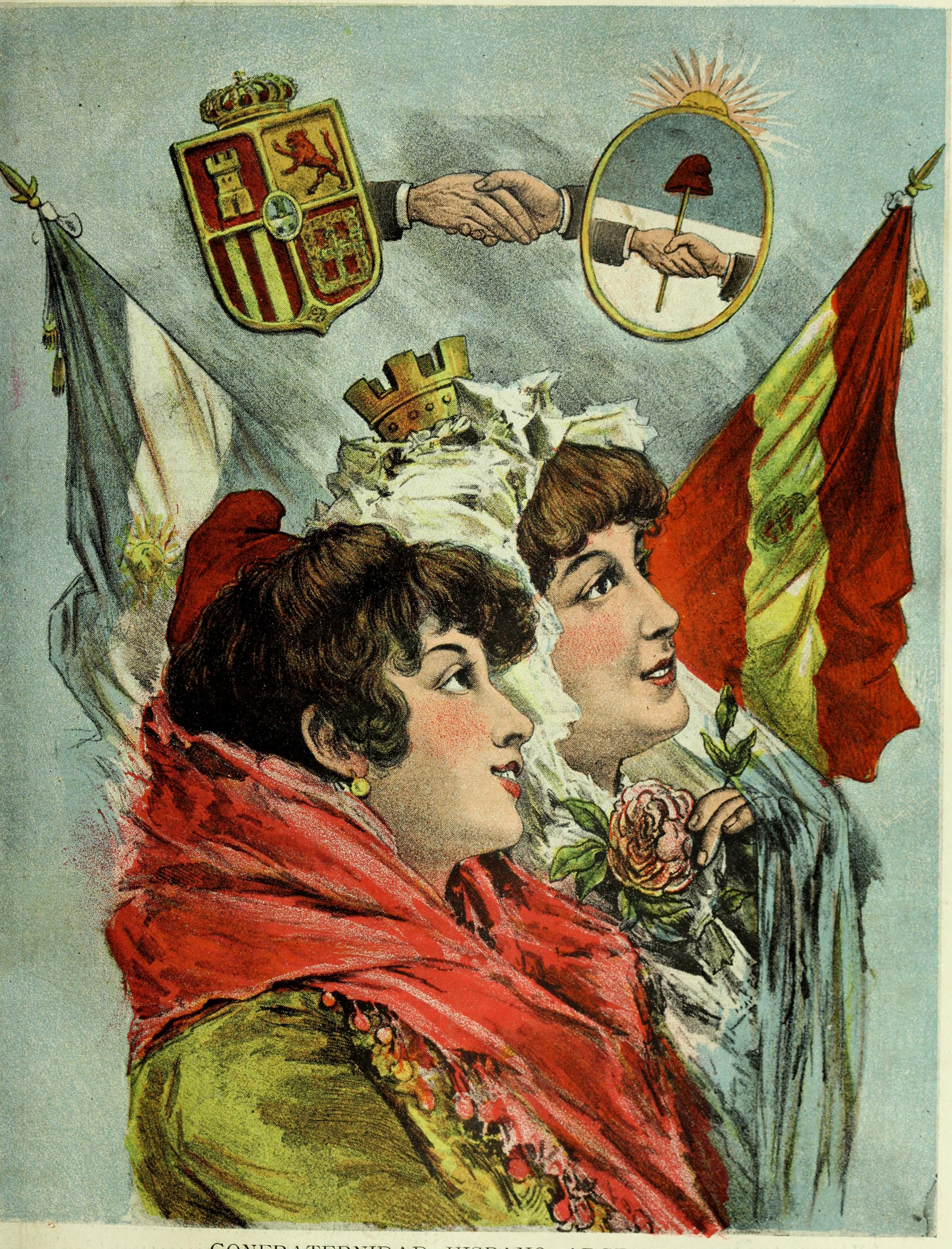
The Spanish-Argentine brotherhood in 1900 portrayed by the Liberty of Oudiné and Hispania.

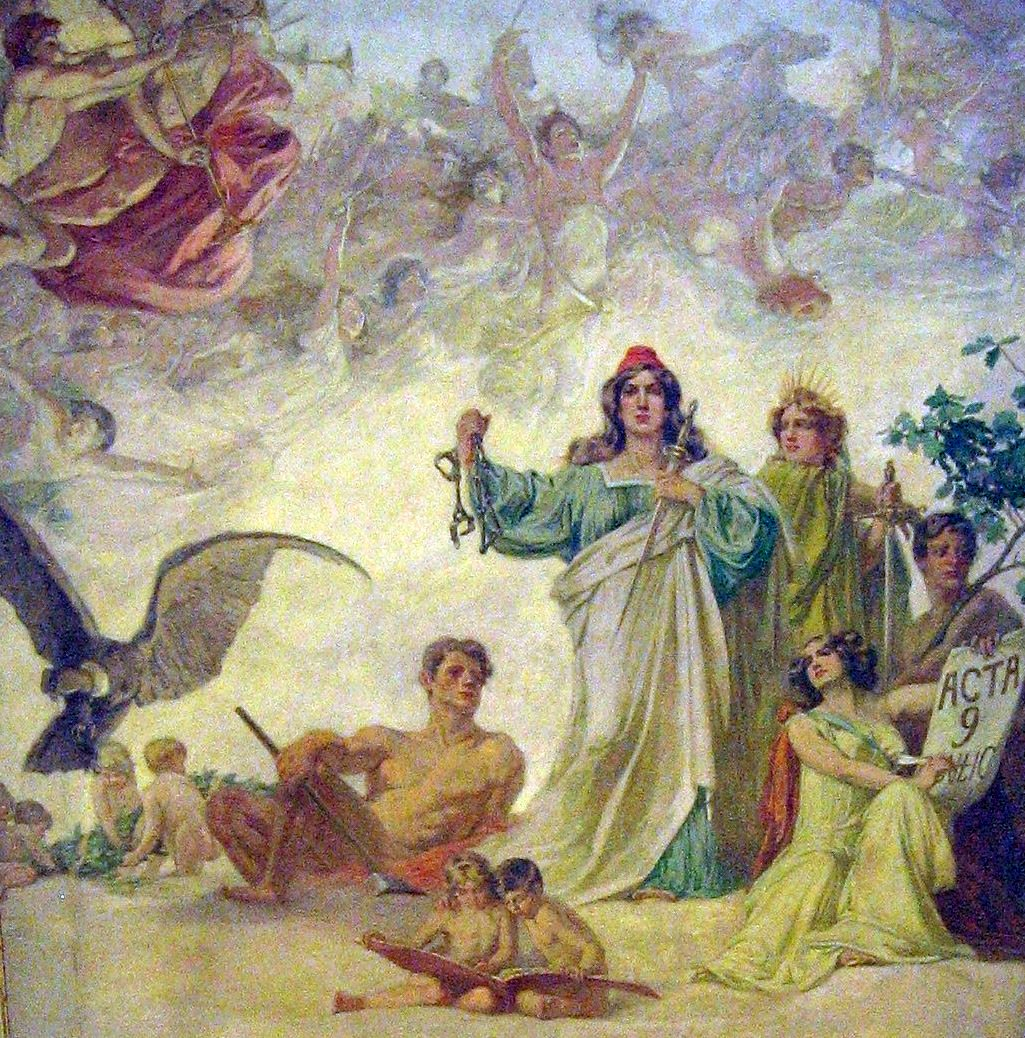
Painting on canvas on the ceiling of the White Hall in the Casa Rosada with allegories of the May Revolution and the Declaration of Independence.

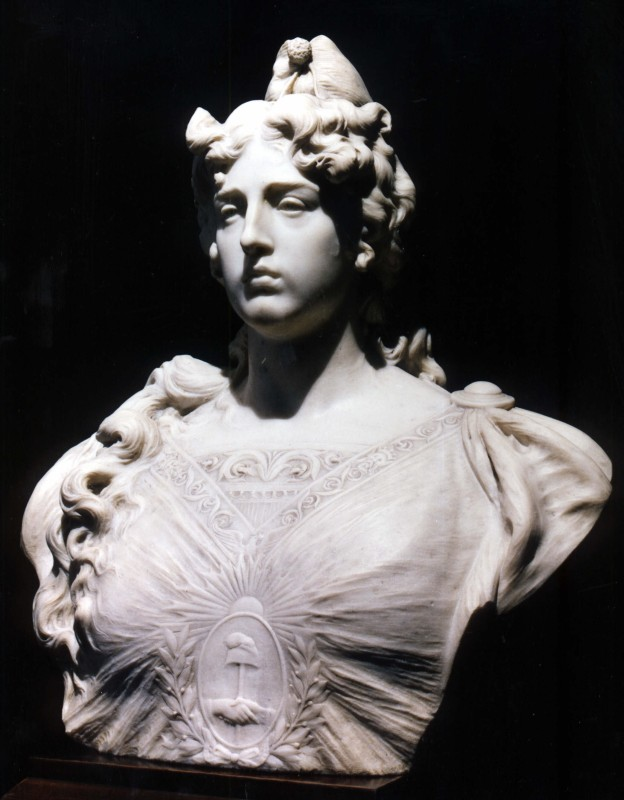
La repubblica Argentina, 1900 by Ettore Ximenes.

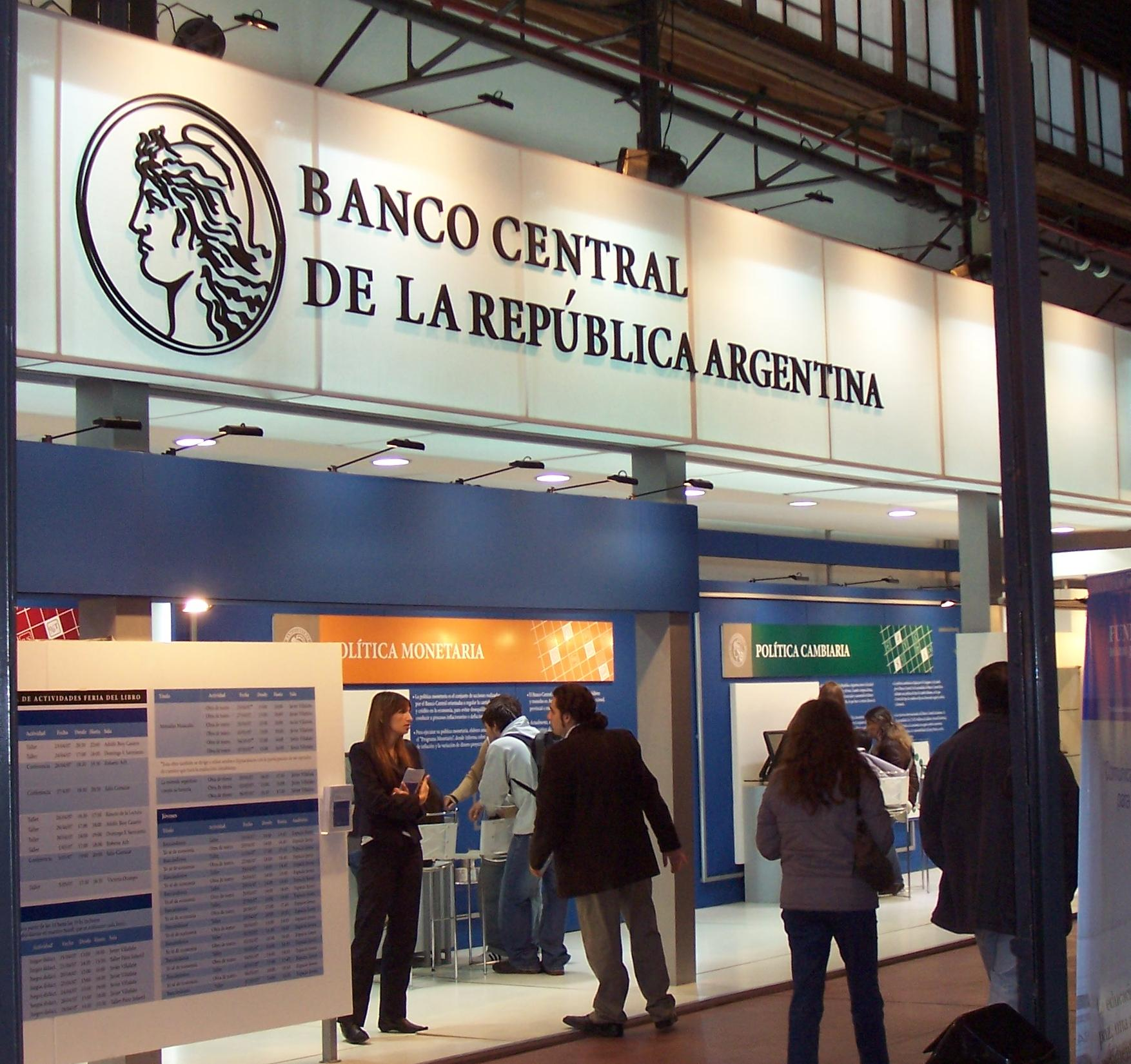
The Liberty of Oudiné in the logo for the Central Bank of Argentina.

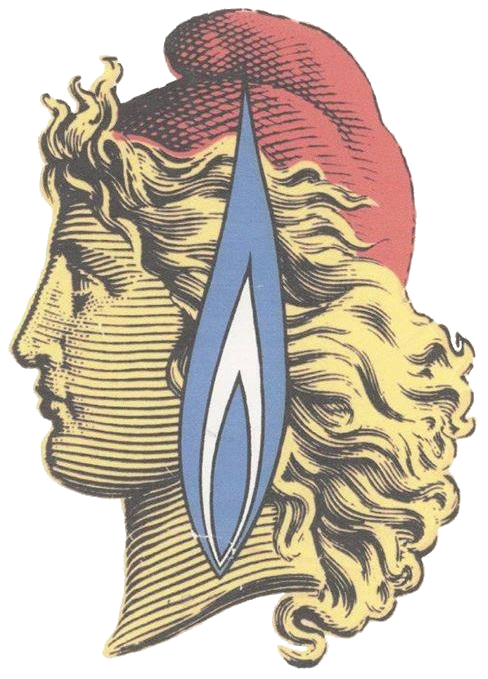
The same figure was used for the logo of Gas del Estado.

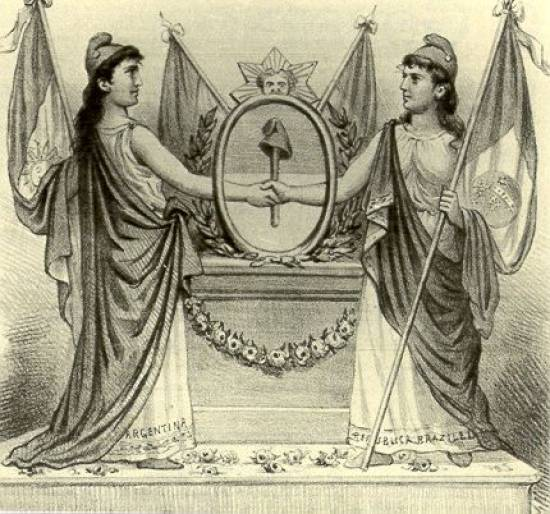
This 1890 allegoric drawing depicts the friendship between the Argentine Republic and the newly formed Brazilian Republic.

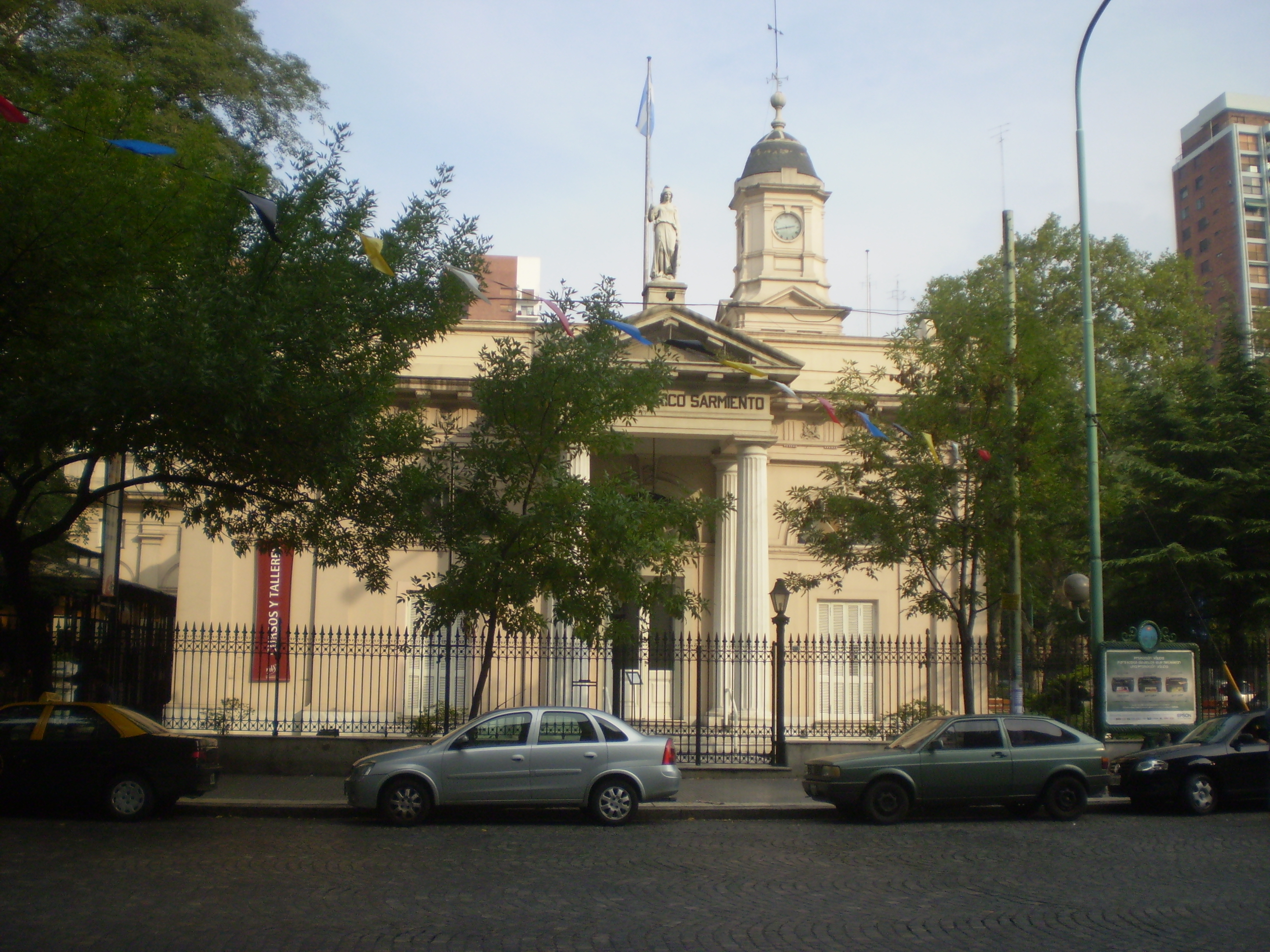
Allegoric sculpture of the Republic in the Sarmiento Historical Museum.

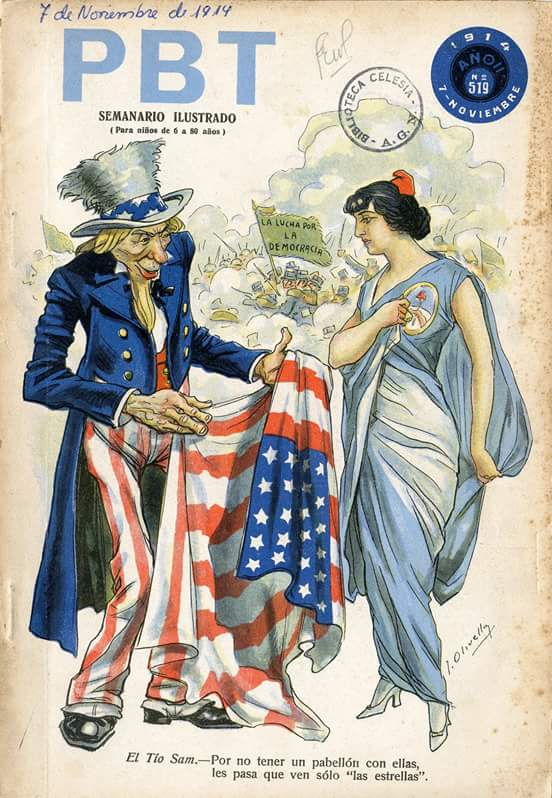
Cover of Argentine magazine PBT n° 519 about relations between the USA and Argentina in 1914, featuring the Uncle Sam and the Liberty of Oudiné.

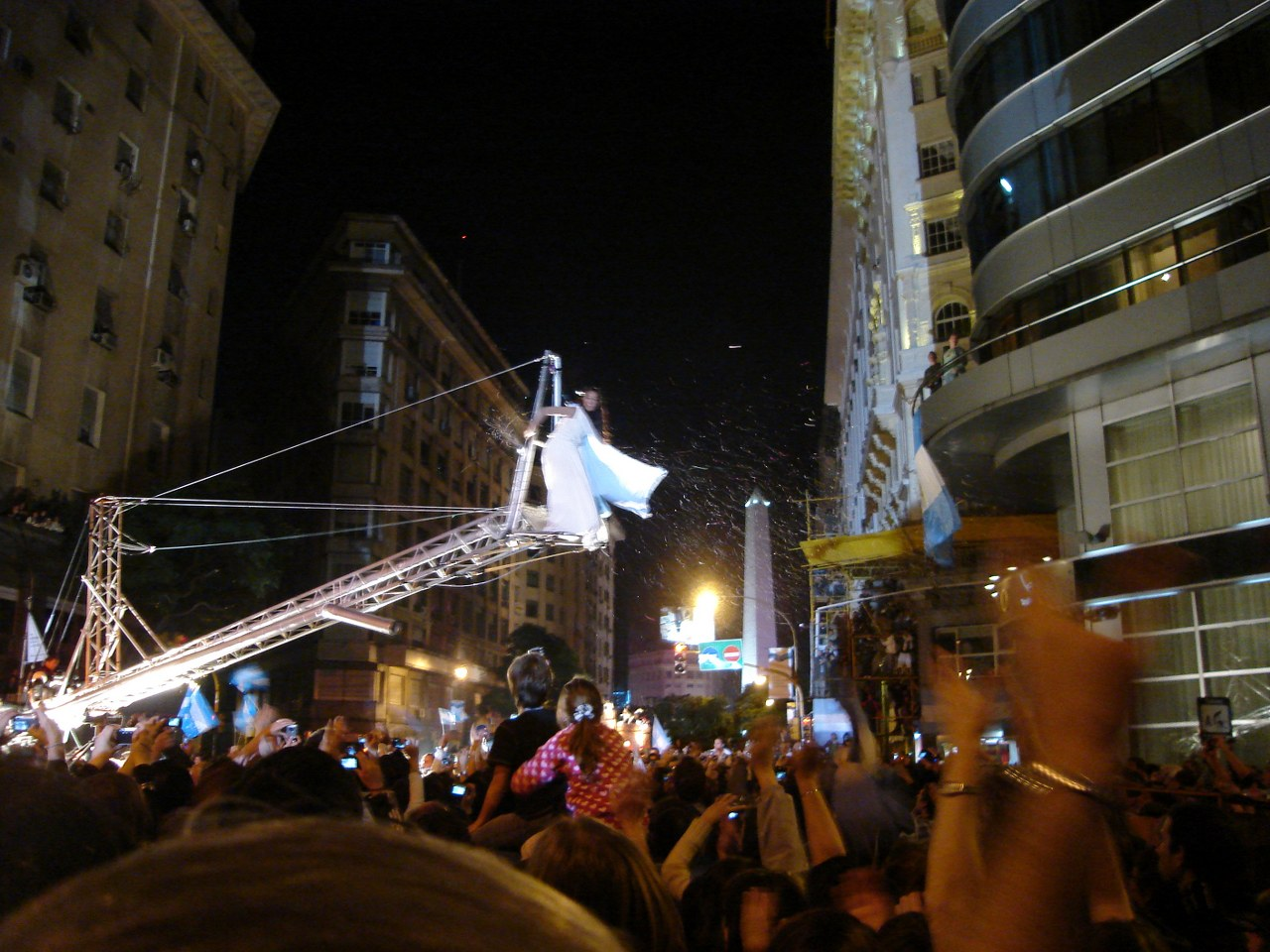
Representation of Homeland during the festivities of the Bicentennial of May Revolution.

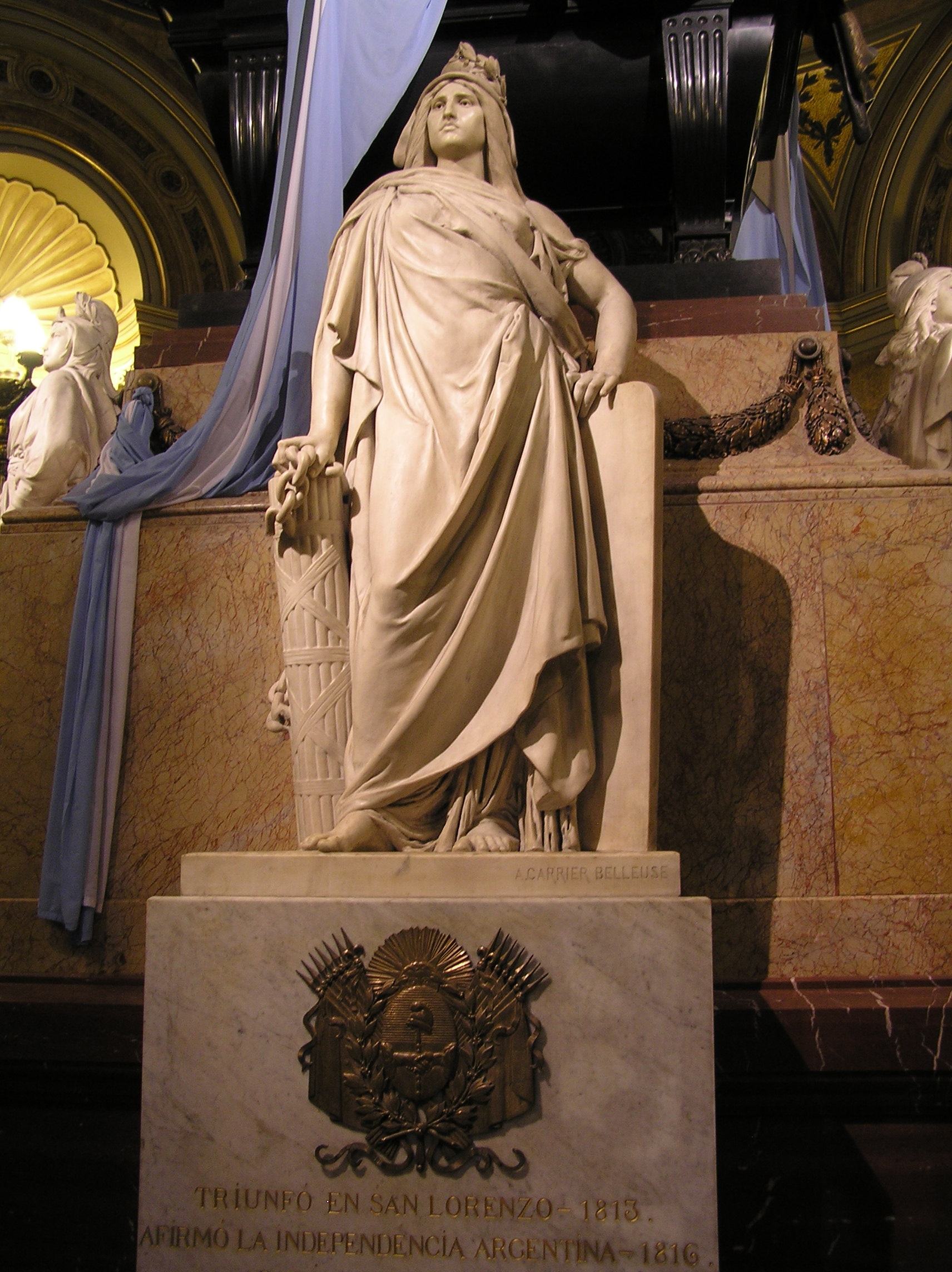
Sculpture representing Argentina in the Mausoleum of General Don José de San Martín.

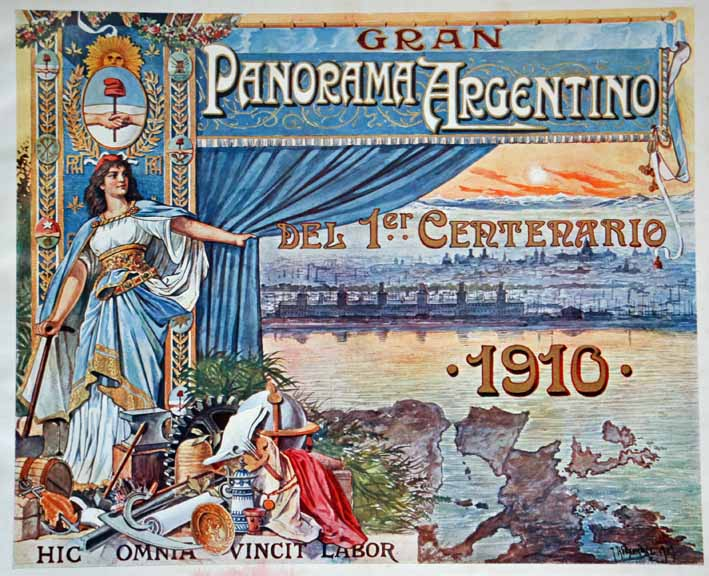
Argentine Panorama magazine, published in 1910 as part of the Centennial's commemorations of May Revolution.

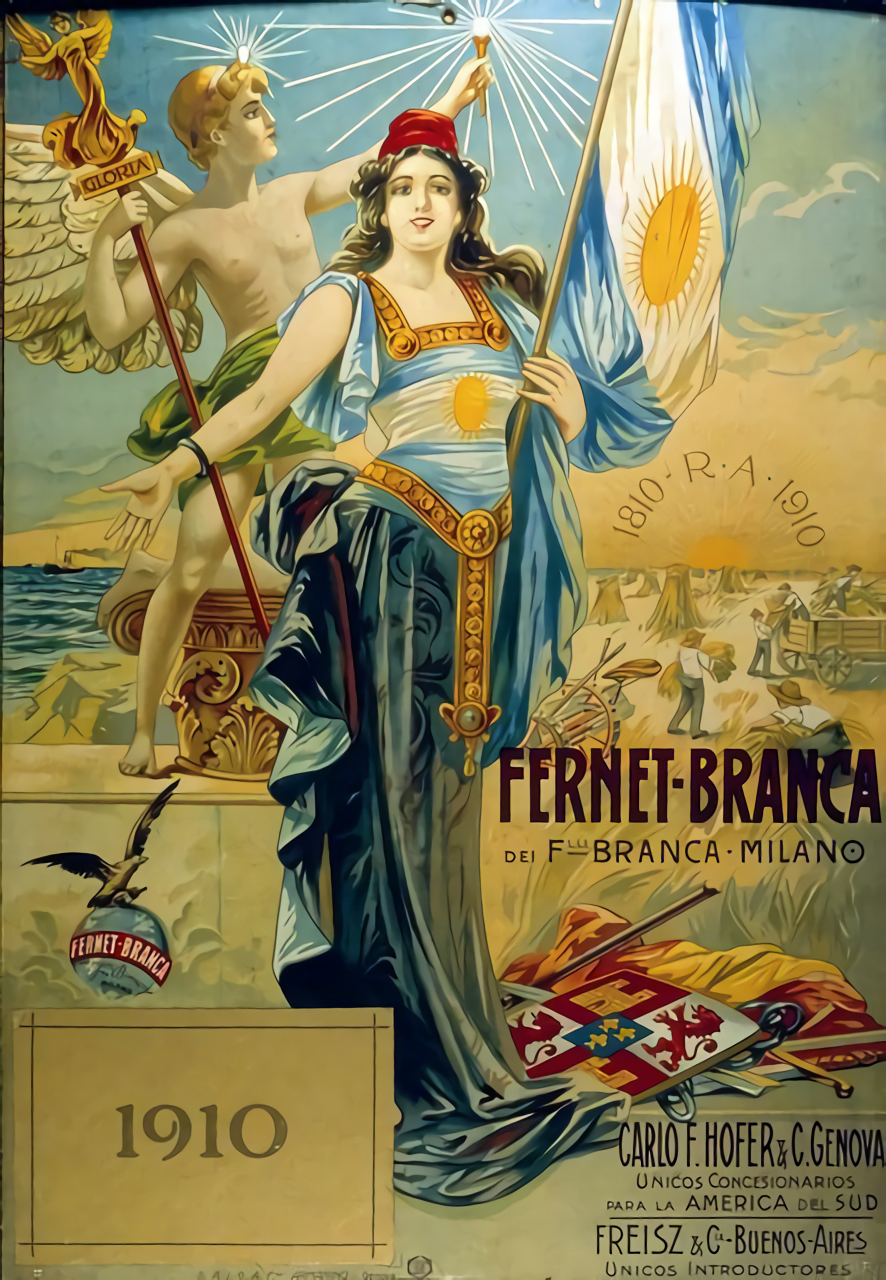
Advertisement for Fernet Branca celebrating the Centennial.

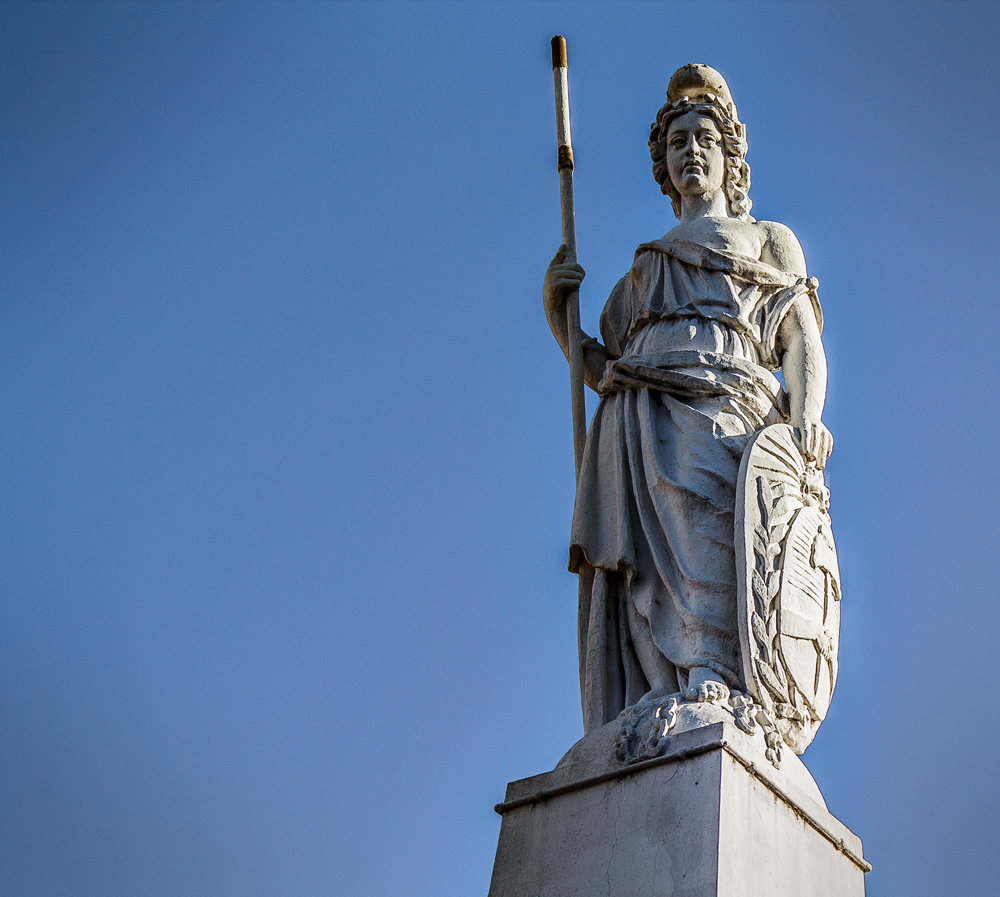
Statue of Liberty at the top of the May Pyramid, inaugurated in 1856. She holds an Argentine shield in her left hand.

== See also ==
- National personification
- Gaucho
- Allegory of Hispania
- Marianne
- Liberty Leading the People
