= BONEX Plan =

The BONEX Plan was a forced conversion of bank time deposits to Treasury bonds performed by the Argentine government in January 1990.

It was put in place following a 3079,5% hyperinflation in 1989, as heterodox stabilization programs failed. US$3 billion worth of the public's deposits were converted to "Bonex 89" bonds to be repaid in 1999. It amounted to a partial default from the Central Bank and Treasury to commercial banks, who in turn partially defaulted into their depositors.

It was caused by the government's political inability to undertake rigorous fiscal reforms, and a monetary sterilization policy which generated a major 'quasi fiscal' deficit to the Central Bank, further fueling a long-standing high inflation rate. Its high debt made the Central Bank lost most of its capacity to carry out independent monetary policy.

A freezing of deposits was also undertaken in neighbor country Brazil at the time, during the Plano Collor.

== Background ==
In 1985, then-president Raúl Alfonsín created the Austral Plan, a shock plan to reduce inflation which replaced the Peso argentino currency with the Austral, on a 1000:1 rate. Initially successful, lowering inflation from a 350% in the first half of 1985 to slightly more than 20% in the second half, it led to Alfonsín winning the 1985 midterm elections. However, as the main price anchors of the program were relaxed, inflation began to rise again, contributing to the government defeat in the 1987 midterm elections. This opposition's (Justicialist Party) legislative strength would make any public expenditure cuts or tax increases required difficult.

A big motor of the rising inflation rate was the Central Bank's own 'quasi fiscal' deficit. During the 1980s, the institution had been absorbing money by issuing interest-bearing debt. As interest rates were liberalized in October 1987 to maintain commercial banks' profitability, the Central Bank's efforts to absorb money increased its own interest bill, making borrowing requirements the main source of money creation. The Bank then slipped into distress, left with no choice but to monetize first the interest on its debt, and then the principal, fueling hyperinflation and decapitalizing the Central Bank, as its liabilities grew faster than its liquid-asset backing. This has been described as a fast-motion version of the 'unpleasant monetarist arithmetic' outlined by Sargent and Wallace.

In 1988, a new economic plan, the Primavera Plan, was approved by Alfonsín to stabilize the Argentine economy, which had been suffering a high inflation rate for years now. It was tried from February 1989 to July 1989, but failed. As the economy went off control, Alfonsín —whose party had lost the Presidency in the snap May elections to the Justicialist Carlos Menem — had to turn power five months in advance of the constitutional transition date, amid riots. This political uncertainty also contributed to hyperinflation, which rose 197% in June 1989.

The country now had a balance of payments deficit, a budget deficit, a big state debt (in an international context of rising interest rates), and rapidly decreasing Central Bank reserves, as it tried to contain the currency depreciation.

1989-1990 Economy of Argentina
	1989	1990
Public Sector Balance (as a percentage of GDP)	-21.8%	-3.3%
Primary Result	-3.66%	-3.08%
Annual Inflation Rate	4,923.6%	1,343.9%

The Menem administration established a new stabilization plan, called Bunge & Born Plan (also known as BB Plan), as several members of the economic cabinet were former Bunge & Born executives. The new Peronist government had a working legislative majority that helped it pass emergency legislation, authorizing public companies privatizations and tax reforms. A stand-by line was negotiated with the IMF. The plan worked, lowering inflation to a single-digit monthly rate, until December 1989, when a second hiperinflationary episode emerged.

As interest rates skyrocketed, reaching a 400% annual rate for 30-day time deposits in 1989, the public saved only the minimum cash they required for living and created deposits (which could be set for a minimum 7-day period, instead of the nowadays 30-day minimum) with their remaining income, to protect themselves from inflation. Banks then on-lent deposits to the Treasury and Central Bank at high yields, cutting lending to productive sectors. However, these high interest rates increased the public sector borrowing requirement. Public debt interest was financed by further borrowing, which resulted again in further interest rate increases to induce the economy to hold the growing debt stocks. In 1989, the M1 money supply had risen by a 4,101.4%. This was a consequence of the lagging exchange rate depreciation and high interest rate on deposits, which generated enormous interest flows that were capitalized into the deposit stocks.

At this time, ATMs were not common in Argentina, and wages were usually paid in cash. Price and wage de facto indexation was common practice, enhancing the effects of any inflationary shock. Fearing further devaluations, withdrawal demand increased, worsening commercial banks' illiquidity.

By October 1989, a new premium with the parallel foreign exchange market emerged, Central Bank tightening policy failed to eliminate the premium, and taxes were raised to increase non-interest surplus. The M4 broad money stock grew from US$2.9 billion in June 1989 to 7.5 billion in November 1989, parallel premium kept raising, forcing a new devaluation of the Austral, from 655 to 1000₳ per dollar. A new run on the Argentine currency took place in December 1989. This ended the Bunge & Born Plan, forcing Minister of Economy Néstor Rapanelli to resign. A new floating exchange rate system was put in place, and price controls were lifted. This caused a vicious cycle of depreciation, surging prices, and soaring interest rates. The IMF stand-by programme was interrupted during the December 1989 hyperinflation. By the end of 1989, the official floating exchange rate had reached 1,800₳ per dollar, with the parallel rate reaching 4,000₳ per dollar.

1989-1990 Monthly Inflation Rates
	1989	1990		
	December	January	February	March
Inflation Rate	40%	79%	61%	95%

== Development and deployment ==
To halt a new hyperinflation, the Ministry of Economy —now headed by Antonio Erman González— forced the conversion of time deposits into BONEX 89 treasury bonds (Spanish: BONos EXteriores, External Bonds), to be repaid in 1999. It was approved by presidential decree, and announced on a press conference on December 28. The Treasury would issue BONEX bonds to the Central Bank (around US$3 billion), who would then pay off banks' inaccessible deposits with BONEX, and the commercial banks would then pay the depositors. Only 1 million ₳ (about US$500) per account would be given back in cash to the public, following several days of bank holiday, with the remaining funds being converted to bonds. Additional amounts could be exempted from the conversion, only if the depositor could prove that the funds were to be used for tax or payroll payments.

M2 money supply tumbled down from 18% of GDP in 1986 to 3.1% after the conversion. Time deposits were temporary disallowed, and the Treasury converted most of its own outstanding domestic debt into BONEX. The refinancing of public debt made possible lowering the 'quasi fiscal' deficit. This sudden drop in liquidity lowered inflation, and even produced a few days of deflation.

The BONEX 89 bonds started trading under par, a discount price 50% under its face value. The public initiated lawsuits to the Argentine State and the Central Bank, questioning the constitutionality of the forced conversion, but in December 1990 the Supreme Court —on the Peralta, Luis Arcenio y otro c/Estado Nacional case— validated the presidential decrees, stating the measures were a proper response to a severe social risk situation.

In March 1990, the government announced new fiscal measures: It stopped the export refunds benefit, halted all public invitations to tender and government purchases, as well as reducing the administrative structure of the government.

Inflation revived to the ends of January 1990, amid rumors of dollarization. Government raised public-service prices, and increased taxes during February 1990. Exchange rate went from 1,865₳ per dollar at the end of January to 5,965₳ at the end of February.

A new fiscal programme was announced on 4 March 1990, including: a raise on taxes, a tightening in public expenditure, and a reduction in public employment, and the suspension of payments owed to government contractors. Following this announcement, pressure on the exchange rate eased and inflation dropped, but remained on two digits levels. The IMF stand-by programme was then restarted.

== Aftermath ==
In February 1991, a new run against the Argentine currency took place, triggering a big devaluation and fueling the comeback of inflation. Minister Erman González resigned and was replaced by Domingo Cavallo. In March 1991, the Convertibility plan started, pegging the Austral (and then the Argentine Peso) to the US Dollar. Public debt was refinanced with the Brady Plan.

As the Argentine economy grew, the BONEX bonds price gradually recovered.

== See also ==
- Austral plan
- Rodrigazo
