= List of Latin American economic crises =

There are Latin American economic crises:

- Latin American debt crisis of the 1970s and 1980s
- La Década Perdida - the Lost Decade for Mexico
- Economic history of Mexico § 1982 crisis and recovery
- Great Depression in Latin America - the effects of the Great Depression of the 1930s on Latin America
- Venezuelan banking crisis of 1994
- 2007–10 recession in South America
- Argentine economic crisis (1999–2002)
- Crisis in Venezuela
