= Latin American debt crisis =

Financial crisis during the 1970s and 1980s

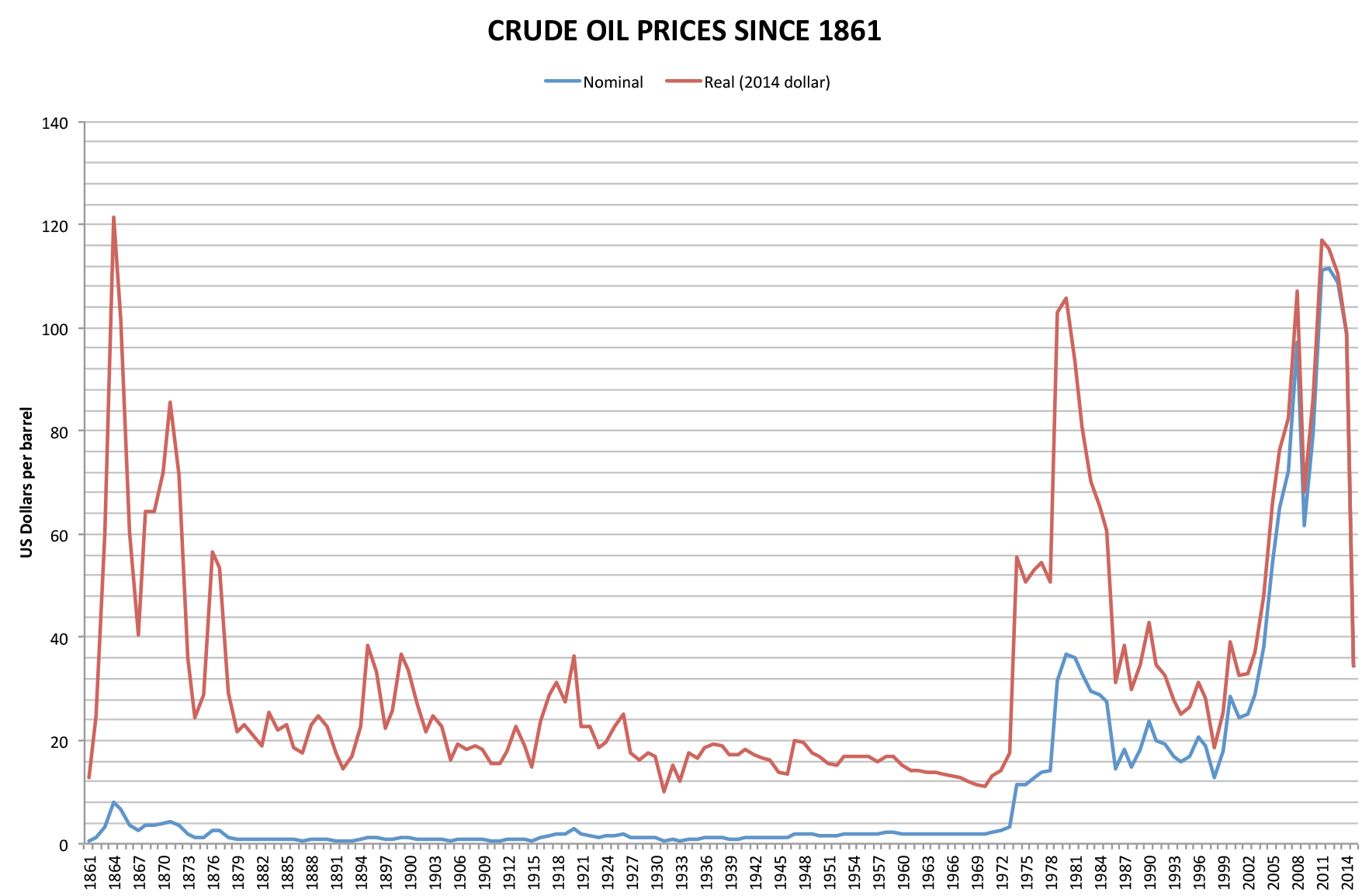
Mexico Crude oil prices from 1861 to 2011

The Latin American debt crisis (Spanish: Crisis de la deuda latinoamericana; Portuguese: Crise da dívida latino-americana) was a financial crisis that originated in the early 1980s (and for some countries starting in the 1970s), often known as La Década Perdida (The Lost Decade), when Latin American countries reached a point where their foreign debt exceeded their earning power and they could not repay it. The IMF's response to the crisis has been criticized for prolonging unsustainable borrowing and transferring private banking losses onto taxpayers, which deepened the region’s debt overhang and delayed necessary market corrections.

== Origins ==
In the 1960s and 1970s, many Latin American countries, notably Brazil, Argentina, and Mexico, borrowed huge sums of money from international creditors for industrialization, especially infrastructure programs. These countries had soaring economies at the time, so the creditors were happy to provide loans. Initially, developing countries typically garnered loans through public routes like the World Bank. After 1973, private banks had an influx of funds from oil-rich countries which believed that sovereign debt was a safe investment. The International Monetary Fund (IMF) supported this wave of borrowing as part of broader development policy goals, but critics argue the Fund underestimated the risks of excessive external debt accumulation, particularly in economies heavily reliant on commodity exports. As Latin American governments took on more debt in the form of short-term loans without enforcing proper safeguards, the region became increasingly exposed to currency volatility and external shocks. In particular, Mexico borrowed against future oil revenues with loans denominated in U.S. dollars, meaning that when the price of oil collapsed, Mexico's ability to pay back its loans deteriorated rapidly, which triggered a wider crisis.

Between 1975 and 1982, Latin American debt to commercial banks increased at a cumulative annual rate of 20.4 percent. This heightened borrowing led Latin American countries to quadruple their external debt from US$75 billion in 1975 to more than $315 billion in 1983, or 50 percent of the region's gross domestic product (GDP). Debt service (interest payments and the repayment of principal) grew even faster as global interest rates surged, reaching $66 billion in 1982, up from $12 billion in 1975. Critics contend that IMF lending practices contributed to this acceleration by encouraging short-term borrowing without enforcing adequate safeguards or accountability for how funds were deployed.

== History ==
When the world economy went into recession in the 1970s and 1980s, and oil prices skyrocketed, it created a breaking point for most countries in the region. Developing countries found themselves in a desperate liquidity crunch. Petroleum-exporting countries, flush with cash after the oil price increases of 1973–1980, invested their money with international banks, which "recycled" a major portion of the capital as syndicated loans to Latin American governments. The sharp increase in oil prices caused many countries to search out more loans to cover the high prices, and even some oil-producing countries took on substantial debt for economic development, hoping that high prices would persist and allow them to repay their debt.

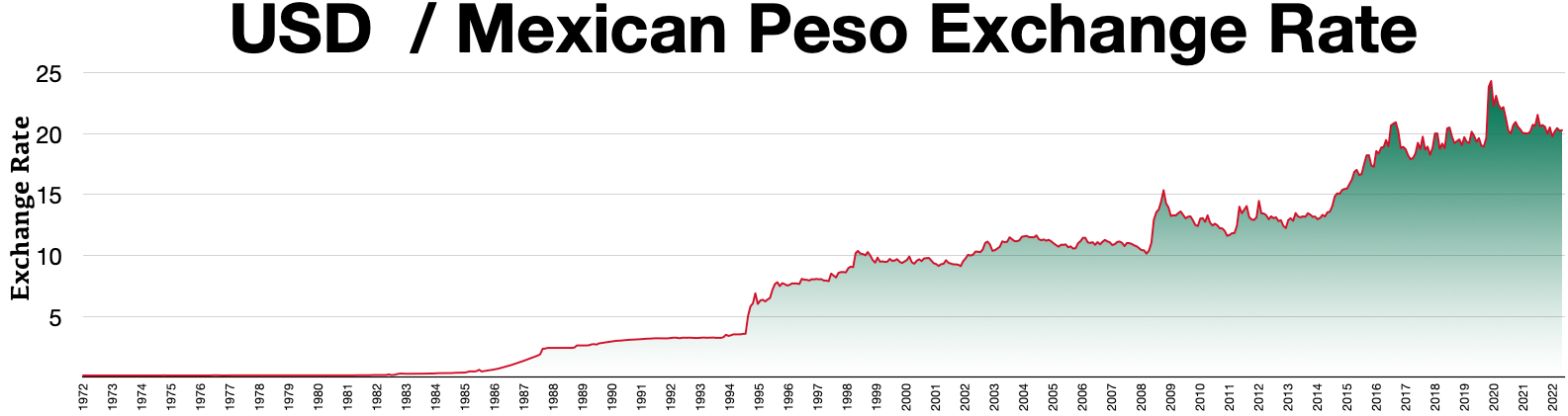
USD / Mexican Peso exchange rate

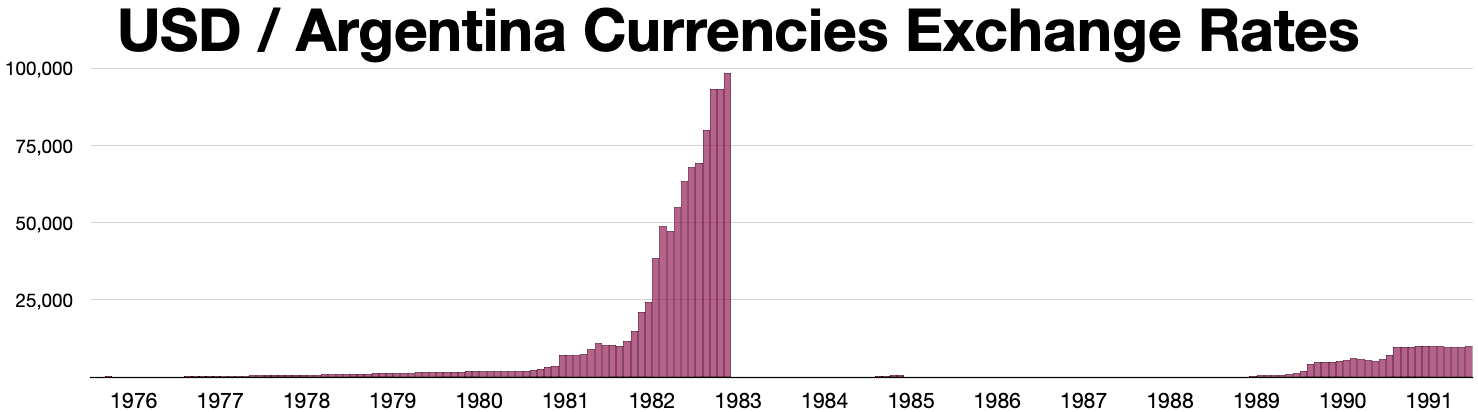
USD / Argentina Currency Exchange Rates *From January 1970 to May 1983: pesos ley 18188 *From June 1983 to May 1985: peso argentino *From June 1985 to December 1991: australes

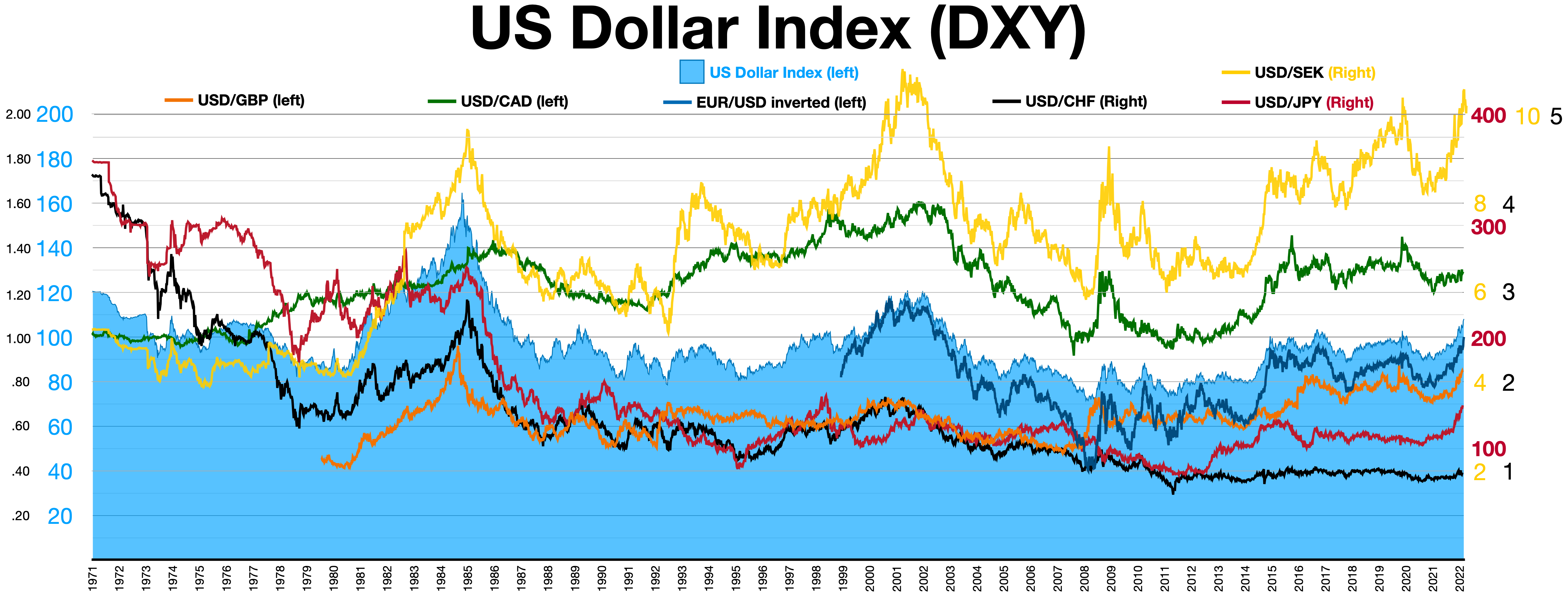
The USD was the strongest it has ever been in 1985 making foreign debt more expensive to pay back, triggering the Plaza Accord US Dollar Index (DXY) USD/GBP exchange rate USD/Canadian dollar exchange rate EUR/USD (inverted) exchange rate USD/JPY exchange rate USD/SEK exchange rate USD/CHF exchange rate

As interest rates increased in the United States of America and in Europe in 1979, debt payments also increased, making it harder for borrowing countries to pay back their debts. Deterioration in the exchange rate with the US dollar meant that Latin American governments ended up owing tremendous quantities of their national currencies, as well as losing purchasing power. The contraction of world trade in 1981 caused the prices of primary resources (Latin America's largest export) to fall.

While the dangerous accumulation of foreign debt occurred over a number of years, the debt crisis began when the international capital markets became aware that Latin America would not be able to repay its loans. This occurred in August 1982 when Mexico's Finance Minister, Jesús Silva-Herzog, declared that Mexico would no longer be able to service its debt. Mexico stated that it could not meet its payment due dates, and announced unilaterally a moratorium of 90 days; it also requested a renegotiation of payment periods and new loans in order to fulfill its prior obligations.

In the wake of Mexico's sovereign default, most commercial banks reduced significantly or halted new lending to Latin America. As much of Latin America's loans were short-term, a crisis ensued when their refinancing was refused. Billions of dollars of loans, which previously would have been refinanced, were now due immediately.

The banks had to somehow restructure the debts to avoid financial panic; this usually involved new loans with very strict conditions, as well as the requirement that the debtor countries accept the intervention of the International Monetary Fund (IMF). There were several stages of strategies to slow and end the crisis. The IMF moved to restructure the payments and reduce government spending in debtor countries. Later it and the World Bank encouraged open markets. Finally, the US and the IMF pushed for debt relief, recognizing that countries could not fully repay the large sums they owed.

== Effects ==
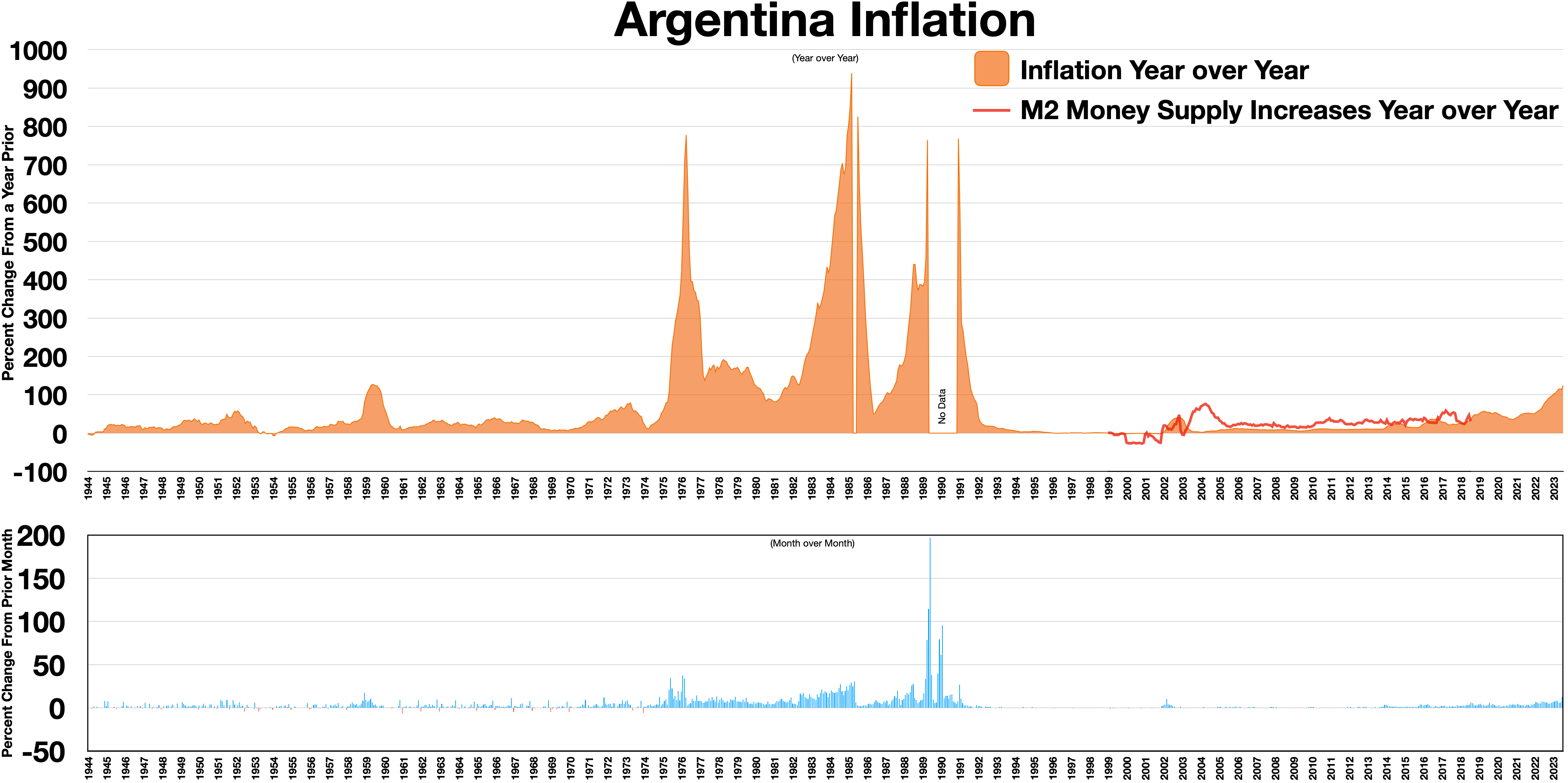
Argentina Inflation Year over Year inflation M2 money supply increases Year over Year Month over Month inflation

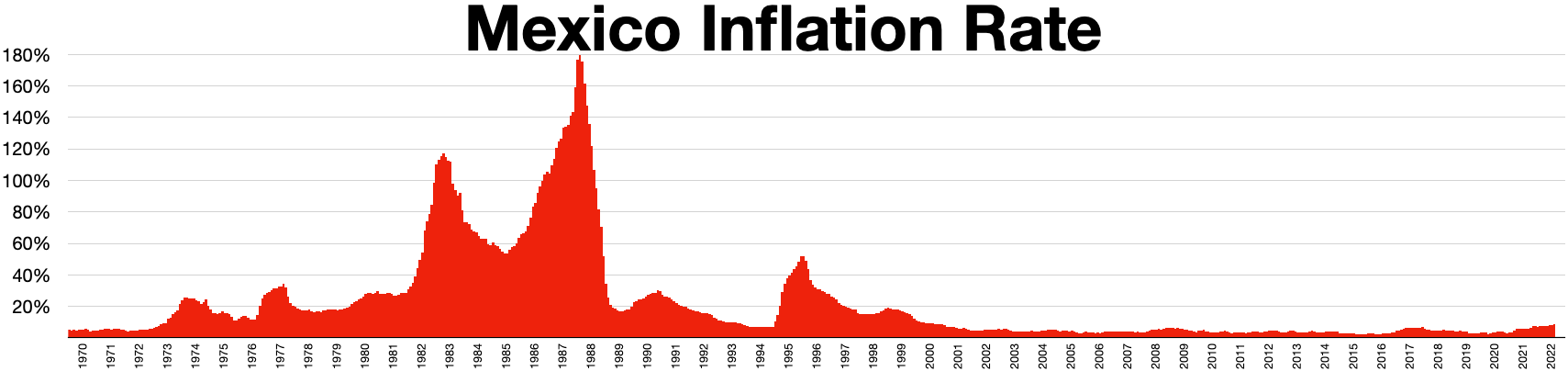
Mexico inflation rate 1970-2022

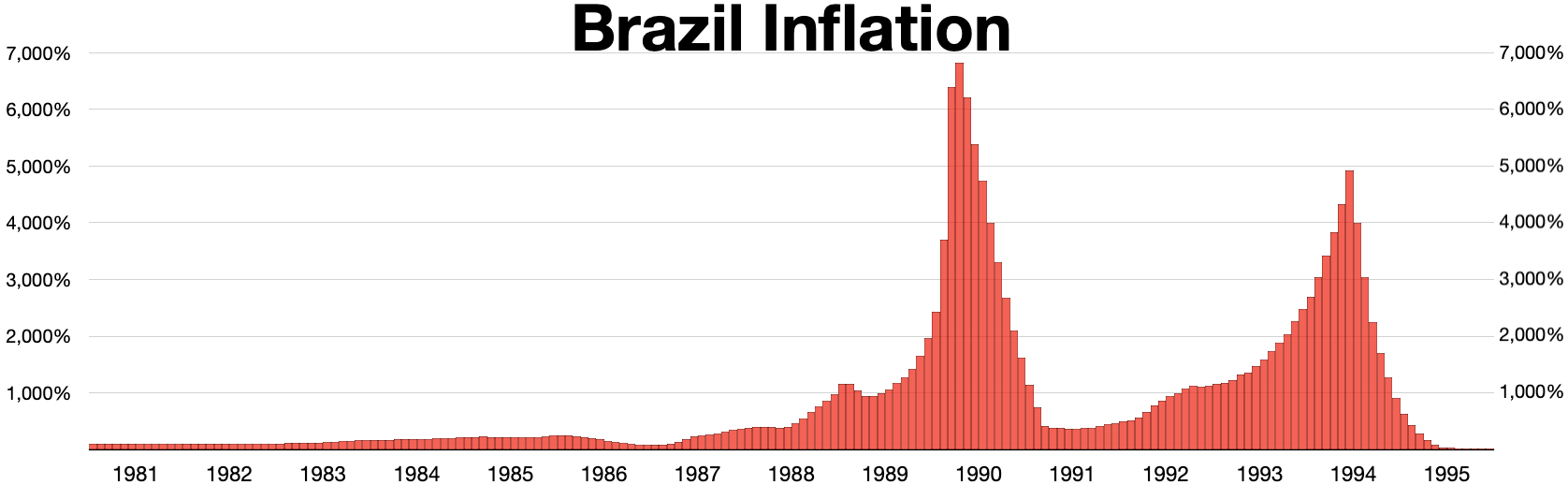
Brazil Inflation 1981-1995

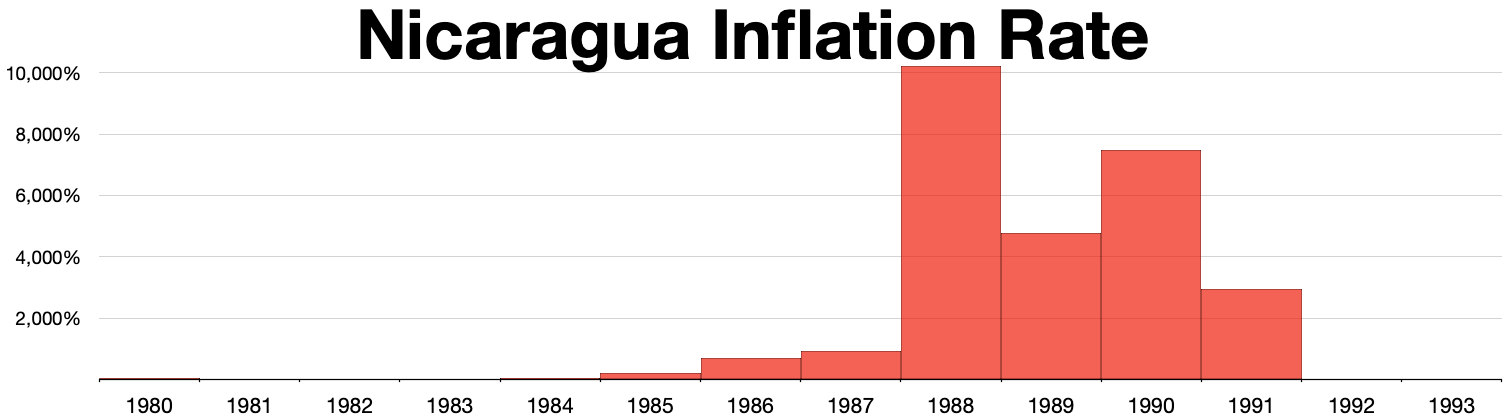
Nicaragua inflation rate 1980-1993

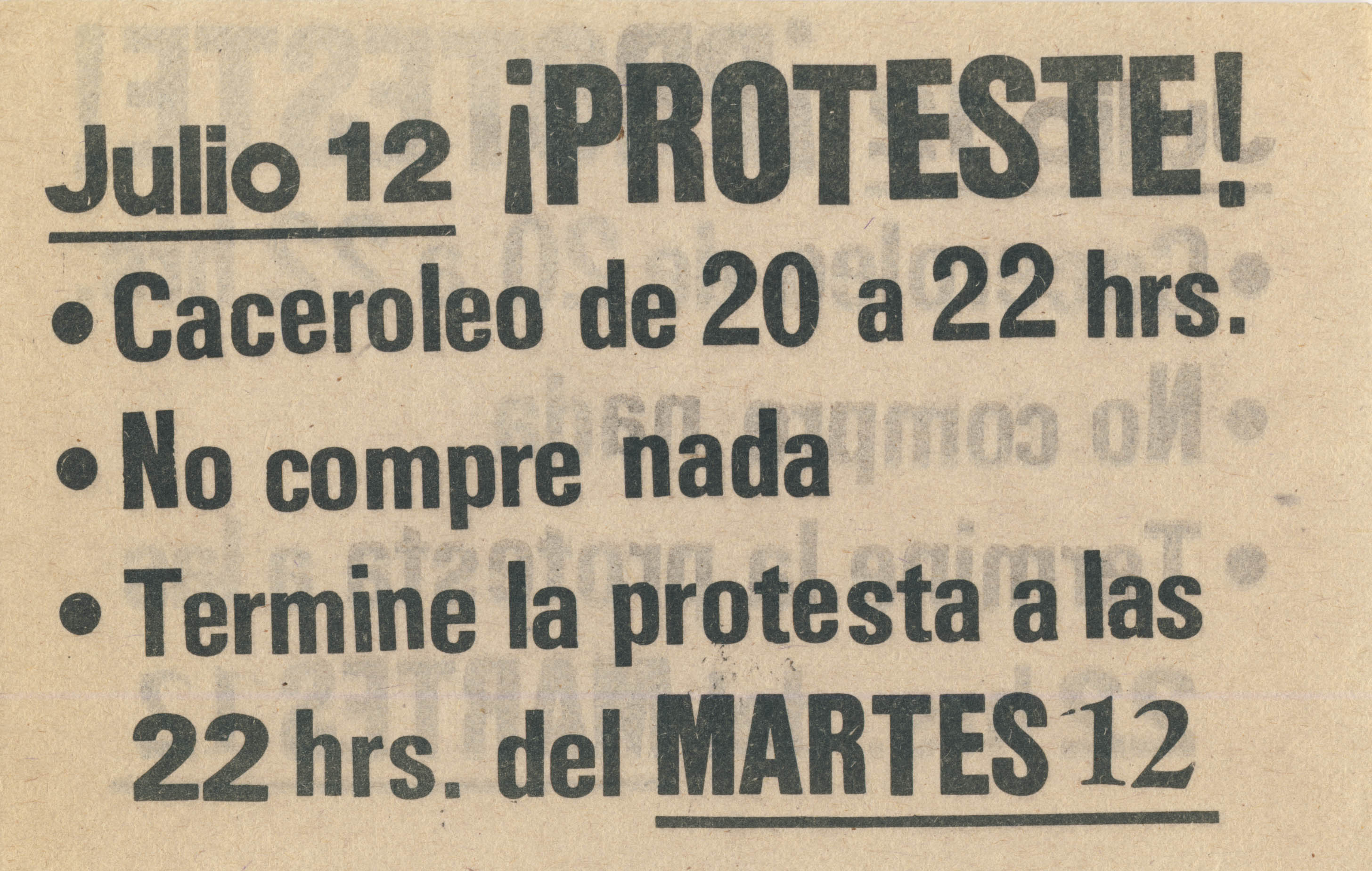
Chilean pamphlet calling for protest including a cacerolazo in 1983

The debt crisis of 1982 was the most serious of Latin America's history. Incomes and imports dropped; economic growth stagnated; unemployment rose to high levels; and inflation reduced the buying power of the middle classes. In fact, in the ten years after 1980, real wages in urban areas actually dropped between 20 and 40 percent. Additionally, investment that might have been used to address social issues and poverty was instead being used to pay the debt. Losses to bankers in the United States were catastrophic, perhaps more than the banking industry's entire collective profits since the nation's founding in the late 1700s.

In response to the crisis, most nations abandoned their import substitution industrialization (ISI) models of economy and adopted an export-oriented industrialization strategy, usually the neoliberal strategy encouraged by the IMF, although there were exceptions such as Chile and Costa Rica, which adopted reformist strategies. A massive process of capital outflow, particularly to the United States, served to depreciate the exchange rates, thereby raising the real interest rate. Real GDP growth rate for the region was only 2.3 percent between 1980 and 1985, but in per capita terms Latin America experienced negative growth of almost 9 percent. Between 1982 and 1985, Latin America paid back US$108 billion.

Before the debt crisis, the creditor countries of the Paris Club were unwilling to provide debt reduction or forgiveness, and would only consider rescheduling, refinancing, or restructuring debt. As a result of the Latin American debt crisis, the Paris Club began to gradually re-evaluate its unwillingness to provide debt forgiveness or reduction over the course of the 1980s. By the late 1980s, the Paris Club concluded that it was not possible to avoid a vicious cycle of debt without a willingness on the Paris Club's part to write-off non-performing loans. It provided its first partial debt reduction in 1988.

== International Monetary Fund ==
Before the crisis, Latin American countries such as Brazil and Mexico borrowed money to enhance economic stability and reduce the poverty rate. However, as their inability to pay back their foreign debts became apparent, loans ceased, stopping the flow of resources previously available for the innovations and improvements of the previous few years. This rendered several half-finished projects useless, contributing to infrastructure problems in the affected countries.

During the international recession of the 1970s, many major countries attempted to slow down and stop inflation in their countries by raising the interest rates of the money that they loaned, causing Latin America's already enormous debt to increase further. Between the years of 1970 to 1980, Latin America's debt levels increased by more than one thousand percent.

The crisis caused per capita income to drop and also increased poverty as the gap between the wealthy and poor increased dramatically. Due to plummeting employment rates, children and young adults were forced into the drug trade, prostitution and terrorism. Low employment also worsened many problems like crime and generally reduced quality of life in the affected countries. Frantically trying to solve these problems, debtor countries felt constant pressure to repay their debts, increasing the difficulty of rebuilding ruined economies.

Latin American countries, unable to pay their debts, turned to the IMF (International Monetary Fund), which provided money for loans and unpaid debts. In return, the IMF forced Latin America to make reforms that would favor free-market capitalism, further aggravating inequalities and poverty conditions. The IMF also forced Latin America to implement austerity plans and programs that lowered total spending in an effort to recover from the debt crisis. This reduction in government spending further deteriorated social fractures in the economy and halted industrialisation efforts.

Latin America's growth rate and living standards fell dramatically due to government austerity plans that restricted further spending, creating popular rage towards the IMF, a symbol of "outsider" power over Latin America. Government leaders and officials were ridiculed and some even discharged due to involvement and defending of the IMF. In the late 1980s, Brazilian officials planned a debt negotiation meeting where they decided to "never again sign agreements with the IMF". The result of IMF intervention caused greater financial deepening (Financialization) and dependence on the developed world capital flows, as well as increased exposure to international volatility. The application of structural adjustment programs entailed high social costs in terms of rising unemployment and underemployment, falling real wages and incomes, and increased poverty.

== 2015 levels of external debt ==
The following is a list of external debt for Latin America based on a 2015 report by The World Factbook.

Rank	Country – Entity	External Debt (million US$)	Date of information
24	Brazil	535,400	31 Dec 2014 est.
26	Mexico	438,400	31 Dec 2014 est
42	Chile	140,000	31 Dec 2014 est.
45	Argentina	115,700	31 Dec 2014 est.
51	Colombia	84,000	31 Dec 2014 est.
52	Venezuela	69,660	31 Dec 2014 est.
60	Peru	56,470	31 Dec 2014 est.
79	Cuba	25,230	31 Dec 2014 est.
83	Ecuador	21,740	31 Dec 2014 est.
84	Dominican Republic	19,720	31 Dec 2014 est.
86	Costa Rica	18,370	31 Dec 2014 est.
88	Uruguay	17,540	31 Dec 2014 est.
93	Guatemala	15,940	31 Dec 2014 est.
94	Panama	15,470	31 Dec 2014 est.
95	El Salvador	15,460	31 Dec 2014 est.
103	Nicaragua	10,250	31 Dec 2014 est.
106	Paraguay	8,759	31 Dec 2014 est.
108	Bolivia	8,073	31 Dec 2014 est.
117	Honduras	7,111	31 Dec 2014 est.

== See also ==
- 1998–2002 Argentine great depression
- 1982–1985 Bolivian economic crisis
- Chilean crisis of 1982
- Currency crisis
- Economic history of Latin America
- Latin American economy
- List of Latin American economic crises
- List of sovereign debt crises
- Mexican peso crisis
- Odious debt
- South American economic crisis of 2002
