= Argentine peso ley =

Currency of Argentina between 1970 and 1983

peso ley argentino (Spanish)
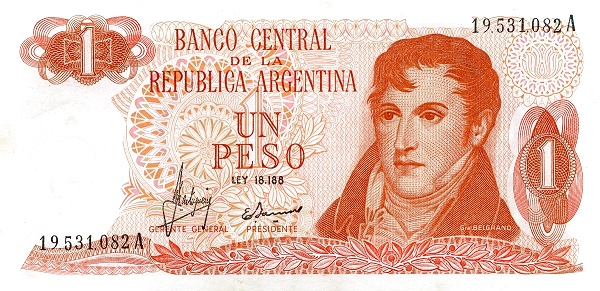

ISO 4217
- Code: ARY (ARL informally)

Unit
- Symbol: $L

Denominations
- Subunit
- 1/100: centavo
- Symbol
- centavo: ¢
- Banknotes: 1, 5, 10, 50, 100, 500, 1000, 5000, 10 000, 50 000, 100 000, 500 000, 1 000 000 pesos
- Coins: 1, 5, 10, 20, 50 centavos, 1, 5, 10, 50, 100 pesos

Demographics
- Date of introduction: January 1, 1970
- Replaced: Argentine peso moneda nacional
- Date of withdrawal: May 5, 1983
- Replaced by: Argentine peso
- User(s): Argentina

Issuance
- Central bank: Banco Central de la República Argentina
- Website: www.bcra.gov.ar
- This infobox shows the latest status before this currency was rendered obsolete.

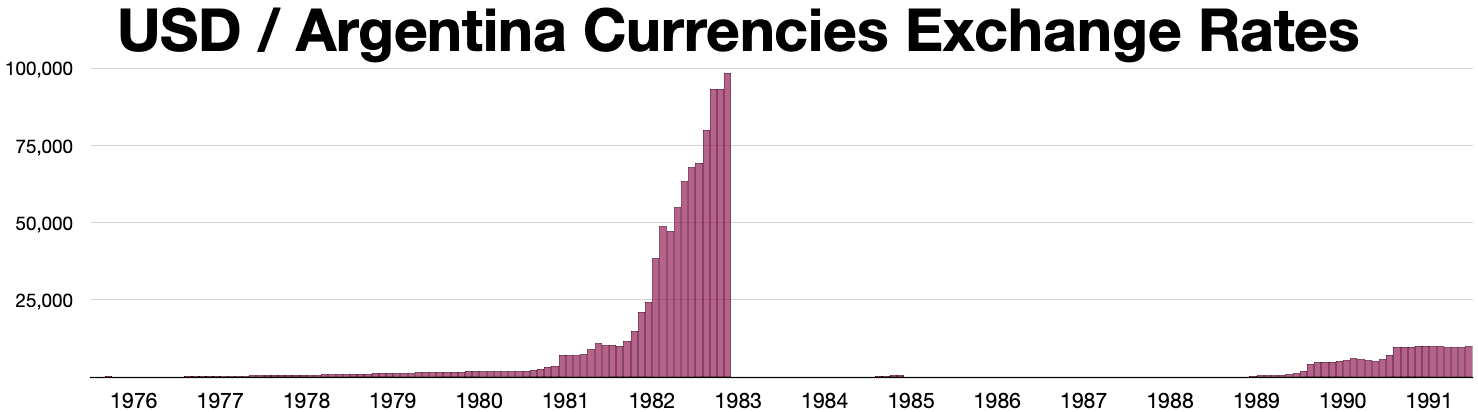
USD / Argentina Currency Exchange Rates *From January 1970 to May 1983: pesos ley 18188 *From June 1983 to May 1985: peso argentino *From June 1985 to December 1991: australes

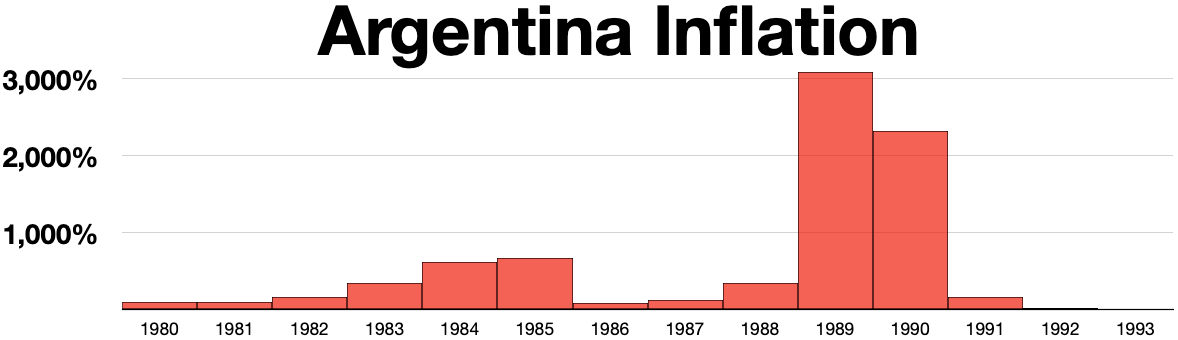
Argentina inflation 1980-1993

The peso ley 18.188 (ARY; unofficially ARL; peso ley dieciocho mil ciento ochenta y ocho), usually known as either peso or, to distinguish it from the earlier peso moneda nacional, informally as peso ley, was the currency of Argentina between January 1, 1970, and May 5, 1983. It was subdivided into 100 centavos. Its symbol was $L, sometimes $. Its name comes from law 18188 which established it, effective April 5, 1969.

== History ==
The peso ley replaced the peso moneda nacional at a rate of 100 to 1. It was itself replaced by the peso argentino at a rate of 10,000 to 1. It was later replaced by the Argentine peso on May 5th 1983.

== Coins ==
In 1970 coins were introduced in denominations of 1, 5, 10, 20 and 50 centavos. As inflation eroded the currency's value, higher denominations were introduced: 1 peso in 1974, 5 and 10 pesos in 1976, and 50 and 100 pesos in 1978.

=== Centavo ===
Value	Obverse	Emission start date	Withdrawn	Composition	Diameter
1	Liberty	1 Jan 1970	31 Oct 1979	Aluminium	16mm
5	Liberty	18 May 1970	31 Oct 1979	Aluminium	18mm
10	Liberty	1 Jan 1970	31 Oct 1979	Brass	17mm
20	Liberty	18 May 1970	31 Oct 1979	Brass	19mm
50	Liberty	1 Jan 1970	31 Oct 1979	Brass	21mm

=== Peso ===
Value	Obverse	Emission start date	Withdrawn	Composition	Diameter
1	Sun	1 Oct 1974	2 Jan 1984	Aluminium-Brass	23mm
5	Sun	12 Apr 1976	2 Jan 1984	Aluminium-Brass	24mm
5	Guillermo Brown	1977	2 Jan 1984	Aluminium-Brass	24mm
10	Sun	12 Jul 1976	2 Jan 1984	Aluminium-Brass	26mm
10	Guillermo Brown	1977	2 Jan 1984	Aluminium-Brass	26mm
50	José de San Martín Bicentennial	1 Aug 1978	2 Jan 1984	Aluminium-Brass	27mm
50	Conquest of the Desert centennial	1979	2 Jan 1984	Aluminium-Brass	27mm
50	José de San Martín	1979	2 Jan 1984	Aluminium-Brass	27mm
50	José de San Martín	1980	2 Jan 1984	Brass-Clad Steel	27mm
100	José de San Martín Bicentennial	1 Aug 1978	2 Jan 1984	Aluminium-Bronze	28mm
100	Conquest of the Desert centennial	1979	2 Jan 1984	Aluminium-Bronze	28mm
100	José de San Martín	1979	2 Jan 1984	Aluminium-Bronze	28mm
100	José de San Martín	1980	2 Jan 1984	Brass-Clad Steel	28mm

== Banknotes ==
Banknotes were issued in the following denominations:

Obverse	Reverse	Value	Portrait	Back	Emission start date	Withdrawn
		1	Manuel Belgrano	Nahuel Huapi Lake	30 Jan 1970	1 Apr 1981
		5	Manuel Belgrano	National Flag Memorial in Rosario	24 Nov 1971	1 Apr 1981
		10	Manuel Belgrano	Iguazu Falls	1 Sep 1970	1 Apr 1981
		50	José de San Martín	Termas de Reyes (Jujuy)	15 Mar 1972	1 Apr 1981
		100	José de San Martín	Ushuaia	15 Feb 1971	1 Apr 1981
		500	José de San Martín	Cerro de la Gloria (Mendoza)	30 Nov 1972	2 Apr 1984
		1000	José de San Martín	Plaza de Mayo (Buenos Aires)	27 Nov 1973	2 Apr 1984
		5000	José de San Martín	Mar del Plata	12 Dec 1977	2 Apr 1984
		10,000	José de San Martín	El Palmar National Park (Entre Ríos)	25 Oct 1976	19 Jul 1985
		50,000	José de San Martín	Argentine Central Bank	19 Feb 1979	19 Jul 1985
		100,000	José de San Martín	National Mint House	1 Nov 1979	19 Jul 1985
		500,000	José de San Martín	Buenos Aires foundation	28 Jul 1980	19 Jul 1985
		1,000,000	José de San Martín	May Revolution	25 Nov 1981	19 Jul 1985

== See also ==
- La Década Perdida (The Lost Decade)
- Latin American debt crisis
