= Eugène André Oudiné =

French sculptor and engraver (1810–1887)

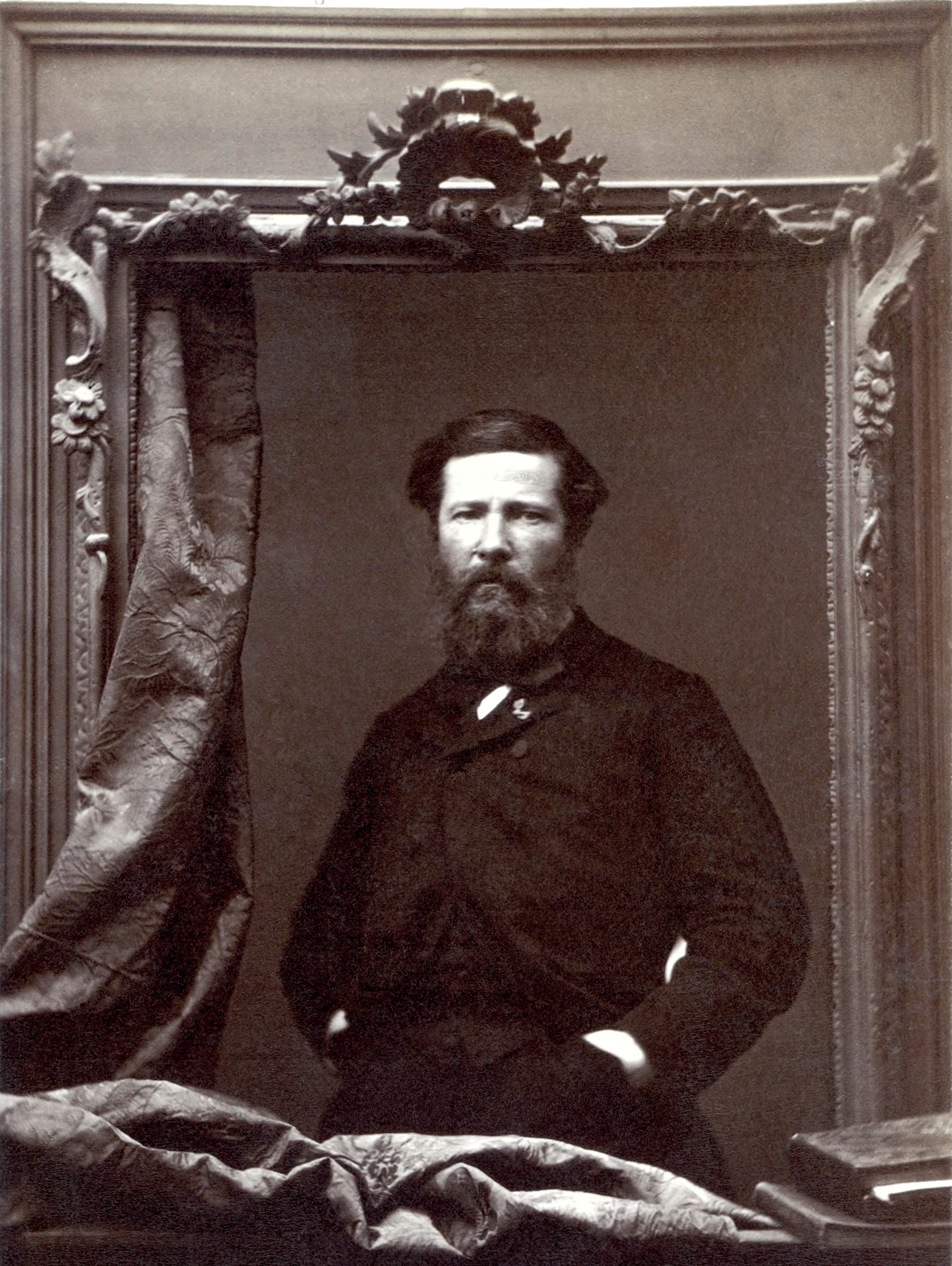
Eugène André Oudiné, photograph by Nadar

Eugène André Oudiné (1 January 1810, Paris – 12 April 1887, Paris) was a French sculptor and engraver of medals and coins, and devoted himself from the beginning to the medallist's branch of sculpture, although he also excelled in monumental sculpture and portrait busts.

== Life ==
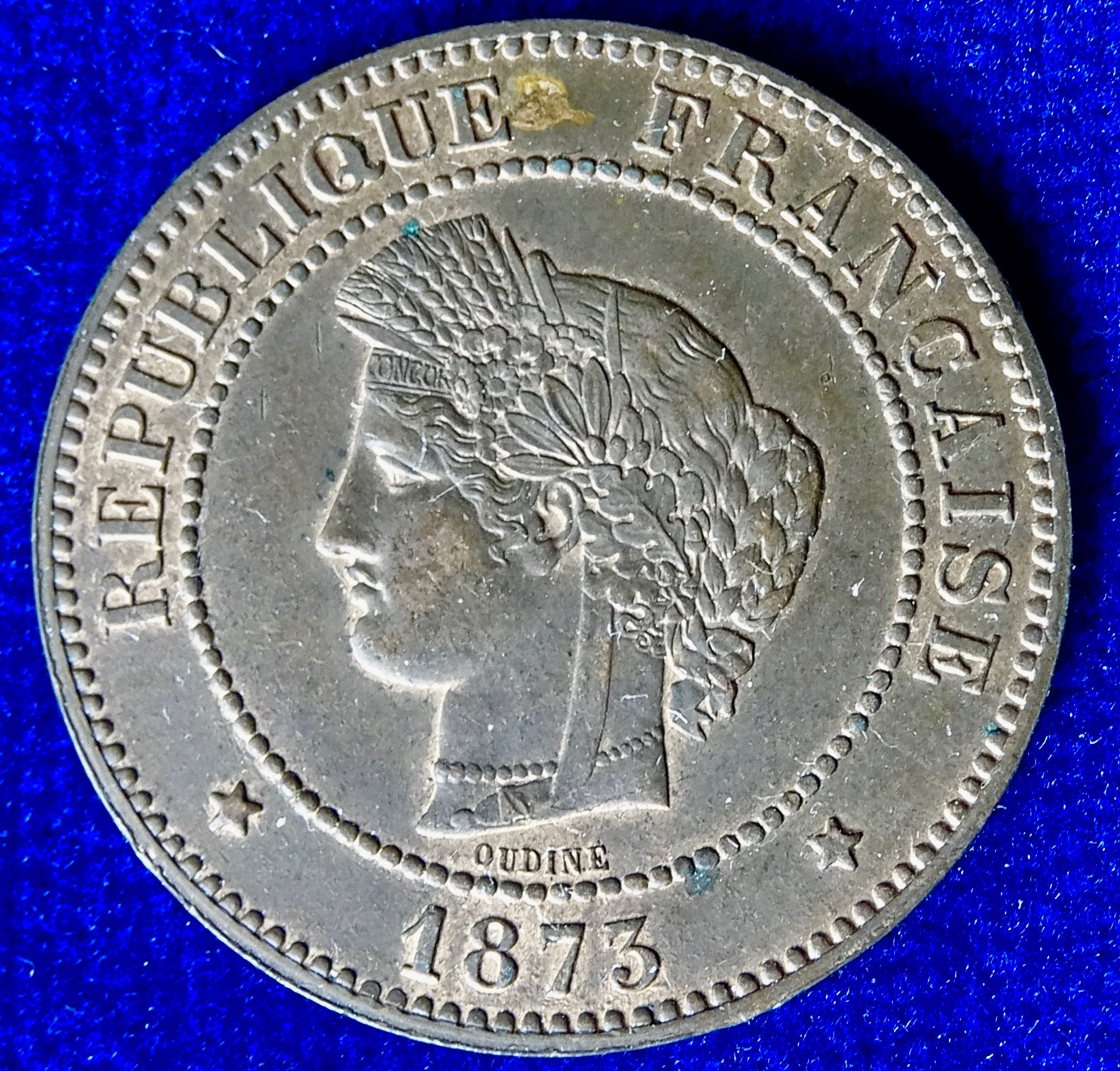
Coin with Ceres

Having taken the Prix de Rome for engraving in 1831, he had a sensational success with his Wounded Gladiator, which he exhibited in the same year. He subsequently occupied official posts as designer, first to the Inland Revenue Office, and then to the Mint. Among his most famous medals are that struck in commemoration of the annexation of Savoy by France, and that on the occasion of the peace of Villafranca.

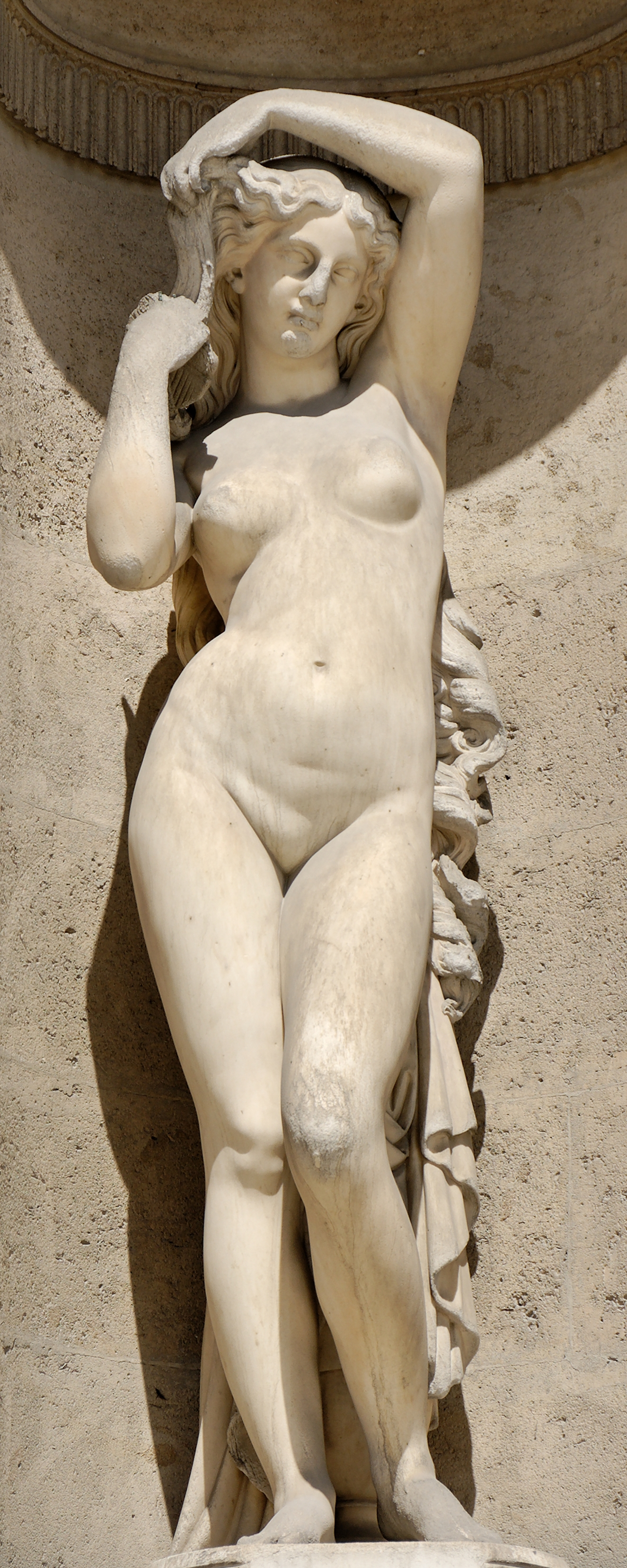
Bathsheba (1859), North Façade of the Cour Carree of the Louvre Palace, Paris

Other remarkable pieces are The Apotheosis of Napoleon I, The Amnesty, Le Duc d'Orleans, Bertholet, The Universal Exposition, The Second of December, 1851, The Establishment of the Republic, The Battle of Inkermann, and Napoleon's Tomb at the Invalides. For the Hôtel de Ville, Paris he executed fourteen bas-reliefs, which were destroyed in 1871.

Of his monumental works, many are to be seen in public places in and near Paris. In the Tuileries gardens is his group of Daphnis and Hebe; in the Jardin du Luxembourg the Queen Bertha; at the Louvre the Buffon; and in the courtyard of the same palace the Bathsheba. A monument to General Espagne is at the Invalides, and a King Louis VIII at Versailles.

Oudine, who may be considered the father of the modern medal, died in Paris on 12 April 1887.
