= Market run =

Purchasing spree caused by an anticipated shortage

A market run or run on the market occurs when consumers increase purchasing of a particular product because they fear a shortage. As a market run progresses, it generates its own momentum: as more people demand the item, the supply line becomes unable to keep up. This causes a local shortage, which in turn encourages further hoarding.

Examples include a run on the gasoline market following hurricane Katrina in 2005, an ammunition shortage following President Obama's election in 2008, and a run on toilet paper following a Johnny Carson joke on The Tonight Show in 1973.

== Relationship to panic buying ==
The phenomenon described as a market run is closely related to the well-studied economic behaviour known as panic buying, in which consumers purchase unusually large quantities of goods in anticipation of a shortage or crisis. In economics, panic buying refers to a rapid surge in demand driven by fear of future scarcity, often exacerbated by social influence and media reporting, which can itself create or worsen shortages.

Academic analyses describe panic buying as a response to anticipated supply disruptions, where consumers attempt to acquire essential goods before they become unavailable, leading to temporary shortages and stockouts even in well-supplied markets. Such behaviour has been observed across diverse contexts including health emergencies, natural disasters, and supply chain disruptions, and can generate self-fulfilling shortages when consumer actions outpace supply capacity.

== See also ==
- Bank run
- Panic buying
