= Argentine peso (1983–1985) =

Former currency of Argentina

peso argentino (Spanish)

ISO 4217
- Code: ARP

Unit
- Symbol: $a

Denominations
- Subunit
- 1/100: centavo
- Symbol
- centavo: ¢
- Banknotes: 1, 5, 10, 50, 100, 500, 1000, 5000, 10 000 pesos
- Coins: 1, 5, 10, 50 centavos, 1, 5, 10, 50 pesos

Demographics
- Date of introduction: 1 June 1983
- Replaced: Argentine peso ley
- Date of withdrawal: 14 June 1985
- Replaced by: Austral
- User(s): Argentina

Issuance
- Central bank: Banco Central de la República Argentina
- Website: www.bcra.gov.ar
- This infobox shows the latest status before this currency was rendered obsolete.

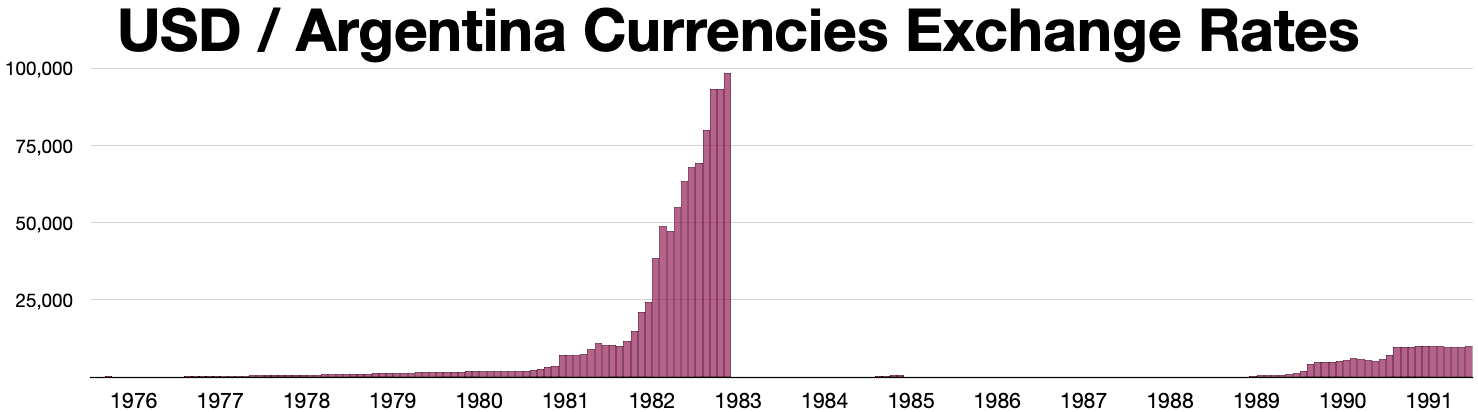
USD / Argentina Currency Exchange Rates *From January 1970 to May 1983: Pesos Ley 18188 *From June 1983 to May 1985: Peso Argentino *From June 1985 to December 1991: Australes

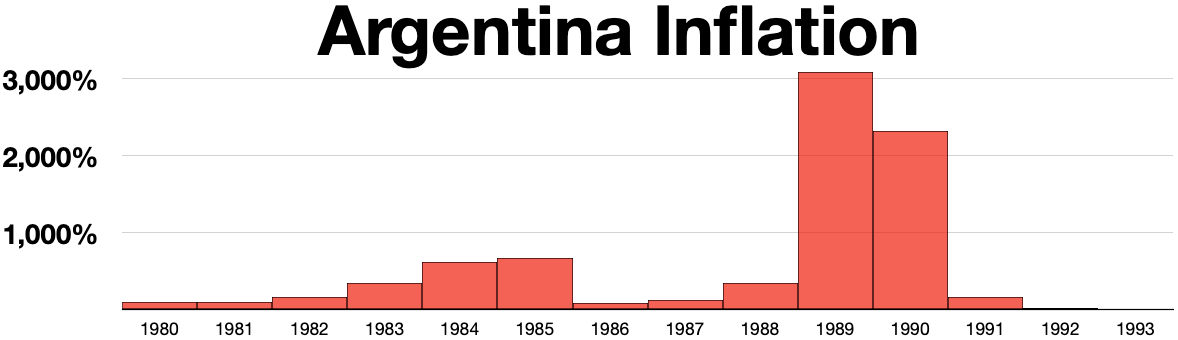
Argentina inflation 1980-1993

The peso argentino was the currency of Argentina between 1 June 1983, and 14 June 1985. It was subdivided into 100 centavos. The symbol was $a. The ISO 4217 code was ARP.

== History ==
The peso argentino replaced the peso ley at a rate of 1 peso argentino = 10,000 pesos ley. It was itself replaced by the austral at a rate of 1 austral = 1000 pesos argentinos.

== Coins ==
In 1983, coins for 1, 5, 10 and 50 centavos were issued. In 1984, the 50 centavo was again issued, alongside 1, 5 and 10 pesos argentinos. In 1985, 5, 10 and 50 peso argentino coins were struck.

=== Centavo ===
Image	Value	Obverse	Emission start date	Withdrawn	Composition	Diameter
	1	Liberty	1 Jun 1983	19 Jul 1985	Aluminium	17 mm
	5	Liberty	1 Jun 1983	19 Jul 1985	Aluminium	18 mm
	10	Liberty	1 Jun 1983	19 Jul 1985	Aluminium	19 mm
	50	Liberty	1 Jun 1983	19 Jul 1985	Aluminium	20 mm

=== Peso argentino ===
Image	Value	Obverse	Emission start date	Withdrawn	Composition	Diameter
	1	National Congress	6 Jul 1984	19 Jul 1985	Aluminium	23 mm
	5	Buenos Aires Cabildo	3 Dec 1984	31 Jul 1991	Brass	20 mm
	10	House of Tucumán	3 Dec 1984	31 Jul 1991	Brass	21 mm
	50	Liberty	31 May 1985	31 Jul 1991	Aluminium-Bronze	22 mm

The 50-peso coins have the text Cincuentenario del Banco Central ("Central Bank fiftieth anniversary").

== Banknotes ==
In June 1983, the Banco Central issued notes for 1, 5, 10, 50 and 100 pesos argentinos, based in modified plates of 1, 5, 10, 50 and 100 peso ley, were demonetized in 1981. These banknotes followed by 1000 pesos argentinos note in October. In 1984, 500 and 5000 peso argentino notes were introduced and old peso ley banknotes below 1 peso argentino were demonetized. In 1985, notes for 10,000 pesos argentinos were introduced.

Image	Value	Portrait	Back	Emission start date	Withdrawn
	1	José de San Martín	Nahuel Huapi Lake	1 Jun 1983	19 Jul 1985
	5	José de San Martín	National Flag Memorial in Rosario	1 Jun 1983	31 May 1987
	10	José de San Martín	Iguazu Falls	1 Jun 1983	31 May 1987
	50	José de San Martín	Termas de Reyes (Jujuy)	1 Jun 1983	31 May 1987
	100	José de San Martín	Ushuaia	1 Jun 1983	31 May 1987
	500	José de San Martín	Meeting before May Revolution	22 May 1984	31 May 1987
	1000	José de San Martín	Crossing of the Andes	31 Oct 1983	30 Nov 1987
	5000	Juan Bautista Alberdi	Constitutional conference of 1853	29 Nov 1984	30 Nov 1987
	10,000	Manuel Belgrano	Creation of the national flag	3 Apr 1985	30 Nov 1987

When the austral was introduced (June 15, 1985), some 1000, 5000 and 10,000 peso argentino notes were overstamped with A 1 (1 austral), A 5 (5 australes) and A 10 (10 australes), respectively, and old peso ley banknotes were demonetized.

== See also ==
- La Década Perdida (The Lost Decade)
- Latin American debt crisis
