= Argentine austral =

Former currency of Argentina

austral argentino (Spanish)
- Argentine 10 austral banknote

ISO 4217
- Code: ARA

Units of account
- Base unit: austral
- Plural: australes
- Symbol: ₳
- Subunit
- 1/100: centavo
- Symbol
- centavo: ¢

Denominations
- Banknotes: ₳1, ₳5, ₳10, ₳50, ₳100, ₳500, ₳1,000, ₳5,000, ₳10,000, ₳50,000, ₳100,000, ₳500,000
- Coins: 1/2¢, 1¢, 5¢, 10¢, 50¢, ₳1, ₳5, ₳10, ₳100, ₳500, ₳1,000

Demographics
- Date of introduction: 15 June 1985
- Replaced: Peso argentino
- Date of withdrawal: 31 December 1991
- Replaced by: Convertible peso
- User(s): Argentina

Issuance
- Central bank: Banco Central de la República Argentina
- Website: www.bcra.gov.ar
- This infobox shows the latest status before this currency was rendered obsolete.

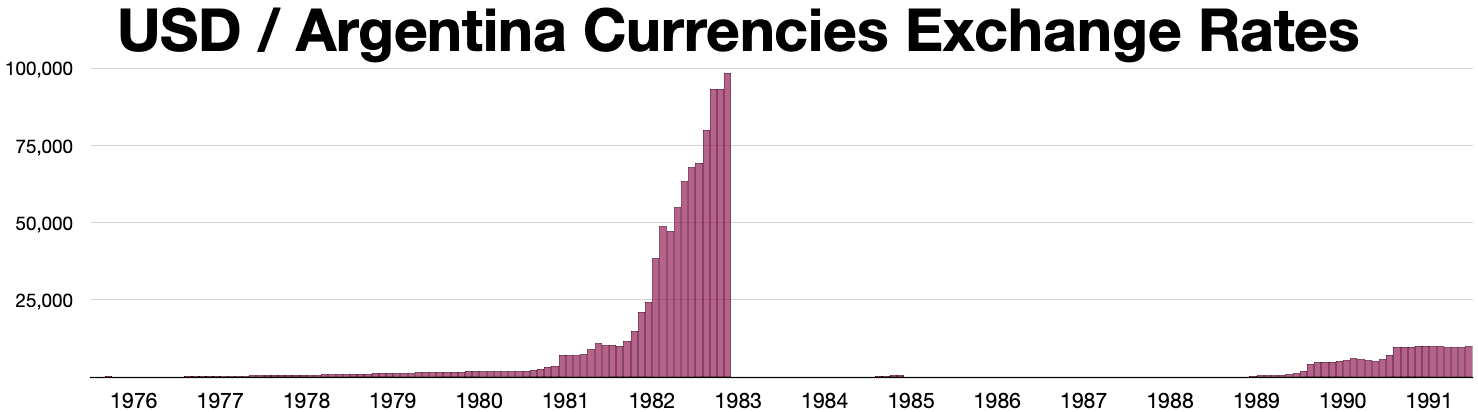
USD / Argentina Currency Exchange Rates *From January 1970 to May 1983: Pesos Ley 18188 *From June 1983 to May 1985: Peso Argentino *From June 1985 to December 1991: Australes

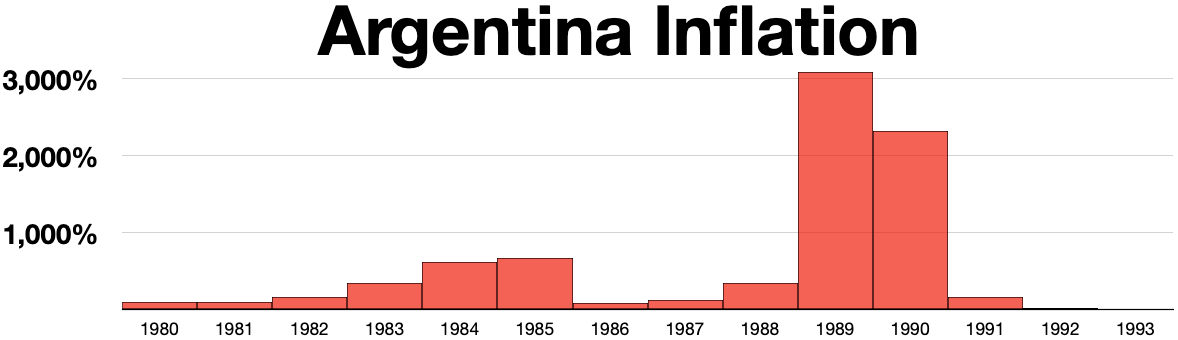
Argentina inflation 1980-1993

The austral was the currency of Argentina between 15 June 1985, and 31 December 1991. It was divided into 100 centavos. The symbol was an uppercase A with an extra horizontal line, (₳). This symbol appeared on all coins issued in this currency (including centavos), to distinguish them from earlier currencies.

The symbol for the austral is encoded in Unicode (as of 4.1), as U+20B3 ₳ AUSTRAL SIGN.

== History ==
Finance Minister Juan Vital Sourrouille devised the Austral plan. The austral replaced the peso argentino at a rate of ₳1 = $a1,000, making the austral worth US$1.25, or 80 centavos de austral per U.S. dollar.

In 1992, the austral was itself replaced by the convertible peso at a rate of $1 = ₳10,000.

== Coins ==
In 1985, coins were introduced for 1/2, 1, 5, 10 and 50 centavos. The 1/2¢ was only issued in 1985, whilst production of the 1¢ ceased in 1987, 5¢ ceased in 1988, and that of the other centavo coins ended in 1989. In 1989, ₳1, ₳5 and ₳10 coins were issued, followed in 1990 and 1991 by ₳100, ₳500 and ₳1,000 denominations.

=== Centavo ===
Averse	Obverse	Value	Obverse	Entered circulation	Withdrawn	Composition	Diameter
		1/2¢	Hornero	23 Sep 1985	31 Dec 1991	Copper-Aluminium (92/8)	19 mm
		1¢	Rhea	23 Sep 1985	31 Dec 1991	Copper-Aluminium (92/8)	20 mm
		5¢	Puma	23 Sep 1985	31 Dec 1991	Copper-Aluminium (92/8)	23 mm
		10¢	Coat of arms	14 Oct 1985	31 Dec 1991	Copper-Aluminium (92/8)	21 mm
		50¢	Liberty	14 Oct 1985	31 Dec 1991	Copper-Aluminium (92/8)	23 mm

=== Austral ===
Averse	Obverse	Value	Obverse	Entered circulation	Withdrawn	Composition	Diameter
		₳1	Buenos Aires Cabildo	27 Mar 1989	31 Dec 1991	Aluminium	20 mm
		₳5	House of Tucumán	22 May 1989	31 Dec 1991	Aluminium	22 mm
		₳10	Casa del Acuerdo	26 Jun 1989	31 Dec 1991	Aluminium	22 mm
		₳100	Coat of arms	28 Nov 1990	31 Oct 1993	Aluminium	21 mm
		₳500	Coat of arms	1 Nov 1990	31 Oct 1993	Aluminium	23 mm
		₳1,000	Coat of arms	28 Nov 1990	31 Oct 1993	Aluminium	24 mm

== Banknotes ==
In 1985, provisional issues were made consisting of $a1000, $a5000 and $a10,000 notes overstamped with the values ₳1, ₳5 and ₳10.

Value	Comments	Portrait	Entered circulation	Withdrawn	Image
₳1	Provisional	José de San Martín	31 Oct 1985	30 Nov 1987	
₳5	Provisional	Juan Bautista Alberdi	31 Oct 1985	30 Nov 1987	
₳10	Provisional	Manuel Belgrano	31 Oct 1985	30 Nov 1987	

Between 1985 and 1991, the following notes were issued by the Banco Central:

Value	Comments	Portrait	Entered circulation	Withdrawn	Image	value in 1992 convertible peso
₳1	Definitive	Bernardino Rivadavia	31 Oct 1985	31 Oct 1991		
₳5	Definitive	Justo José de Urquiza	28 Feb 1986	31 Oct 1991		
₳10	Definitive	Santiago Derqui	30 Dec 1985	31 Oct 1991		
₳50	Definitive	Bartolomé Mitre	23 Jun 1986	31 Dec 1991		
₳100	Definitive	Domingo F. Sarmiento	25 Nov 1985	1 Jun 1992		Arg$0.01
₳500	Definitive	Nicolás Avellaneda	2 May 1988	1 Jun 1992		Arg$0.05
₳1,000	Definitive	Julio A. Roca	30 Sep 1988	1 Jun 1992		Arg$0.10
₳5,000	Definitive	Juárez Celman	26 May 1989	1 Oct 1992		Arg$0.50
₳10,000	Provisional	José de San Martín	31 Jul 1989	31 Aug 1991		Arg$1
₳10,000	Definitive	Carlos Pellegrini	25 Aug 1989	1 Oct 1992		Arg$1
₳50,000	Provisional	José de San Martín	2 Jun 1989	31 Aug 1991		Arg$5
₳50,000	Definitive	Luis Sáenz Peña	8 Nov 1989	2 Jan 1993		Arg$5
₳100,000	Definitive	José E. Uriburu	21 May 1990	2 Jan 1993		Arg$10
₳500,000	Provisional	José de San Martín	2 Jul 1990	31 Oct 1991		Arg$50
₳500,000	Definitive	Manuel Quintana	1 Nov 1990	2 Jan 1993		Arg$50

All banknotes except the provisional types show on the back an image of Liberty with a torch and shield. The provisional banknotes were produced from modified peso ley plates. On the obverses, the word PESOS were erased, whilst the reverse designs substituted the picture with the denomination written in words without spaces in several rows. The denomination was shown on both faces in the form ₳10 MIL (₳10,000), ₳50 MIL (₳50,000) and ₳500 MIL (₳500,000).

== See also ==
- La Década Perdida (The Lost Decade)
- Latin American debt crisis
