= Sol =

Sol or SOL may refer to:

== Astronomy ==
- The Sun
- Mars sol, solar day on Mars
- Solar System

== Currency ==
- SOL Project, a currency project in France
- French sol, or sou
- Argentine sol
- Bolivian sol, the currency of Bolivia from 1827 to 1864
- Peruvian sol, introduced in 1991
- Peruvian sol (1863–1985)
- Solana (blockchain platform) (SOL), a cryptocurrency

== Entertainment, arts and media ==
=== Music ===
- Sol (musical note) or G, a note of the solfege music scale
- Sol (band), a Canadian indie rock band active in the 1990s
- Sol Band or simply Sol, Palestinian folk-pop band
- SOL (album), by electronic musician Eskmo
- Sol, an album by Ougenweide
- Shit Out of Luck, a 1996 album by The Lillingtons
- "Sol", a 2005 song by American post-metal band Rosetta from the album The Galilean Satellites
- "Sol", a 2014 song by American metalcore band Invent Animate from the album Everchanger
- "Sol", a 2022 song by British metalcore band Oceans Ate Alaska from the album Disparity

=== Gaming ===
- The Shadows of Luclin, sometimes referred to as SoL, an expansion to the Everquest computer game
- Sol Badguy, a character in the Guilty Gear video games
- Sol Squadron, an enemy squadron in the video game Ace Combat 7: Skies Unknown

=== Newspapers ===
- Sol (newspaper), a weekly newspaper published in Portugal
- soL (newspaper), a daily left-leaning newspaper published in Turkey

=== Other uses in arts and entertainment ===
- Sol (comedian), a creation of Marc Favreau
- Sol (film), a 2014 Canadian documentary
- Sol, a cat in Warriors (novel series)
- Sol, a sculpture by Kiyoshi Takahashi created for the Ruta de la Amistad in Mexico City

== Mythology ==
- Sol (Roman mythology), a Roman sun god
- Sól (Germanic mythology), a Germanic sun goddess

== People ==
- Sol (given name)
- Seol (surname)
- Sol., author citation (botany) for Daniel Solander (1733–1782), Swedish botanical author
- Sol (musician), hip hop performer Sol Moravia-Rosenberg
- Oliver Lieb (born 1969), sometimes known as S.O.L., German electronic music producer and DJ
- Taeyang or SOL (born 1988), Korean singer

== Politics ==
- Senator On-Line, an Australian political party
- Left Party (Turkey) (SOL Parti), a communist party
- The Social Liberals (Austria), a minor political party

== Science and technology ==
=== Computing ===
- Secure Operations Language
- Serial over LAN
- Simple Object Language, the ancestor of Lua programming language
- sol (format), a file format for presenting solutions of mathematical programming problems
- Sol-20, an early microcomputer produced by the Processor Technology Corporation
- Sol (laptop), a solar-powered laptop by WeWi Telecommunications
- .sol, a local shared object file format
- &sol;, the XML/HTML character entity for the slash (punctuation)

=== Medicine ===
- Sleep onset latency, length of time of the transition from full wakefulness to sleep
- Space-occupying lesion of the brain can be caused by different pathology such as a malignancy, an abscess or a haematoma

=== Other uses in science and technology ===
- Sol (colloid), a type of suspension
- Sol geometry, a three-dimensional Riemannian manifold
- Safety service, safety-of-life service (SoL)

== Sports ==
- Austin Sol, an Ultimate Frisbee Association team
- Los Angeles Sol, a defunct professional soccer team
- Miami Sol, a defunct Women's National Basketball Association team
- Sonoma County Sol, an American soccer team

== Transportation ==
- Sol (car marque), a car brand in the Chinese market
- Sol Líneas Aéreas, an airline in Argentina
- Sol Linhas Aéreas, an airline in Brazil
- Sol (Madrid Metro), a station on Line 1, 2 and 3
- Solana Beach station, a train station serving Solana Beach, California
- Stratford–Okahukura Line, a secondary railway line in New Zealand
- Honda CR-X del Sol, a small car manufactured by Honda

== Other uses ==
- Statute of limitations, in criminal prosecutions and civil litigation
- Skilled Occupation List, skilled occupations acceptable for migration to Australia
- Standards of Learning, a set of standards Virginia students must meet before graduation
- California State Prison, Solano (SOL), US
- Service d'ordre légionnaire, a collaborationist militia in Vichy, France
- Soľ, a village in eastern Slovakia
- Sol (river), in Russia
- Society for Organizational Learning, an American organization working on corporate sustainability
- Sol, an additional summer month in the proposed International Fixed Calendar
- Sol, a beer produced by the Cuauhtémoc Moctezuma Brewery
- Solomon Islands, IOC
- The Sol Foundation, a think tank based in California

== See also ==
- El Sol (disambiguation)
- Sól (disambiguation)
- Sols (disambiguation)
- Sol Invictus (disambiguation)
- Sole (disambiguation)
- Soul (disambiguation)
