= Argentine peso moneda nacional =

Currency of Argentina from 1881 to 1969

Peso Moneda Nacional (Spanish)

Unit
- Symbol: m$n or $ m/n

Denominations
- Superunit
- 5: argentino
- Subunit
- 1/100: centavo
- Symbol
- centavo: ¢
- Banknotes: 50 centavos, 1, 5, 10, 50, 100, 500, 1000, 5000, 10000 pesos
- Coins: 1, 2, 5, 10, 20, 50 centavos, 1, 5, 10, 25 pesos

Demographics
- Date of introduction: 5 November 1881
- Replaced: Argentine real Argentine peso fuerte Argentine peso moneda corriente
- Date of withdrawal: 1 January 1970
- Replaced by: Argentine peso ley
- User(s): Argentina

Issuance
- Central bank: Banco Central de la República Argentina
- Website: www.bcra.gov.ar
- This infobox shows the latest status before this currency was rendered obsolete.

The Peso Moneda Nacional (symbol: m$n), or simply peso, was the first unified national currency of Argentina. It was used from 5 November 1881 to 1 January 1970, the date in which the peso ley 18.188 was issued to the Argentine public. It was subdivided into 100 centavos, with the argentino worth 5 pesos. The peso was introduced to replace the Argentine peso moneda corriente at a rate of $ m/c 25 = m$n 1.

== History ==
The peso moneda nacional replaced the Argentine real at a rate of one to eight. It also replaced the peso fuerte at par and the peso moneda corriente at a rate of 25 pesos moneda corriente = 1 peso moneda nacional. The peso moneda nacional was itself replaced by the peso ley at a rate of one hundred to one.

The peso was initially pegged to the French franc at a rate of 1 peso = 5 francs. In 1883, when silver coins ceased production, the paper peso was set at a value of 2.2 francs or 638.7 mg gold. By 1891, the paper peso, which was at par with the gold unit in 1884, had depreciated to 3.87 per peso in gold. In 1899, the paper peso's relation to the gold peso was set to 2.25 paper pesos per gold peso. After a suspension in the gold standard from 1914, in 1927, a peg to the U.S. dollar was established of 2.36 pesos = 1 dollar. The rate changed to 1.71 pesos = 1 dollar in 1931, then to 3 pesos = 1 dollar in 1933. Between 1934 and 1939, the peso was pegged to sterling at a rate of 15 pesos = £1 (1 peso = 1s 4d). High inflation in the post-war period lead to the introduction of the peso ley 18.188 in 1970 at the rate of 100 pesos moneda nacional = 1 peso ley.

== Coins ==
In 1881, silver 10, 20 and 50 centavos and 1 peso and gold 1 argentino coins were introduced, followed by bronze 1 and 2 centavos the next year. Silver coins ceased production in 1883, with gold coins ending in 1896. Base metal 5, 10 and 20 centavos were introduced in 1896, with base 50 centavos following in 1941. The 1 peso was reintroduced in 1957, with 5, 10 and 25 pesos introduced in 1961, 1962 and 1964.

=== Centavo ===
Value	Obverse	Emission	Withdrawn	Composition	Diam.	Image
1	Liberty	1882–1896	21 April 1959	Bronze	25 mm	
1	Coat of arms	1939–1944	21 April 1959	Bronze	16 mm	
1	Coat of arms	1945–1948	21 April 1959	Copper	16 mm	
2	Liberty	1882–1896	21 April 1959	Bronze	30 mm	
2	Coat of arms	1939–1947	21 April 1959	Bronze	20 mm	
2	Coat of arms	1947–1950	21 April 1959	Copper	20 mm	
5	Liberty	1896–1942	31 January 1965	Copper-Nickel	17 mm	
5	Liberty	1942–1950	31 January 1965	Aluminium-Bronze	17 mm	
5	José de San Martín	1950–1953	31 January 1965	Copper-Nickel	17 mm	
5	José de San Martín	1953–1956	31 January 1965	Copper-Nickel-clad steel	17 mm	
5	Liberty	1957–1959	31 January 1965	Copper-Nickel-clad steel	17 mm	
10	Liberty	1881–1883		.900 Silver	18 mm	
10	Liberty	1896–1942	21 January 1966	Copper-Nickel	19 mm	
10	Liberty	1942–1950	21 January 1966	Aluminium-Bronze	19 mm	
10	José de San Martín	1950–1952	21 January 1966	Copper-Nickel	19 mm	
10	José de San Martín	1952–1956	21 January 1966	Nickel-clad steel	19 mm	
10	Liberty	1957–1959	21 January 1966	Nickel-clad steel	19 mm	
20	Liberty	1881–1883		.900 Silver	22 mm	
20	Liberty	1896–1942	31 January 1967	Copper-Nickel	21 mm	
20	Liberty	1942–1950	31 January 1967	Aluminium-Bronze	21 mm	
20	José de San Martín	1950–1952	31 January 1967	Copper-Nickel	21 mm	
20	José de San Martín	1952–1956	31 January 1967	Nickel-clad steel	21 mm	
20	Liberty	1957–1961	31 January 1967	Nickel-clad steel	21 mm	
50	Liberty	1881–1883		.900 Silver	29 mm	
50	Liberty	1941	31 January 1969	Nickel	24 mm	
50	José de San Martín	1952–1956	31 January 1969	Nickel-clad steel	23 mm	
50	Liberty	1957–1961	31 January 1969	Nickel-clad steel	23 mm	

=== Peso ===
Value	Obverse	Emission	Withdrawn	Composition	Diam.	Image
1	Liberty	1881–1883		.900 Silver	39 mm	
1	Liberty	1957–1962	1 October 1974	Nickel-clad steel	25 mm	
1	Buenos Aires Cabildo	1960	1 October 1974	Nickel-clad steel	25 mm	
5	Liberty	1881–1896		.900 Gold	23 mm	
5	President Sarmiento frigate	1961–1968	12 April 1976	Nickel-clad steel	21 mm	
10	Gaucho riding horse	1962–1968	12 July 1976	Nickel-clad steel	21 mm	
10	House of Tucumán	1966	12 July 1976	Nickel-clad steel	21 mm	
25	First national coin	1964–1968	12 July 1976	Nickel-clad steel	26 mm	
25	Domingo Faustino Sarmiento	1968	12 July 1976	Nickel-clad steel	26 mm	

== Banknotes ==
=== Provincial ===
There were several banknotes issued by provinces of Argentina, such as Buenos Aires (issued by its respective provincial entity (1883–85), Santa Fe (1882), Entre Ríos (1885), Córdoba (1889), Entre Ríos (1885), Chaco (1884), Salta (1884), and Tucumán (1888) provincial banks.

Banknotes issued by "Banco Provincia de Buenos Aires"
0,10 Pesos Oro	0,16 Pesos Oro	2 Pesos Oro	100 Pesos Oro	500 Pesos Oro

=== Banco Nacional ===
The first nationally issued banknotes were introduced by the "Banco Nacional" in 1883. These were in denominations of 5, 10, 20 and 50 centavos.

Banknotes issued by "Banco Nacional"
10 cent. (1884)	20 centavos	5 centavos	10 cent. (1895)

=== 1899–1935 issues ===
In 1891 and 1892, the same denominations were produced by the recently created "Banco de la Nación Argentina". In 1894, the Banco Nación introduced larger denomination notes for 1, 2, 5, 10, 20, 50, 100, 200, 500 and 1000 pesos.

Paper money production was taken over by the "Caja de Conversión" in 1899. That year, 50 centavos, 1 and 100 pesos were introduced, followed in 1900 by notes for 5, 10, 50, 500 and 1000 pesos. These notes were issued until 1935, when the Banco Central began to produce notes. Law 3505, of 20 September 1897, authorized the Caja de Conversión to renovate all paper money in existence at the time. They decided to make new design called "Progress's Effigy" ("Efigie del Progreso").

These bank notes were created originally in a bigger size and printed by the mint (Casa de Moneda), using French-made paper. Due to their size, and the paper not being of good enough quality, they began to deteriorate. They then decided to suspend the printing and look for another provider. The new notes, of smaller size, started to be issued in 1903, using typography as the printing method.

Value	Issue dates	Image (obverse / reverse)
50 Centavos	1899–1900, 1918–1926	
1 Peso	1900–1903, 1906–1935	
5 Pesos	1900–1935	
10 Pesos	1900–1935	
50 Pesos	1900–1935	
100 Pesos	1899–1932	
500 Pesos	1900–1901, 1905, 1909–1930, 1935	
1000 Pesos	1901, 1905, 1906, 1908, 1910–1934	

=== Banco Central ===
When the Central Bank of Argentina was established it took over the banknotes, which began to be printed by the Casa de Moneda. The banknotes designs were not modified until 1942, when the bank decided to introduce new designs, leaving the allegory of Liberty figure behind. Some series were printed in Great Britain.

The Banco Central issued the following banknotes:

Value	Obverse	Reverse	Emission start date	Withdrawn	Image (obverse / reverse)
0.50 (Note: 50 centavos)	Allegory of Liberty	National Constitution	1942	31 December 1960	
1	Justice	Casa de Tucumán	1935	31 December 1960	
5	José de San Martín	May Revolution	1935	31 January 1965	
10	José de San Martín	Oath of Independence	17 March 1936	31 January 1965	
50	José de San Martín	Crossing of the Andes (painting by Augusto Ballerini)	10 September 1936	30 March 1968	
50	José de San Martín	Crossing of the Andes	2 January 1943	30 September 1968	
100	José de San Martín	Founding of Buenos Aires (painting by José Moreno Carbonero)	14 August 1936	30 March 1968	
100	José de San Martín	Founding of Buenos Aires	23 December 1943	30 September 1968	
500	José de San Martín	Central Bank of Argentina	21 December 1944	30 March 1968	
500	José de San Martín	San Martín's house at Grand Bourg	25 November 1964	30 September 1968	
1,000	José de San Martín	Frigate Presidente Sarmiento	21 December 1944	1 July 1975	
5,000	José de San Martín	National Congress	4 October 1962	1 July 1975	
10,000	José de San Martín	San Martín and O'Higgins meeting	18 December 1961	1 July 1975	

== Bibliography ==
- Krause, Chester L.; Clifford Mishler (1991). Standard Catalog of World Coins: 1801–1991 (18th ed.). Krause Publications. ISBN 0873411501.
- Pick, Albert (1994). Bruce, Colin R. II; Shafer, Neil (eds.). Standard Catalog of World Paper Money: General Issues (7th ed.). Krause Publications. ISBN 0-87341-207-9.
- Silveyra, Jorge; Lozano, Sergio; Díaz, Oscar (2001). Falsificación de moneda. Editorial Policial. ISBN 950-9071-66-8.
