= Sol (album) =

Studio album by Eskmo
- Released: March 3, 2015
- Genre: Electronic
- Length: 36:44
- Label: Apollo Records

Eskmo chronology
Eskmo (2010)	Sol (2015)

Professional ratings
Aggregate scores
Source	Rating
Metacritic	66/100
Review scores
Source	Rating
AllMusic	3/5 stars

Sol is the second studio album by American electronic musician Eskmo. It was released in March 2015 under Apollo Records.

== Track listing ==
No.	Title	Length
1.	"Spvce"	2:11
2.	"Combustion"	3:42
3.	"Blue and Grey"	3:46
4.	"Mind of War"	3:11
5.	"Tamara"	2:20
6.	"Sol"	4:56
7.	"The Light of One Thousand Furnaces"	5:57
8.	"Feed Fire"	3:00
9.	"The Sun is a Drum"	3:47
10.	"Can't Taste"	3:54
