= El Sol =

El Sol is a Spanish phrase meaning "the sun". It may refer to:

== Newspapers ==
- El Sol (Santa Cruz), a Bolivian newspaper
- El Sol (Quito), an Ecuadoran newspaper; see Alejandro Carrión
- El Sol (Monterrey), a Mexican newspaper; owned by Grupo Reforma
- El Sol de Mexico, a Mexican newspaper owned by Organización Editorial Mexicana
- El Sol, a Peruvian newspaper; see Isabel Sabogal
- El Sol (Madrid), a defunct Spanish newspaper
- El Sol de Maturín, a Venezuelan newspaper
- El Sol (Stamford), an American newspaper
- El Sol de Salinas, an American weekly newspaper

== Other uses ==
- El Sol (bus line), Los Angeles, California, United States
- El Sol (festival), held annually in San Sebastián, Spain
- El Sol metro station, Valparaíso, Chile
- El Sol del Peru, an award bestowed by the nation of Peru
- SS El Sol, a cargo ship built in 1910
