= Argentine peso =

Currency of Argentina

peso argentino (Spanish)
- Series 2023

ISO 4217
- Code: ARS (numeric: 032)
- Subunit: 0.01

Units of account
- Base unit: peso
- Symbol: $ (Arg$)

Denominations
- Banknotes
- Freq. used: 1,000, 2,000, 10,000 and 20,000 pesos
- Rarely used: 10, 20, 50 (no longer circulated, still valid), 100, 200, 500
- Coins
- Rarely used: 1, 5, 10, 25, 50 centavos, bimetallic 1 and 2 pesos (no longer minted, still valid), (no longer circulated, still valid); 1, 2, 5, 10 pesos (2017 series), (no longer minted, still valid), (no longer circulated, still valid)

Demographics
- Replaced: Argentine austral
- User(s): Argentina

Issuance
- Central bank: Central Bank of the Argentine Republic
- Website: www.bcra.gov.ar

Valuation
- Inflation: 33.2% in May 2026
- Source: Central Bank of the Argentine Republic

The peso (established as the peso convertible; several older currencies were also named peso) is the currency of Argentina since 1992, identified within Argentina by the symbol $ preceding the amount in the same way as many countries using peso or dollar currencies. It is subdivided into 100 centavos, but with 10 pesos being worth about 1 US cent in early 2025, smaller denominations are not issued or in normal use. Its ISO 4217 code is ARS. It replaced the austral at a rate of 10,000 australes to one peso.

Argentine currency has experienced severe inflation, with periods of hyperinflation, since the mid-20th century, with periodic change of the currency valuation to a new version at a rate ranging from 100:1 to 10,000:1. A new peso introduced in 1992, officially the peso convertible de curso legal, was worth 10,000,000,000,000 (ten trillion) pesos moneda nacional, the currency in use until 1970. Since the early 21st century, the peso has experienced further substantial inflation, reaching 289.4% year-on-year in April 2024, the highest since the current peso was introduced in the Convertibility plan of 1991.

The official exchange rate for the United States dollar valued the peso convertible de curso legal at one US dollar at its introduction in 1992, which was maintained until early 2002. Afterwards, it went from a 3:1 exchange rate with the US dollar in 2003 to 178:1 in early 2023. On 14 August 2023, the official exchange rate was fixed at ARS$350 to one US dollar; the unregulated rate valued the peso at ARS$665 to one US dollar. On 15 November 2023, the crawling peg was restored.

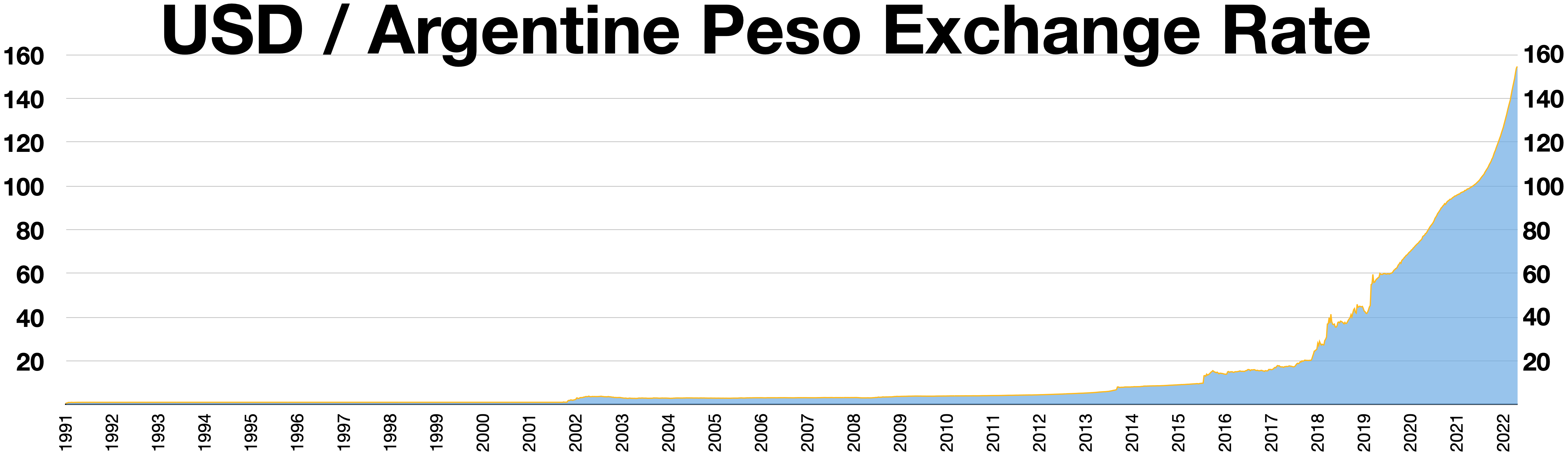
USD/Argentine Peso exchange rate

On 12 December 2023, following the election of president Javier Milei, economy minister Luis Caputo changed the official exchange rate to 800 pesos to the U.S. dollar from the previous 366.5, a devaluation of 54%, to be followed by a monthly devaluation target of 2% (about 27% per year). At the time, the unofficial exchange rate was around 1,000 pesos per dollar. The monthly devaluation target was lowered to 1% in February 2025 after inflation eased.

From 14 April 2025 on, the official peso is set to freely float within a currency band of 1,000 to 1,400 pesos per dollar, as part of an agreement with the International Monetary Fund. Since then, as a consequence of the liberalization of the currency market, the official and unofficial rates have remained close to each other. The upper limit of the trading band was breached in September and October 2025, triggering interventions by the Argentine central bank and United States Treasury in the foreign exchange market, by buying pesos, to keep the exchange rate within the limits of the currency band.

== History ==
Amounts in earlier pesos were sometimes preceded by a "$" sign and sometimes, particularly in formal use, by symbols identifying that it was the specific currency in use at the time, for example "$ m/n100" or "m$n100" for pesos moneda nacional. The currency introduced in 1992 was called peso convertible, simplified to just peso in 2002. A value in pesos is written with a preceding "$" sign only. Earlier pesos had replaced currencies also called peso, and sometimes two varieties of peso coexisted, making it necessary to have a distinguishing term to use, at least in the transitional period; the 1992 peso replaced a currency with a different name, austral.

=== Peso before 1826 ===
The peso was a name often used for the silver Spanish eight-real coin. Following independence, Argentina began issuing its own coins, denominated in reales, soles and escudos, including silver eight-real (or sol) coins still known as pesos. These coins, together with those from neighbouring countries, circulated until 1881.

=== Peso fuerte, 1826–1881 ===
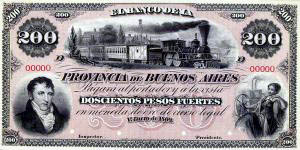
200 pesos fuertes banknote issued in 1869

In 1826, two paper money issues began, denominated in pesos. One, the peso fuerte ($F) was a convertible currency, with 17 pesos fuerte equal to one Spanish ounce (27.0643 g) of 0.916 fine gold. It was replaced by the peso moneda nacional at par in 1881.

=== Peso moneda corriente, 1826–1881 ===
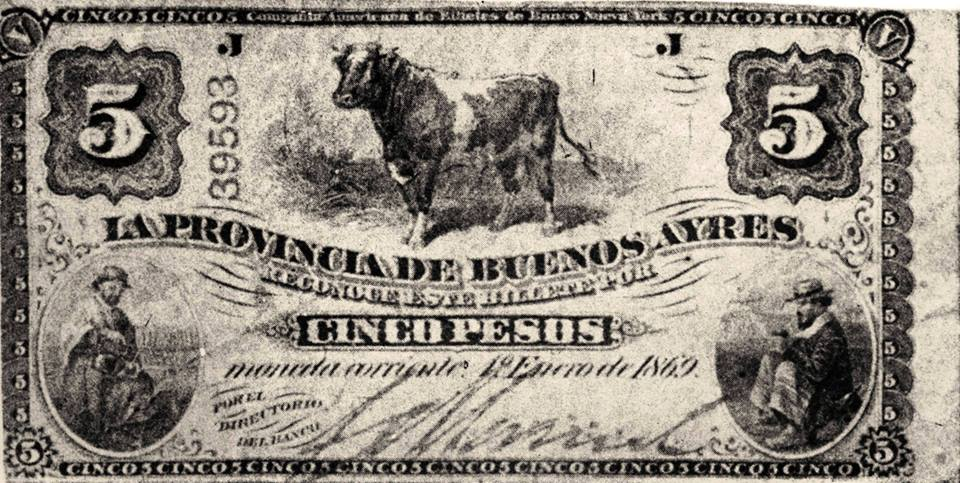
"Cinco pesos" moneda corriente banknote, issued 1869

The non-convertible peso moneda corriente (everyday currency) ($m/c) was also introduced in 1826. It started at par with the peso fuerte, but depreciated with time. Although the Argentine Confederation issued 1-, 2- and 4-centavo coins in 1854, with 100 centavos equal to 1 peso = 8 reales, Argentina did not decimalize until 1881. The peso moneda nacional (m$n or $m/n) replaced the earlier currencies at the rate of 1 peso moneda nacional = 8 reales = 1 peso fuerte = 25 peso moneda corriente. Initially, one peso moneda nacional coin was made of silver and known as patacón. However, the 1890 economic crisis ensured that no further silver coins were issued.

=== Gold and silver pesos, 1881–1970 ===
The Argentine gold coin from 1875 was the gold peso fuerte, one and two-thirds of a gram of gold of fineness 900, equivalent to one and a half grams of fine gold, defined by Law no. 733 of 1875. This unit was based on that recommended by the European Congress of Economists in Paris in 1867 and adopted by Japan in 1873 (the Argentine 5 peso fuerte coin was equivalent to the Japanese 5 yen). However, these provisions were not implemented.

The system before 1881 has been described as "monetary anarchism" (anarquía monetaria). Law no. 1130 of 1881 put an end to this; it established the monetary unit as the peso oro sellado ("stamped gold peso"), a coin of 1.612 g of gold of fineness 900 (90%), and the silver peso, 25 g of silver of fineness 900. Gold coins of 5 and 2.5 pesos were to be used, silver coins of one peso and 50, 20, 10 and 5 centavos, and copper coins of 2 and 1 centavos.

=== Peso moneda nacional, 1881–1970 ===
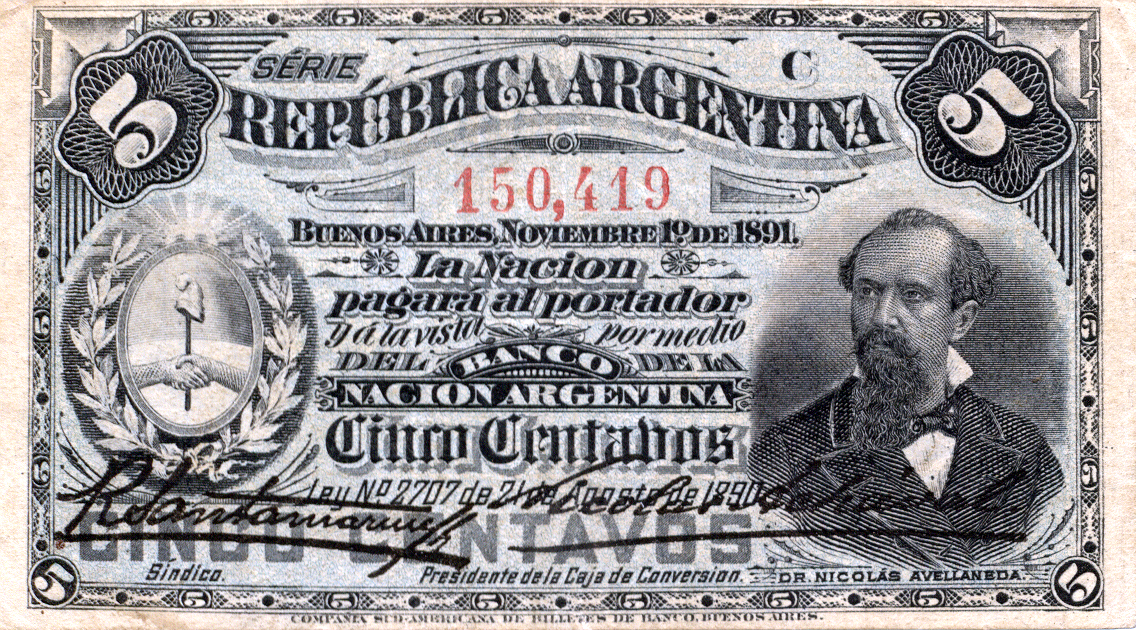
5 cents moneda nacional banknote featuring Nicolás Avellaneda, 1891

The depreciated peso moneda corriente was replaced in 1881 by the paper peso moneda nacional (national currency, (m$n or $m/n)) at a rate of 25 to 1. This currency was used from 1881 until 1 January 1970. The design was changed in 1899, and again in 1942. Initially, the peso m$n was convertible, with a value of one peso oro sellado. Convertibility was maintained off and on, with decreasing value in gold, until it was finally abandoned in 1929, when m$n 2.2727 was equivalent to one peso oro.

=== Peso ley, 1970–1983 ===
The peso ley 18.188 (ISO 4217: ARL) (informally called the peso ley) replaced the previous currency at a rate of 1 peso ley to 100 pesos moneda nacional.

=== Peso argentino, 1983–1985 ===
The peso argentino ($a) (ISO 4217: ARP) replaced the previous currency at a rate of 1 peso argentino to 10,000 pesos ley (1 million pesos m$n). The currency was introduced just before the return of democracy, on 1 June 1983. However, it rapidly lost its purchasing power, was devalued several times, and was replaced by a new currency called the austral in June 1985.

=== Austral, 1985–1991 ===
The austral ("₳") (ISO 4217: ARA) replaced the peso argentino at a rate of 1 austral to 1,000 pesos (one billion pesos m$n). During the period of circulation of the austral, Argentina suffered from hyperinflation. The last months of President Raul Alfonsín's period in office in 1989 saw prices increase constantly (200% in July alone), reflected in a worsening exchange rate. Emergency notes of 10,000, 50,000 and 500,000 australes were issued, and provincial administrations issued their own currency for the first time in decades. The value of the currency stabilized two years after President Carlos Menem was elected.

=== Peso convertible, since 1992 ===
In 1992 a new peso (ISO 4217: ARS) was introduced, referred to as peso convertible since the international exchange rate was fixed by the Central Bank at 1 peso to 1 U.S. dollar, and for every peso convertible circulating, there was a US dollar in the Central Bank's foreign currency reserves. It replaced the austral at a rate of 1 peso = 10,000 australes. After the various changes of currency and dropping of zeros, one peso convertible of 1992 was equivalent to 10 trillion pesos moneda nacional of 1970.

After the financial crisis of 2001, the fixed exchange rate system was abandoned in January 2002, and the exchange rate fluctuated, up to a peak of four pesos to one dollar (a 75% devaluation) at the time. The resulting export boom produced a massive inflow of dollars into the Argentine economy, which helped lower their price. For a time the administration stated and maintained a strategy of keeping the exchange rate at between 2.90 and 3.10 pesos per US dollar, in order to maintain the competitiveness of exports and encourage the replacement of imports by local industries. When necessary, the Central Bank issues pesos and buys dollars in the free market (sometimes large amounts, of the order of 10 to US$100 million per day) to keep the dollar price from dropping, and had amassed over US$27 billion in reserves before the US$9.81 billion payment to the International Monetary Fund in January 2006.

The effect of this may be compared to the neighboring Brazilian real, which was roughly on par with the Argentine peso until the beginning of 2003, when both currencies were about three per U.S. dollar. The real started gaining in value more than the peso due to Brazil's slower build-up of dollar reserves; by 29 December 2009, a real was worth almost 2.2 pesos. In December 2015, US dollar exchange restrictions were removed in Argentina following the election of President Mauricio Macri. As a result, the difference between the official rate and the unofficial "blue" rate almost disappeared for a time. The official exchange rate was on 1 April 2016 of 14.4 to US$1. The rate gradually worsened; on 29 July 2022 one U.S. dollar was quoted at 131.22 pesos at the official rate and 298 pesos, 2.27 times higher (+127%), in unregulated markets. By September 2023, the official exchange rate had reached 350 pesos to the dollar, and over 720 pesos on unregulated markets.

On 12 December 2023, following the election of president Javier Milei, economy minister Luis Caputo changed the official exchange rate to 800 pesos to the dollar from the previous 366.5, a devaluation of 54%. At the time, the unofficial exchange rate was around 1,000 pesos per dollar. This was followed by a monthly devaluation target of 2%, being afterwards lowered to 1% in February 2025 after inflation eased. From 14 April 2025 on, the official peso has operated within a currency band of 1000 to 1400 pesos per dollar, as part of an agreement with the International Monetary Fund. Since then, as a consequence of the liberalization of the currency market, the official and unofficial rates have remained close to each other. The upper limit of the trading band was breached in September and October 2025, triggering interventions by the Argentine central bank and the United States Treasury in the foreign exchange market, by buying pesos, to keep the exchange rate within the limits of the currency band.

== Coins ==
In 1992, 1, 5, 10, 25 and 50 centavo coins were introduced, followed by 1 peso in 1994. Two-peso coins were introduced in 2010. One-centavo coins were last minted in 2001. In 2017 a new series of coins was issued in denominations of $1 and $5, followed by $2 and $10 in 2018. While they are still legal tender, they are not accepted in stores and bank branches due to their negligible value and inconvenience in storage.

Circulating coins of the Argentine peso (1st series)
Value	Obverse / reverse	Ref
1 centavo	Laurel wreath and legend "in union and liberty"	
5 centavos	Sun of May	
10 centavos	Argentine coat	
25 centavos	Cabildo of Buenos Aires	
50 centavos	Casa de Tucumán	
1 peso	Argentine arms/Sun of May	
2 pesos	Sun of May	

Circulating coins of the Argentine peso (2nd series)
Value	Obverse	Reverse	Ref.
1 peso	Jacaranda	Ceibo	
2 pesos	Palo Borracho	Ceibo	
5 pesos	Arrayán	Ceibo	
10 pesos	Caldén	Ceibo	

=== Commemorative coins ===
Commemorating the National Constitutional Convention, 2 and 5-peso nickel coins were issued in 1994.

Commemorative coins
Value	Issued	Obverse	Reverse	Conmemorates	Ref
50 cent.	1996	UNICEF logo	A girl holding a doll	50th. anniversary of UNICEF	
50 cent.	1997		Eva Duarte	50th anniversary of the death of Eva Perón and the attainment of voting rights by women	
50 cent.	1998		Mercosur logo	Establishment of Mercosur	
50 cent.	2000		Martín Miguel de Güemes	Death of Güemes	
50 cent.	2001		José de San Martín	Death of San Martín	
1 peso	1996	UNICEF logo	A girl holding a doll	50th. anniversary of UNICEF	
1 peso	1997		Eva Duarte	50th anniversary of the death of Eva Perón and the attainment of voting rights by women	
1 peso	1998		Mercosur logo	Establishment of Mercosur	
1 peso	2001	San José palace	Justo José de Urquiza	Death of Gral. Urquiza	
2 pesos	1994	National Constitution	Argentine coats of arms	National Constitution Convention	
5 pesos	1994	National Constitution	Argentine coats of arms	National Constitution Convention	
2 pesos	2007	Islas Malvinas	Argentine soldier	25th. anniversary of the Malvinas War	

2 peso coins were issued in 1999 to commemorate the centenary of the birth of writer Jorge Luis Borges, with Borges portrayed on the obverse and a labyrinth and the Hebrew letter aleph on the reverse. On 18 September 2002, a 2-peso coin with Eva Perón's face was introduced to commemorate the 50th anniversary of her death; this coin was to replace the AR$2 banknote if inflation continued to be high. None of the 2-peso coins are widely circulated.

Some other 50-centavo and 1-peso coins commemorate different events, including the 50th anniversary of the creation of UNICEF (1996), the attainment of voting rights by women (1997), the establishment of Mercosur (1998), and the death of José de San Martín (2001). Several 1 peso coins were issued in 2010 to commemorate the bicentennial of the May Revolution, all featuring the same obverse, different from the main series, and images of different places on the reverse, including Mar del Plata, the Perito Moreno Glacier, Mount Aconcagua, the Pucará de Tilcara, and El Palmar.

== Banknotes of the peso convertible (since 1992) ==
=== First series (Convertibles, 1992) ===
In 1992, the first series of peso convertible banknotes were introduced in denominations of 1, 2, 5, 10, 20, 50, and 100 pesos. The 1-peso note was replaced by a coin in 1994. Until 2001 banknotes bore the legend "Convertibles de curso legal", meaning that their value was fixed to the same amount in US dollars. As most older bills have been replaced, it is rare to find ones marked as convertible except in the $100 denominations. All bills are 155 × 65 mm in size.

Value	Color	Description			Issue
Value	Color	Obverse	Reverse	Watermark	Issue
$2	Blue	Bartolomé Mitre; replica of a handwritten manuscript of Historia de Belgrano y de la Independencia Argentina and contrapuerta of his house	Museo Mitre	Bartolomé Mitre and his initials	26 November 1997 – 30 April 2018
$5	Green	José de San Martín; replica of his will and reproduction of Abrazo de Maipú, painting by Pedro Subercaseaux depicting the hug shared by San Martín and Bernardo O'Higgins that sealed Chile's independence	Monument to the Army of the Andes, Cerro de la Gloria; Order of the Liberator General San Martín medal	José de San Martín and his initials	22 June 1998 – 29 February 2020
$5	Green	José de San Martín and the Order of the Liberator	José Artigas, Simón Bolívar, José de San Martín, and Bernardo O'Higgins	José de San Martín and his initials	1 October 2015 – 29 February 2020
$10	Brown	Manuel Belgrano; replica of an 1812 report by him to the government of the United Provinces of the Río de la Plata and reproduction of La Patria Abanderada by Alfredo Bigatti at the National Flag Memorial	National Flag Memorial; drum —in remembrance of drummer boy Pedro Ríos who died at the Battle of Tacuarí— and typical textile pattern from the Argentine Northwest	Manuel Belgrano and his initials	14 January 1999
$10	Brown, green, blue and purple	Manuel Belgrano	Juana Azurduy de Padilla and Manuel Belgrano on horseback with swords raised to the new flag on 27 February 1812, along the Paraná River	Manuel Belgrano and electrotype MB	4 April 2016
$20	Red	Juan Manuel de Rosas; reproduction of Retrato de Manuelita Rosas by Prilidiano Pueyrredón, which depicts his daughter Manuela Rosas	Battle of Vuelta de Obligado; reproduction of the military trophies included in the 8 reales coin of 1840	Juan Manuel de Rosas and his initials	18 January 2000
$50	Black	Domingo Faustino Sarmiento; reproduction of a manuscript of Vida de Dominguito, biography of his adopted son, who died at the Battle of Curupayty	Casa Rosada; motifs to his various activities: La Porteña locomotive, European immigration and Facundo (1845), a cornerstone of Latin American literature	Domingo Faustino Sarmiento and his initials	19 July 1999
$50	Blue	The Falkland Islands, South Georgia and the South Sandwich Islands	Antonio Rivero, the Argentine Military Cemetery, light cruiser General Belgrano, the Falkland Islands, and the dolphin gull	Falkland Islands and electrotype IM (for Islas Malvinas)	2 March 2015
$100	Violet	Julio Argentino Roca, replica of a letter Roca sent to Miguel Cané (a diplomat), and evocation of Argentine progress under the sun of the future	Conquest of the Desert — The painting La Conquista del Desierto by Juan Manuel Blanes; evocation of Roca as a statesman and military man: handwritten sheets of paper, the saber and a laurel branch	Julio Argentino Roca and his initials	3 December 1999
$100	Violet	Eva Perón; based on the design of a 5-peso banknote planned to be released following her 1952 death, but unreleased due to the coup that deposed President Juan Perón	From the Ara Pacis: a goddess with toddlers	Eva Perón and her initials	20 September 2012

=== Second series (Nuevo diseño (New design), 1997) ===
Introduced in 1997. In the issues following the year 2002, the term 'peso convertible de curso legal' was removed from the banknotes as established by Law 25.561. These banknotes remain in use, coexisting with later series, as of 2026. The 2-peso banknotes were withdrawn from circulation on 30 April 2018, being replaced by coins of the same denomination from the first and second series of coins. Similarly, the 5-peso banknotes were withdrawn from circulation on 29 February 2020.

Denomination	Main color	Obverse	Reverse	Legal tender from/to
$2 (series A-B-C-D-E-F-G-H-I-J-K-L-M)	Blue	Bartolomé Mitre	Museo Mitre	1997-2018
$5 (series A-B-C-D-E-F-G-H-I-J)	Green	José de San Martín	Cerro de la Gloria	1998-2020
$10 (series A-B-C-D-E-F-G-H-I-J-K-L-M-N-Ñ-O-P-Q)	Brown	Manuel Belgrano	Monumento a la Bandera	1998- (current)
$20 (series A-B-C-D-E-F-G)	Red	Juan Manuel de Rosas	Combate de la Vuelta de Obligado	1999- (current)
$50 (series A-B-C-D-E-F-G-H-I)	Black	Domingo Faustino Sarmiento	Pirámide de Mayo y Casa de Gobierno	1999- (current)
$100 (series A-B-C-D-E-F-G-H-I-J-K-L-M-N-Ñ-O-P-Q-R-S-T-U-V-W-X-Y-Z -AA-BA-CA-DA-EA-FA-GA)	Purple	Julio Argentino Roca	La Conquista del Desierto (oil painting by Juan Manuel Blanes)	1999- (current)

=== Third series (Tenemos Patria (We have a country), 2013) ===
Introduced in 2013. These banknotes remain in use, coexisting with later series, as of 2026. All the banknotes of this series were announced with a title that identifies them: 5 pesos San Martín. The Dream of the Great Homeland, 10 pesos Manuel Belgrano. High in the Sky, 20 pesos Juan Manuel de Rosas. Heroes of the Paraná, 50 pesos Malvinas Islands. A Sovereign Love, 100 pesos Eva Perón. A Moment Towards Eternity, and 100 pesos Memory, Truth, and Justice. A Path to Identity. On 4 April 2016, it was announced that the series of 100-peso banknotes featuring María Eva Duarte de Perón would be extended with the letters AA, and it also includes a new security feature on its sides for people with visual impairments. 5-peso notes were removed from circulation 29 February 2020.

Denomination	Main color	Obverse	Reverse	Legal tender from/to
$5 (series A-B-C)	Green	José de San Martín	Libertadores de América: Artígas, Bolívar, San Martín y O'Higgins	2015-2020
$10 (series A-B-C)	Brown	Manuel Belgrano	Juana Azurduy and first raising of the national flag and oath of Belgrano's soldiers.	2016- (current)
$20	Red	Juan Manuel de Rosas and Lucio Norberto Mansilla	Battle of Vuelta de Obligado	cancelled
$50 (series A-B)	Blue	Falkland Islands, South Georgia Islands and South Sandwich Islands	Gaucho Antonio Rivero with the Argentine flag, the Darwin cemetery, and the ARA General Belgrano	2015- (current)
$100 (series A-B-C-D-E-F-G-H-I-J-K-L-M -N-Ñ-O-P-Q-R-S-T-U-V-W-X-Y-Z -AA-BA-CA-DA-EA-FA-GA-HA-IA-JA)	Purple	María Eva Duarte de Perón	Detail of the frieze of the Roman Altar of the Peace of Augustus (Ara Pacis)	2012- (current)
$100	Grey	Effigy of Liberty showing the white handkerchief of the Madres de Plaza de Mayo	Mothers and grandmothers march, dove of peace and DNA sequencing	cancelled

=== Fourth series (Native Fauna of Argentina series, 2016) ===
In 2016, the Banco Central de la República Argentina issued a new series of banknotes, with the 200- and 500-peso banknotes as the newest denominations. New 20- and 1,000-peso notes were issued in 2017, and new banknotes of 50 and 100 pesos were issued in 2018. A new series of coins in denominations of $1, $2, $5, and $10 was issued from 2018. These banknotes remain in use, coexisting with later series, as of 2026.

Value	Color	Description			Issue
Value	Color	Obverse	Reverse	Watermark	Issue
$20	Red	Guanaco	Patagonian Desert	Guanaco and electrotype 20	3 October 2017
$50	Gray	Andean condor	Aconcagua	Andean condor and electrotype 50	15 August 2018
$100	Violet	Taruca	Sierra de Famatina	Taruca and electrotype 100	18 December 2018
$200	Blue	Southern right whale	Valdes Peninsula	Whale and electrotype 200	26 October 2016
$500	Green	Jaguar	Yungas	Jaguar and electrotype 500	29 June 2016
$1,000	Orange	Hornero	Pampas	Hornero and electrotype 1000	1 December 2017

==== 5,000-peso design concept ====
The design concept of a banknote of 5,000 pesos was shown on 16 May 2020. The note was not issued, but the design was used for the $2,000 note announced in February 2023.

=== Fifth Series (Heroínas y héroes de nuestra historia – "Heroines and heroes of our history", 2023) ===
In May 2022, the Banco Central de la República Argentina ("Central Bank of the Argentine Republic") announced a new series of 100-, 200-, 500-, and 1,000-peso notes, replacing the animal motifs of the 2016 series with pictures of Argentine historical figures and events while maintaining the color scheme, to be released within the following six months; however, no plans to put these designs into circulation have been made as of May 2023. In March 2023 a $2,000 note was issued, portraying the Instituto Malbrán and pioneering doctors Cecilia Grierson and Ramón Carrillo. It does not have a security thread, and uses the design and plates originally intended for the $5,000 note described in May 2020. The new $2,000 note was put into circulation on 22 May 2023.

On 11 January 2024, the Central Bank announced that it would issue 10,000-peso and 20,000-peso notes by June 2024. The design that was for the 500-peso note will be used for the 10,000-peso instead. As of early 2024, the banknotes most often used were of 1,000, 2,000, and 10,000 pesos. Because of extremely high inflation, 10-, 20-, and 50-peso banknotes no longer circulated, and even 100-, 200-, and 500-peso banknotes were seldom seen. Cancelled notes (planned but not issued):

Value	Color	Description		Issue
Value	Color	Obverse & watermark	Reverse	Issue
$100	Violet	Eva Perón	The extension of the right to vote to women in Argentina in 1947	Cancelled
$200	Blue	Martín Miguel de Güemes and Juana Azurduy	Gaucho war; soldiers on horseback	Cancelled
$500	Green	Manuel Belgrano and María Remedios del Valle	Soldiers pledging allegiance to the Argentine flag in 1812	Cancelled

Current notes:

Value	Color	Description		Issue
Value	Color	Obverse & watermark	Reverse	Issue
$1,000	Orange	José de San Martín	Crossing of the Andes	May 2022
$2,000	Red/Gray	Ramón Carrillo and Cecilia Grierson	Carlos Malbrán National Institute of Microbiology	May 2023
$10,000	Cyan	Manuel Belgrano and María Remedios del Valle	Soldiers pledging allegiance to the Argentine flag in 1812	May 2024
$20,000	Blue	Juan Bautista Alberdi	Juan Bautista Alberdi's birthplace	Nov 2024

== Exchange rates ==
At the end of 2011, exchange control measures were implemented, which managed to reduce capital flight by 85%. One consequence of these measures was the appearance of multiple exchange rates and a parallel market (colloquially called the "blue dollar"), which was accessed by individuals and companies. From 14 April 2025 on, the official peso has operated within a currency band of 1000 to 1400 pesos per dollar, as part of an agreement with the International Monetary Fund. Since then, as a consequence of the liberalization of the currency market, the official and unofficial (parallel) rates have remained close to each other. The upper limit of the trading band was breached in September and October 2025, triggering interventions by both the Argentine central bank and United States Treasury in the foreign exchange market, by buying pesos, to keep the exchange rate within the limits of the currency band.

Special official exchange rates are sometimes created and abolished, to support sectors of the economy. There has been a "soybean dollar", a special rate for soybean exports, that was applicable between 5 and 30 September 2022, between 20 November and 30 December 2022, again between 8 April and 31 May 2023, and again from 5 September to 25 October 2023. A "corn dollar" for corn exports existed between 25 July and 31 August 2023. On 4 November 2022. a "foreign tourist dollar" rate close to the black market rate (355 pesos to the dollar instead of the official 195 at the end of February 2023) was introduced, for purchases made with foreign payment cards. This was to encourage people to still visit the country while attempting to discourage them from using the currency black market. Tourist dollars spent in January 2023 were nearly five times as many as in January 2022.

== See also ==
- Casa de Moneda de la República Argentina – Argentine mint
- Economy of Argentina
- Historical exchange rates of Argentine currency
