= Sól =

Sól may refer to:

- Sól (Germanic mythology), a goddess who personifies the sun in Germanic mythology
- Sól, Lublin Voivodeship, east Poland
- Sól, Masovian Voivodeship, east-central Poland
- Sól, Silesian Voivodeship, south Poland
- Sowilo rune or Sól

== See also ==
- Sol (disambiguation)
