= Argentine peso moneda corriente =

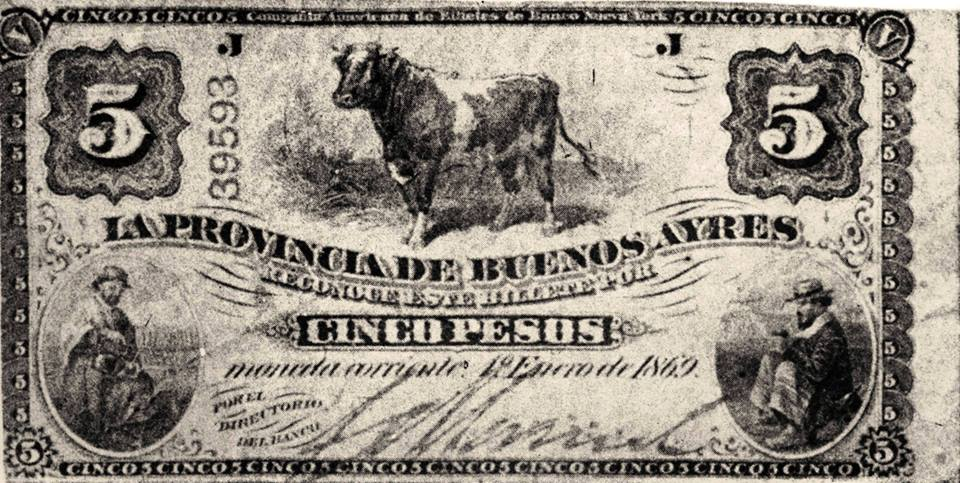
- "Cinco pesos" moneda corriente banknote, issued in 1869

Unit
- Symbol: $ m/c
- Subunit

Demographics
- Date of introduction: 9 January 1826
- Date of withdrawal: 4 November 1881
- User(s): Argentina
- This infobox shows the latest status before this currency was rendered obsolete.

The peso moneda corriente was a non-convertible Argentine paper currency which circulated between 9 January 1826, and 4 November 1881. It was worth eight reales. Its symbol was $m/c. It was also known as the peso papel (paper money).

It was also known by the name of the peso papel as opposed to the Peso Fuerte ($F) and the gold or silver coins of previous issues. It circulated almost exclusively in the Buenos Aires Province, since in the interior of the country only metallic coins were used during that time, such as the old Bolivian silver peso, and also, to a lesser extent, coins from other countries. “It was the role of the province of Buenos Aires –or current currency- that really imposed the monetary practices, evicting silver and gold from circulation.”

== Overview ==
The peso moneda corriente was not the first paper money issued in Argentina as the Banco de Buenos Aires had already issued paper money in 1822, but it was convertible into cash. The inconvertibility decreed in January 1826 was due to the economic problems caused by the War in Brazil. There was an exception: the period from January 3, 1867, to May 17, 1876, in which it was convertible at the rate of $m/c 25 = $F 1 at the Exchange Office of the Banco de la Provincia de Buenos Aires. The return of inconvertibility was due to the exchange rate run caused by the crisis of the 70s. gold first and the strong peso later.

The peso moneda corriente was introduced at par with the peso fuerte ($F) but gradually depreciated relative to it during its life. In the period from 3 January 1867 to 17 May 1876, the peso moneda corriente could be converted to gold, at the rate $ m/c 25 = $F1, in the Oficina de Cambios (exchange office) of the Banco de la Provincia de Buenos Aires. The office closed in 1876 because the people exchanged pesos for gold in large quantities. The peso moneda corriente was replaced by the peso moneda nacional at the rate of 25 pesos moneda corriente = 1 peso moneda nacional.

During the period the peso moneda corriente was in use, currencies from other countries were also used (especially the Bolivian boliviano).

The peso moneda corriente was replaced by the "Peso Oro Sellado" or gold weight at a rate of $m/c 25 = o$s 1 as of November 1881, at that time also equal to the Argentine peso moneda nacional. Article 13 of Law 1,130 -which established the gold weight- mandated that "Issuing Banks that exist in the Republic must, within two years of enactment of this Law, renew all their issuance in banknotes, to national currency".

== Banknotes ==
=== Banco de Buenos Ayres issues ===
Denom.	Issued	Obverse	Image
1 peso	1827	Simón Bolivar and George Washington	
5 pesos	1827	Benjamin Franklin and William Penn	
10 pesos	1828	Simón Bolivar and George Washington	
20 pesos	1827	Simón Bolivar and George Washington	
50 pesos	1827	Simón Bolivar and George Washington	
100 pesos	1827	?	
500 pesos	1827	?	
1000 pesos	1827	?	

=== Banco Nacional de la Provincias Unidas issues ===
Denom.	Issued	Obverse	Image
1 peso	1834	Argentine coat of arms	
5 pesos	1838	Female allegories	
10 pesos	1834	Female allegories	
20 pesos	1834	Female allegories	
50 pesos	1834	Female allegories	
100 pesos	1834	Female allegories	
200 pesos	1834	Female allegories	
500 pesos	1834	Argentine coat of arms	

=== Casa de Moneda de Buenos Ayres issues ===
Banknotes issued during the government of Juan Manuel de Rosas (1835–1852). They included the legend "Viva la Federación".

Denom.	Issued	Obverse	Image
1 peso	1841	Woman	
5 pesos	1841	Ñandú	
10 pesos	1841	Sheep	
20 pesos	1841	Horse	
50 pesos	1841	Cow	
100 pesos	1841	Cabildo of Buenos Aires	
200 pesos	1841	Port of Buenos Aires	

=== Casa de Moneda de Buenos Ayres issues ===
A second series was issued during the government of Rosas. The legend ""Viva la Confederación Argentina... Mueran los Salvajes Unitarios" was introduced.

Denom.	Issued	Obverse	Image
1 peso	1844	Argentine coat of arms	
5 pesos	1844	Ñandú	
10 pesos	1844	Sheep	
20 pesos	1844	Horse	
50 pesos	1844	Cow	
50 pesos	1848	Cow	
100 pesos	1845	Cabildo of Buenos Aires	
100 pesos	1848	?	
200 pesos	1848	Port of Buenos Aires	
500 pesos	1845	?	
500 pesos	1849	?	
500 pesos	1851	Woman with children	
1,000 pesos	1847	Liberty	
