= Sols =

Sols may refer to:

- The plural of sol (colloid)
- Alberto Sols (1917–1989), Spanish biochemist
- Sols (cartoonist) (born 1949), professional name of the famous Australian cartoonist Alan Salisbury
- Standards of Learning, the educational standards in Virginia
- Martian days, see Sol (day on Mars)
- the Scottish Organisation of Labour Students, a former name for Scottish Labour Students

SoLS may refer to:

- TUM School of Life Sciences

== See also ==
- Sol (disambiguation)
