= Caja de conversión =

The caja de conversión was the body responsible for maintaining the value of the Argentine peso in gold, as part of the currency board that operated in Argentina before 1935. It was a precursor of sorts to the Argentine Currency Board of the 1990s.

== See also ==
- Gold standard
