= Eskmo (album) =

Studio album by Eskmo
- Released: October 4, 2010
- Genre: Electronic; dubstep; glitch
- Length: 49:21
- Label: Ninja Tune
- Producer: Brendan Angelides

Eskmo chronology
Ascension (2003)	Eskmo (2010)	SOL (2015)

Eskmo is the debut studio album by Brendan Angelides as Eskmo. It was released through Ninja Tune in 2010. It has received generally favorable reviews from critics.

== Critical reception ==
Professional ratings
Aggregate scores
Source	Rating
AnyDecentMusic?	5.5/10
Metacritic	66/100
Review scores
Source	Rating
AllMusic	4/5 stars
Fact	4/5
Mojo	3/5 stars
MSN Music (Expert Witness)	A−
Pitchfork	4.8/10
PopMatters	4/10 stars
Resident Advisor	2.0/5
URB	3.5/5 stars

At Metacritic, which assigns a weighted average score out of 100 to reviews from mainstream critics, the album received an average score of 66, based on 10 reviews, indicating "generally favorable reviews".

Svein Brunstad of URB commented that "There's too much noise between the highlights, and even though he has his own signature production, you get tired of listen[ing] to the same industrial basslines and vocal mumblings ten times over." Brian Howe of Pitchfork wrote, "In particular, the record's home stretch is just kind of a mess, seeming to lose all regard for melodic and rhythmic center."

== Track listing ==
All tracks are written by Brendan Angelides.

No.	Title	Length
1.	"Cloudlight"	3:56
2.	"We Got More"	4:10
3.	"Color Dropping"	4:03
4.	"The Melody"	4:20
5.	"You Go, I See That"	1:54
6.	"We Have Invisible Friends (Washed Mix)"	5:00
7.	"Become Matter Soon, for You"	3:48
8.	"Moving Glowstream"	3:50
9.	"Starships"	4:18
10.	"Communication"	3:10
11.	"Siblings"	4:48
12.	"Gold & Stone"	4:01
13.	"My Gears Are Starting to Tremble"	1:41
Total length:		49:21

== Personnel ==
Credits adapted from liner notes.

- Brendan Angelides – vocals, production
- Twerk – mastering
- Khomatech – artwork
