= SOL Project =

French complementary currency project

The SOL Project is an innovative French complementary currency designed to promote a "solidarity economy". The project is being financed by the European Commission and pilot tested in Nord-Pas-de-Calais, Île-de-France and Brittany.

SOL was initiated by Patrick Viveret and Dominique Picard and has received praise from president Jacques Chirac. Supporters who believe that SOL will raise the standard of living for low income participants while building local economies.

== See also ==
- Ethical banking
