= Argentine real =

Currency of Argentina from 1813 to 1881

Real argentino (Spanish)

Unit
- Symbol: $

Denominations
- Superunit
- 16: escudo
- 8: peso
- Subunit
- 1/10: décimo
- Banknotes: 1, 2, 3, 5, 10, 20, 40, 50, 100, 200, 500, 1000 pesos
- Coins: 1/2, 1, 2, 4, 8 reales, 1/2, 1, 2, 4 and 8 soles, 1, 2, 4, 8 escudos

Demographics
- Date of withdrawal: 5 November 1881
- Replaced by: Argentine peso moneda nacional
- User(s): Argentina
- This infobox shows the latest status before this currency was rendered obsolete.

The real was the currency of Argentina until 1881. From 1822, it was subdivided into 10 décimos. The sol was also issued during this period and was equal to the real, whilst the peso was worth 8 reales and the escudo was worth 16 reales.

== History ==
Spanish colonial reales circulated alone until 1813, when Argentina began issuing its own coins. From 1820, paper money was also issued. In 1826, the peso moneda corriente and peso fuerte were introduced in paper money only. In 1854, coins were issued denominated in centavos. However, decimalization did not occur until in 1881, when the real was replaced by the peso moneda nacional at a rate of 8 reales to 1 peso.

== Coins ==
Early Argentine real (escudo)
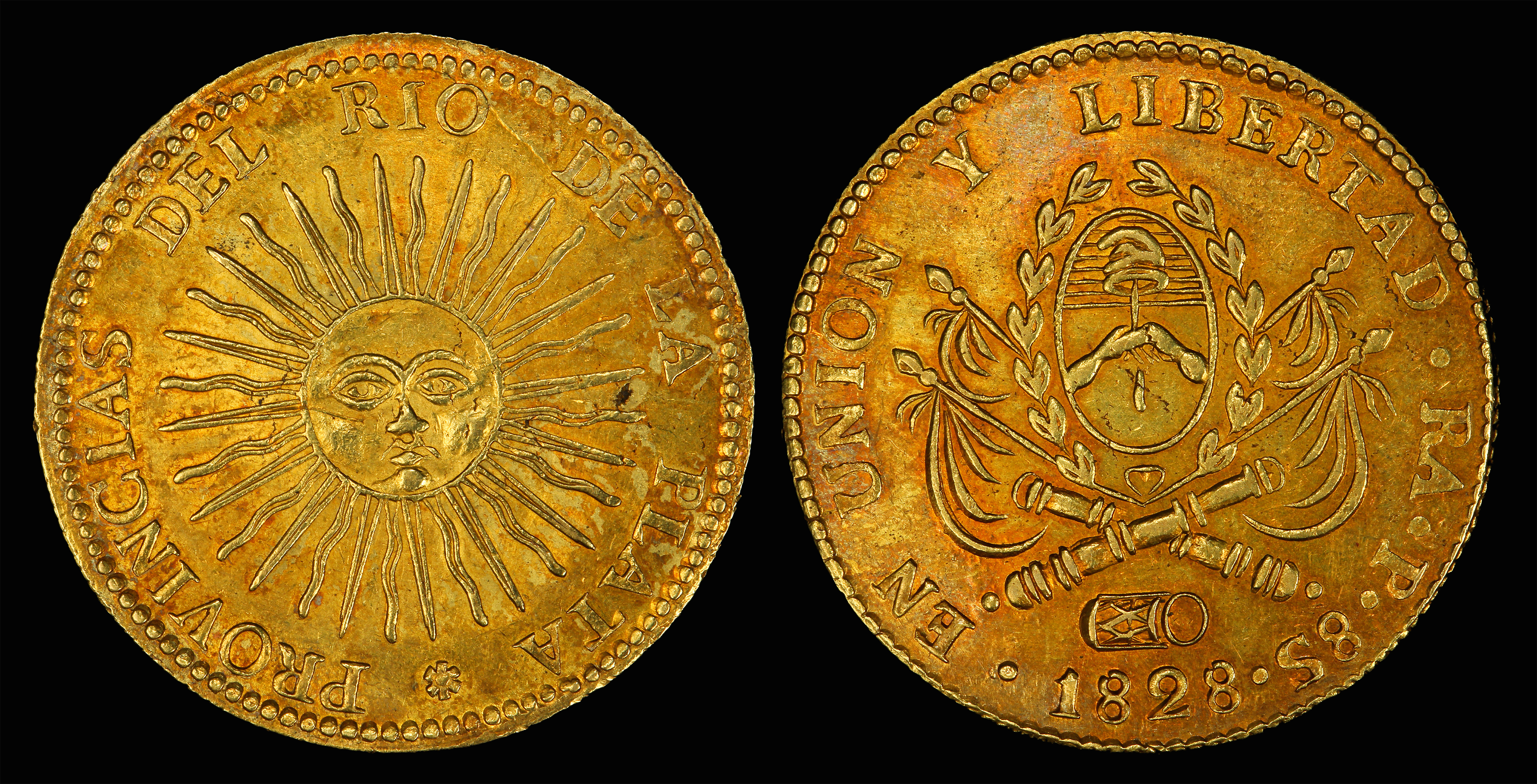
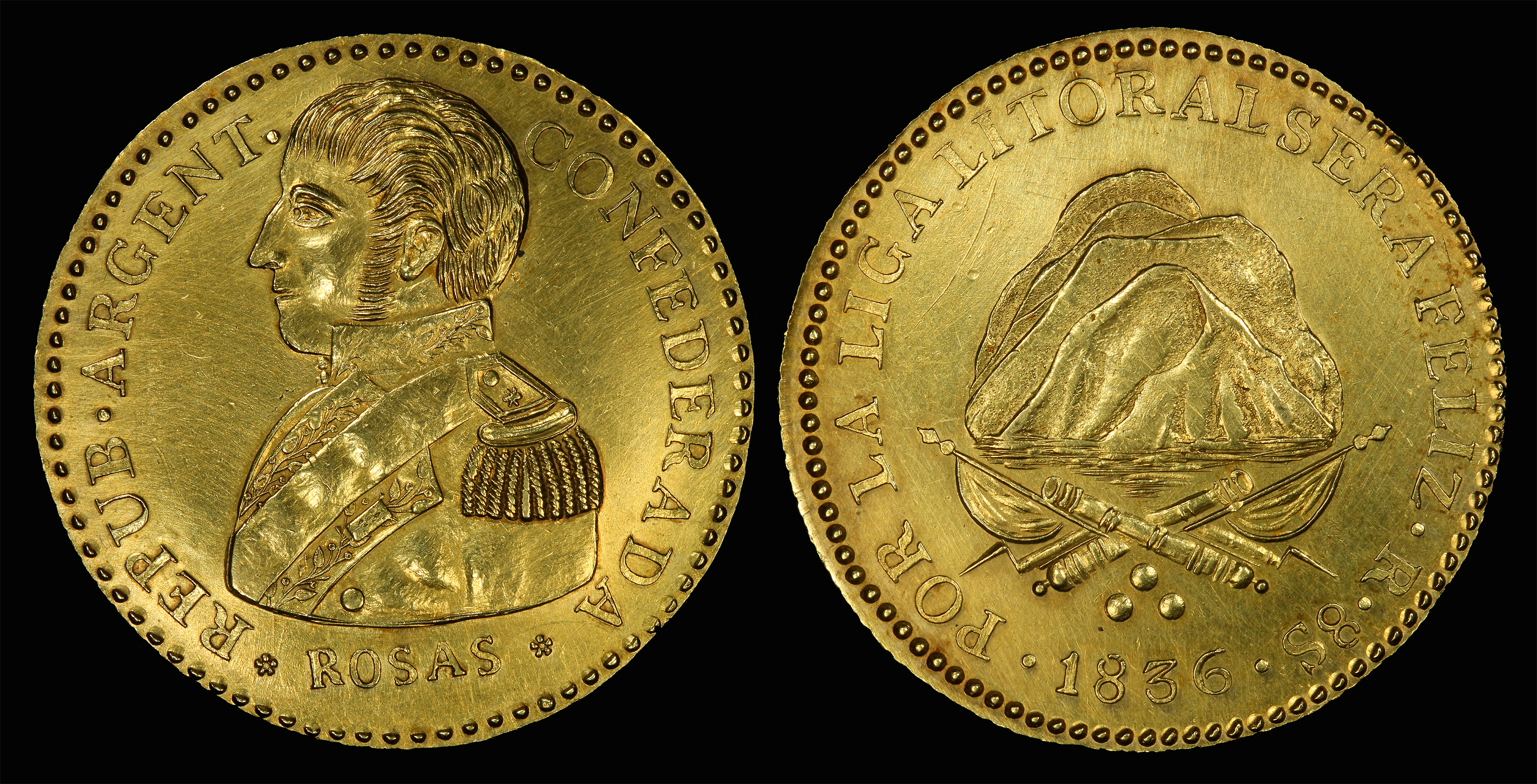
Two 8 escudo gold coins from the United Provinces of the River Plate, 1828 (top) and Argentine Confederation, 1836 (bottom)

Silver coins were issued in the name of the "Río de la Plata Province" in denominations of 1/2, 1, 2, 4 and 8 reales and 1/2, 1, 2, 4 and 8 soles, whilst gold coins (87.5%) were issued in denomination of 1, 2, 4 and 8 escudos.

The state of Buenos Aires issued its own coins starting in 1822, denominated in reales and décimos, with 10 décimos = 1 real. Coins were issued in denominations of 1, 5, 10 and 20 décimos, together with 1/4, 1/2 (actually shown as 5/10), 1 and 2 reales. They were all minted of copper. Other provinces issued coins denominated in reales (silver) and escudos (gold): Córdoba, Entre Ríos, La Rioja, Mendoza, Salta, Santiago del Estero and Tucumán. Since these coins were scarce, it was common to use silver coins from other countries (especially Bolivian soles).

In 1854, coins were issued in the name of the "Argentine Confederation" in denominations of 1, 2 and 4 centavo coins. As notes above, this issue did not lead to full decimalization.

== Banknotes ==
In 1820, the Government of the Province of Buenos Aires introduced notes in denominations of 5, 10, 20, 40, 50 and 100 pesos. These were followed in 1823 by 1, 3 and 5 pesos. The Banco de Buenos Ayres began issuing notes in 1822 in denominations of 20, 50, 100, 200, 500 and 1000 pesos. 1 and 2 peso notes followed in 1823.

== General references ==
- Krause, Chester L.; Clifford Mishler (1996). Standard Catalog of World Coins: 1801–1900. Colin R. Bruce II and Marian S. Moe (editors) (1st ed.). Krause Publications. ISBN 0873414276.
- Pick, Albert (1990). Bruce, Colin R. II; Shafer, Neil (eds.). Standard Catalog of World Paper Money: Specialized Issues (6th ed.). Krause Publications. ISBN 0-87341-149-8.
