= Sol (laptop) =

SOL Laptop
- Developer: WeWi Telecommunications, Inc.
- Type: Laptop computer
- Released: TBD
- Operating system: Ubuntu
- Website: solaptop.com

The SOL is a rugged, waterproof solar-powered laptop computer intended for use in African schools that do not have access to an electrical network. Sol was created by London, Ontario-based WeWi Telecommunications.

== Design and features ==
The SOL is available in two editions, a standard edition and the Marine edition which uses hydrophobic coating to provide water repletion instead of waterproofing the laptop. The laptop has a reinforced polymer-based clam shell casing that houses the solar panels and makes the laptop more durable. The device uses four detachable monocrystalline photovoltaic panels which fold into the unit.
