= El Sol (Santa Cruz) =

Bolivian newspaper

El Sol is a newspaper published in Santa Cruz de la Sierra, Bolivia. Its first issue was released on September 13, 2010, becoming the first daily newspaper circulating in the country, aimed largely at the 20-40 age demographic. The newspaper is owned by Editorial Día a Día SA (EDADSA). For its first anniversary in 2011, its staff went to the city center in a promotional action to deliver copies to readers.
