= El Sol (Stamford) =

EL SOL News
- Type: Weekly newspaper
- Founder: Arnulfo Arteaga
- Founded: 1982
- Language: Spanish
- Headquarters: Stamford, Connecticut
- Website: elsolnews.com

EL SOL News ("The Sun") is a weekly Spanish-language newspaper based in Stamford, Connecticut. Founded in 1982, it is the oldest newspaper in that language in that U.S. state, and the dominant Spanish-language newspaper in Connecticut, serving a growing Hispanic population. It serves both lower Fairfield County, Connecticut, and Westchester County, New York.

Founder Arnulfo Arteaga has said the newspaper aims to inform the Hispanic community about such issues as health, education, and immigration. The publication has two reporters, and most of the 52 pages in a normal edition are filled with wire stories. Several pages of each issue are devoted to news from Connecticut, New York and Latin America. The publication is written in Latin American Spanish and comes out on Fridays. The newspaper is supported by advertising revenue, and copies are free.

The family-run newspaper has a circulation of about 16,000 as of July 2008, when the newspaper's management said they wanted to increase circulation to 20,000 by the end of the year. As of 2005, the Hispanic population of stamford was 254,500, according to the American Community Survey; the city's total population in 2007 was 118,475.

The newspaper's longtime rival is La Voz Hispana, a weekly based in New Haven, Connecticut which opened a Stamford bureau in September 2006. New York City-based Spanish newspapers El Correo and Hoy also compete for readers. As of October 2007, the newspaper was also competing with the biweekly Enfoque Latino, started by William Cacerces, a former sales executive for El Sol and La Voz.

The newspaper is run by several of Arteaga's children (ages as of early October 2007): Alvaro, 42, managing editor; Raul, 32, press operator and layout designer; Arnulfo Jr., or Alex, 26, distribution supervisor; and Monica, 38, occasional contributing reporter.

== History ==
El Sol was founded in 1982 in Queens, New York, by Arnulfo Arteaga, a native of Colombia, originally with a circulation of only 300 copies, which he distributed from a shopping cart he found in a Dumpster. Arteaga already had 20 years of experience in journalism before he immigrated to the United States in 1980. In New York City, he freelanced for El Diario and La Prensa, but couldn't get a permanent job with either because he didn't speak English well enough.

The newspaper began circulating in Fairfield County, Connecticut, in 1995, and in 2002 moved its news operation to Stamford. At that time, circulation was at 10,000 copies. By 1997, the paper increased its frequency, becoming a weekly, and in 2001 it launched its Web site.

In September 2007, the newspaper celebrated its 25th anniversary with a gala at the Italian Center of Stamford. By October of that year, Arteaga, then 65, had recently retired as director of the newspaper.
