= Brendan Angelides =

American music producer

- Also known as: Eskmo, Welder
- Born: Brendan Angelides; Massachusetts, U.S.
- Origin: California, U.S.
- Genre: Electronic
- Occupations: Producer, composer
- Years active: 1999–present
- Labels: Interscope Ninja Tune, Planet Mu, Warp, Milan, Ancestor, Apollo
- Website: www.ancestormedia.com

Brendan Angelides, formerly known by his stage names Eskmo and Welder, is an American electronic music producer and composer. He has released music on the record labels Interscope, Ninja Tune, Planet Mu, and Warp Records. NPR's Bob Boilen described him as "part musician, part magician". to introduce his 2015 Tiny Desk Performance.

Angelides has composed scores for film, television, and videogames. In 2024, he was nominated for a BAFTA Award for his score on Ubisoft's Assassin's Creed Mirage. Television series include the entire seven seasons of Showtime's Billions, Showtime's Superpumped, Netflix's 13 Reasons Why and Netflix's Echoes. Most recently, Angelides co-composed the score for Darren Aronofsky's Postcard From Earth, alongside his collaborators in the Echo Society, which is showing for two years at the Las Vegas Sphere.

== Career ==
=== Albums ===
Angelides' self-titled album, Eskmo, was released on Ninja Tune in 2010. BBC Music said of the album "..Sufficient mind-melting invention here – prior reference points or otherwise – to render Eskmo a hotter property than that chilly moniker might immediately imply." He released the Language and "Terra" EPs on Ancestor in 2012 and 2013 respectively.

In 2015, his follow up album SOL, a concept album about the Sun, was released on Apollo / R&S records. It featured the artwork of UK feather sculpture artist Kate MccGwire.

In April 2017, Interscope released the original score album written by Angelides for the Netflix series 13 Reasons Why. Alongside the score, it featured a cover song of Yazoo's "Only You" produced by Angelides for Selena Gomez. Earlier in 2017, Milan Records released the original score for the Showtime series Billions.

In 2023, Angelides released Oxygen on his own imprint Ancestor, intertwining his signature electronic palette with an array of orchestral incantations performed by the London Contemporary Orchestra.

=== Film / TV / video games ===
Angelides is the composer for all four seasons of Netflix's original series 13 Reasons Why and all seven seasons of Showtime's TV series Billions. In 2020, he scored the feature film Naked Singularity and the VR experience Minimum Mass, followed by Super Pumped: The Battle For Uber (Showtime) and Echoes (Netflix) in 2022.

In 2023, he composed the soundtrack for Assassin's Creed Mirage, working with the New York Arabic Orchestra, Layth Siddiq and Akram Haddad. He was nominated for a BAFTA for his work.

Angelides also composed music for Darren Aronofsky's Postcard from Earth film alongside the Echo Society, which was premiered at the Sphere in Las Vegas.

=== Social outreach ===
In September 2015, Angelides announced a project entitled FeelHarmonic. Its role being: "FeelHarmonic connects creatives, from a variety of fields, to collaborate on bringing the deaf community new ways to experience sound. It is the first community-based outreach program being launched under The Echo Society umbrella."

=== The Echo Society ===
In December 2013, Angelides helped create a Los Angeles–based collective called The Echo Society. Made up of composers, visual designers and engineers, the group has put on multiple events in various locations throughout Los Angeles featuring large orchestral ensembles mixed with electronic music. Other notable composers involved are Joseph Trapanese, Rob Simonsen, Jeremy Zuckerman, Benjamin Wynn, Nathan Johnson, and Judson Crane.

== Discography ==
=== Albums ===
- Machines on Task (1999, self-released)
- Illuminate (2001, self-released)
- Ascension (2003, self-released)
- Vines and Streams (2006, Cyberset) (as Welder)
- Eskmo (2010, Ninja Tune)
- Florescence (2011, Ancestor) (as Welder)
- SOL (2015, Apollo)
- Billions OST (2017, Milan)
- 13 Reasons Why OST (2017, Interscope)
- Motions Like These (2019, Ancestor) (with Kira Kira)
- Naked Singularity (Original Motion Picture Soundtrack) (2021, Lakeshore)
- Super Pumped: The Battle For Uber (Music from the Showtime Original Series) (2022, Showtime Networks / Milan)
- Echoes (Soundtrack from the Netflix Series) (2022, Netflix Music)
- Oxygen (2023, Ancestor)
- Assassin's Creed Mirage (Original Game Soundtrack) (2023, Ubisoft Music)

=== EPs ===
- Bamboo Snow (2007) as Welder
- The Willow Grail (2008)
- Chalice Well (2008) as Welder
- Purple & Orange (The Remixes) (2008) (as Welder)
- Cloudlight / Come Back (2010)
- We Got More / Moving Glowstream (2011)
- Language (2012)
- Terra (2013)

=== Singles ===
- "Cower / Lord of Life" (2002)
- "Blue Tundra / Atlantis" (2003)
- "Time to React / Basement" (2004) (with Backdraft)
- "Cliffside / Embryonic" (2005)
- "Only a Few / Forces of Spirit" (2005)
- "No Man's Land / Waterfight" (2006) (with 30Hz)
- "Speakers Corner" (2007) (with Quest)
- "Jetski" (2007)
- "Speaking in Tongues" (2007)
- "Hypercolor" (2009)
- "Agnus Dei" (2009)
- "Let Them Sing" (2009)
- "Land and Bones" (2010)
- "Aether" (from The Echo Society: Vol. 1) (2020)
- "Into the Light" (From the Assassin's Creed Mirage Cinematic World Premiere) (2022)
- "Assassin's Creed Mirage Official Soundtrack" (2023)

=== Productions ===
- Bar 9 – "Murda Sound (Eskmo Remix)" (2008)
- Bibio – "Dwrcan (Eskmo Remix)" from The Apple and the Tooth (2009)
- Spor – "Knock You Down (Eskmo Remix)" (2010)
- Amon Tobin – "Ruthless Reprise (Eskmo Remix)" from Chaos Theory Remixed: The Soundtrack to Splinter Cell 3D (2011)
- Hundred Waters – "Boreal (Eskmo Remix)" (2013)
