= Casa de Tucumán =

Coordinates: 26°50′00″S 65°12′14″W

Historical House of Independence
- Casa histórica de la independencia
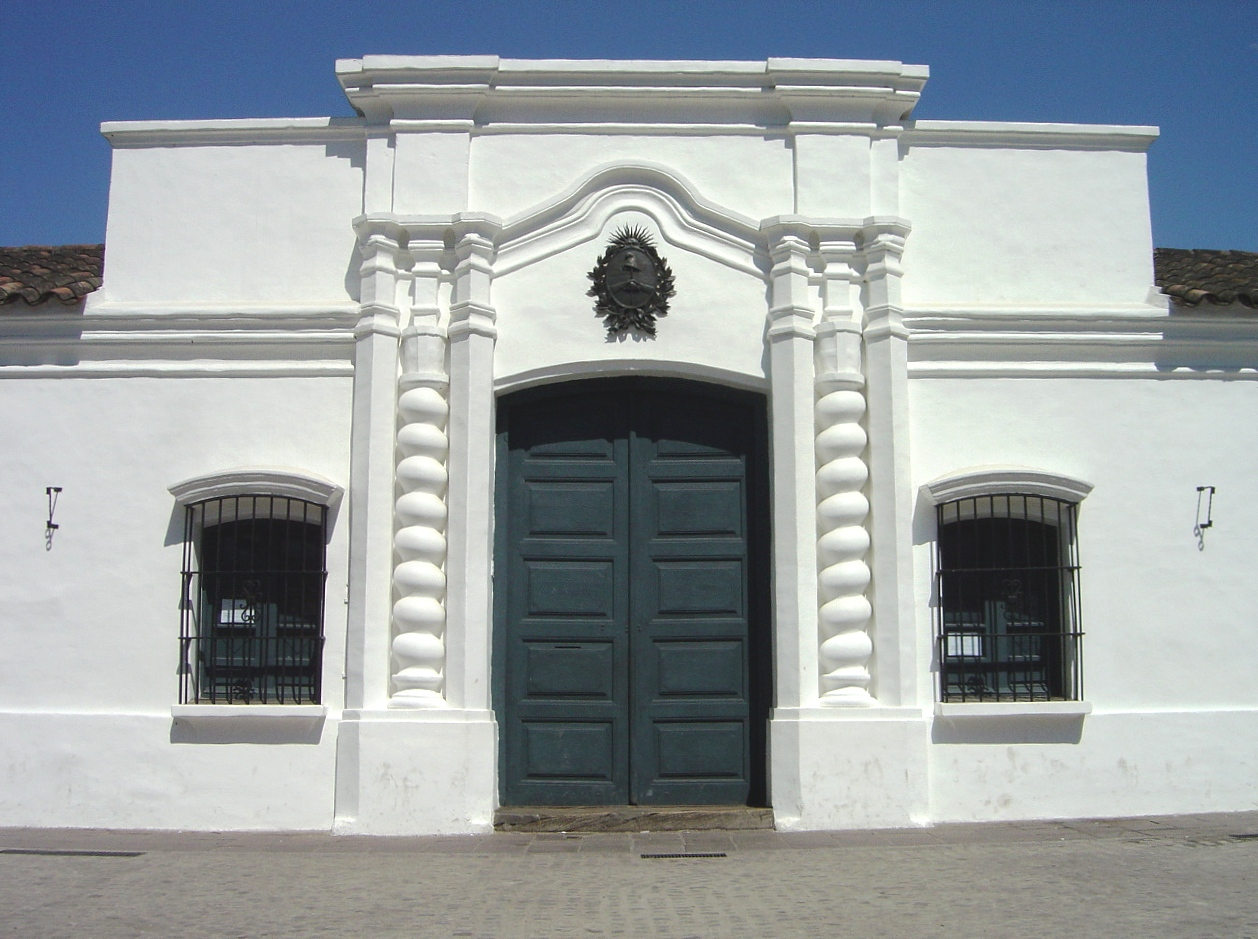
- Casa Histórica de Tucumán, site of the Argentine declaration of independence
- Interactive map of the Historical House of Independence area

General information
- Location: San Miguel de Tucumán, Argentina

Website
- casadelaindependencia.cultura.gob.ar

National Historic Monument of Argentina

The Historical House of Tucumán (Spanish: Casa Histórica de Tucumán, officially "Casa Histórica de la Independencia") is a historic building and museum located in San Miguel de Tucumán, Argentina, built during the colonial times. The Congress of Tucumán worked in this house during the Argentine War of Independence, and issued the Argentine Declaration of Independence on July 9, 1816. It was nationalized decades later, and partially demolished for its poor condition. It was declared a National Historic Monument of Argentina in 1941, and reconstructed, with simplified details, in its original layout.

== History ==
The city of San Miguel de Tucumán was first founded in Ibatín in 1565. For strategic reasons, it was left and founded again in its current location in 1685. In the Spanish Colonial architecture there was a main plaza surrounded by the most important buildings, and the city was organized in a grid of squares. Each square was divided in four parts, and each one was given to a vecino. The layout of the city founded in 1685 was the same than in the old city. The location of the Casa de Tucumán was owned by Diego Bazán y Figueroa. The actual house was built in 1760 by Francisca Bazán and Miguel Laguna.

The Argentine War of Independence began in 1810, and the battle of Tucumán was fought in September 24, 1812, outside the city. The Laguna-Bazán family was not living in the house at the time, which was used as a barracks for the troops of the Army of the North. The government established the customs and the Regimental depot in 1815, paying a fee to the owners of the house for it. The Congress of Tucumán, with representatives of most provinces of the United Provinces of the Río de la Plata, began to work in 1816. Family tradition maintained that the Laguna Bazán donated the house to the state for the Congress and that other families and religious orders donated furniture for it, but historian Ramón Leoni Pinto proved in 1974 that the house was rented to the state and that the furniture was built by slaves for the event. The Congress began to work on March 1, 1816, and issued the Argentine Declaration of Independence on July 9. The Congress continued its work up to February 1817, when it was moved to Buenos Aires.

With the Congress gone, the house was still rented by the state, for a printing house. The family returned to it shortly afterwards, and reduced the renting to only the two front rooms. Carmen de Zabalía, granddaughter of Francisca Bazán and Nicolás Laguna, inherited the house in 1839 and began works to restore it. The humid climate of Tucumán and the materials used to build it caused a fast deterioration, and the family did not have the money to properly maintain it. The house was very deteriorated in 1869 when Ángel Paganelli took the first known photo of it. He took a photo of the front door, and another of the internal patio with the "blind Zabalía", the blind daughters of Carmen.

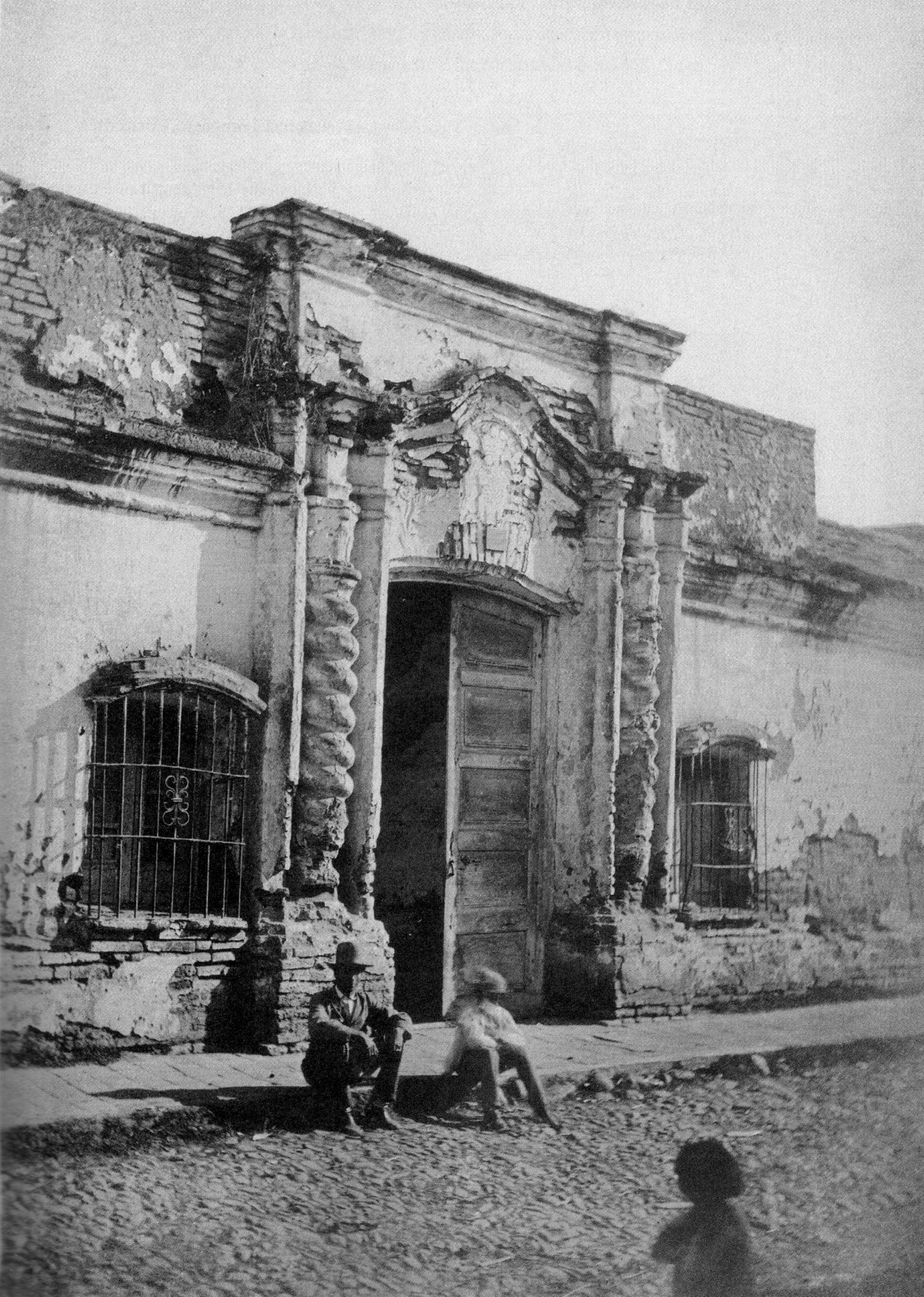
First known photo of the Casa de Tucumán, taken by Ángel Paganelli in 1869

The Argentine National Congress sanctioned a law in 1869 (during the presidency of Domingo Faustino Sarmiento) that authorized the state to nationalize the house and organize the maintenance. The nationalization was a slow process, achieved in 1874 by president Nicolás Avellaneda, native of Tucumán. The office of national engineers was tasked with the maintenance, and kept the "hall of the oath" (the hall of the declaration of independence), demolishing the rest of the building and establishing a new one for the mailing service of the city. President Julio Argentino Roca, native of Tucumán, authorized a project to demolish the outer building and enclose the hall into a structure that would protect it from the climate. The hall was accessed from an atrium with two bas-reliefs at the sides made by Lola Mora, one about the declaration of independence and another about the May Revolution (the event that began the war of independence). The hall became as well the location of annual celebrations of the anniversary of the declaration of independence each July 9, which had been irregularly celebrated since 1817.

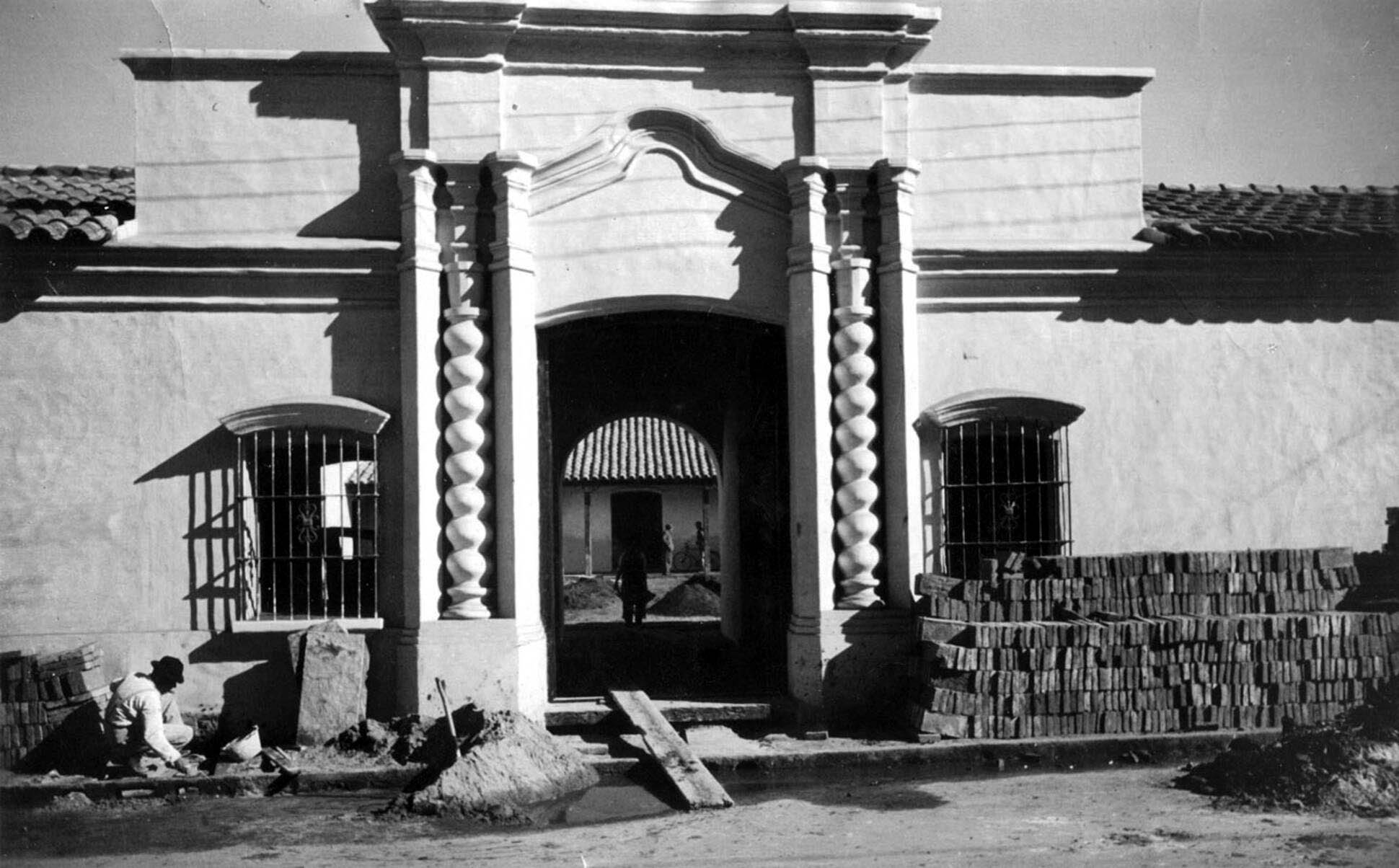
Reconstruction of the historical house in the 1940s

The Casa de Tucumán was declared a National Historic Monument of Argentina in 1941. The national representative for Tucumán Ramón Paz Posse sent a bill to the Congress proposing the reconstruction of the House in its original form. The work was made from the photos by Paganelli, the archives of the 1870 administration and the foundations that were still underground. The works began in 1942, and the restored building was open on September 24, 1943 (anniversary of the battle of Tucumán). The new walls were made with bricks instead of adobe, the reeds of the roof were tied with leather, and the doors were not painted at the moment for the lack of documentary evidence of their original color.

President Juan Domingo Perón declared the economic independence of the country in the house on July 9, 1947, after the complete payment of Argentina's external debt. The subversive organization Montoneros invaded the house on February 15, 1971, and painted slogans in the main hall. They overpowered the single policeman who was at the site, and the province reacted sending 2,500 armed policemen to the site.

== Events ==
The city of San Miguel de Tucumán is appointed capital city of Argentina for each July 9 since 1992. The annual celebration of the declaration of independence is attended by the president of Argentina, the governor of Tucumán province, their cabinets and special guests.

The Casa de Tucumán is now a museum. A son et lumière show takes place at the House each evening to set the scene for the story of the declaration of independence. The show ends with the national anthem in front of the Argentine flag, flanked on either side by large reliefs of the historic scenes sculpted by Lola Mora.

The bicentennial of the declaration of independence was held in 2016. Américo Castilla, secretary of cultural heritage of the nation, announced projects to redesign the museum.

== Gallery ==
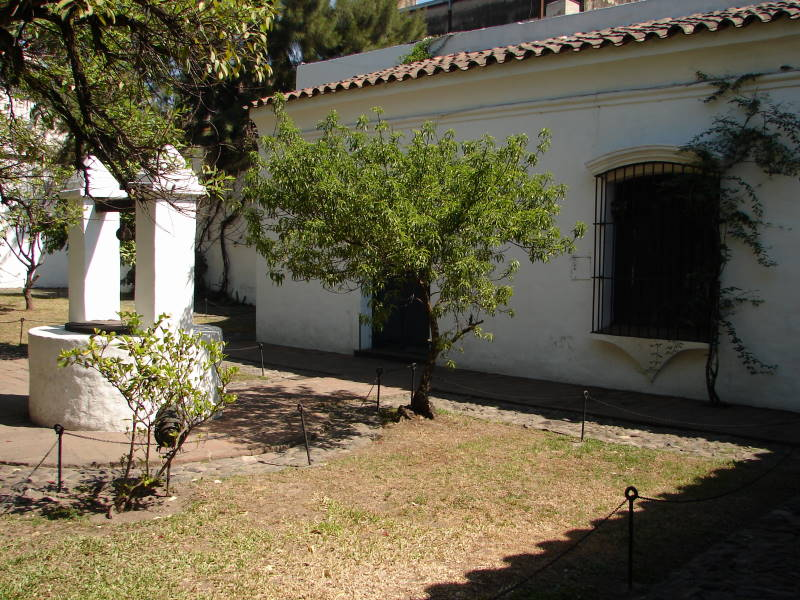
Aljibe

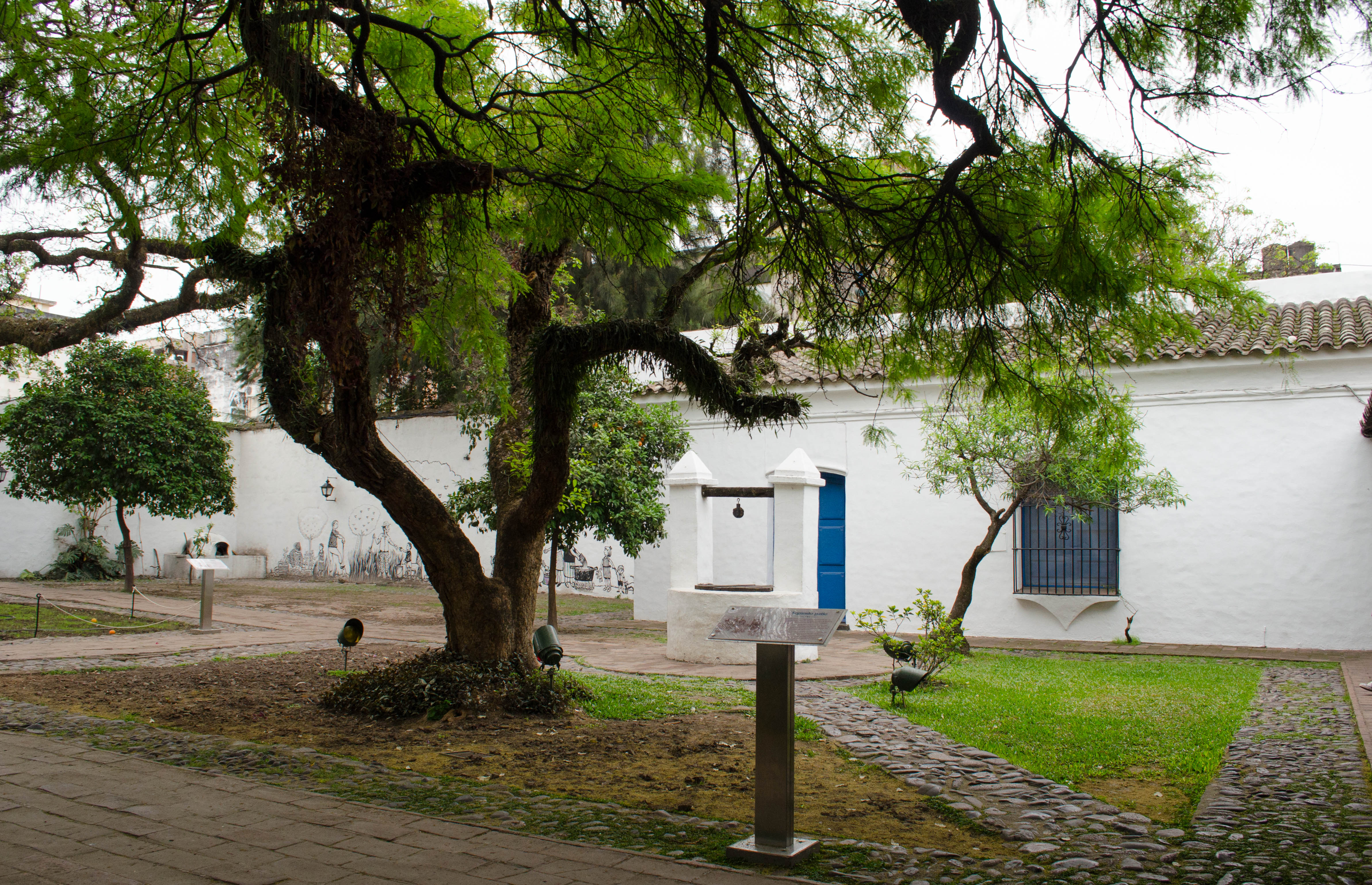
Gardens

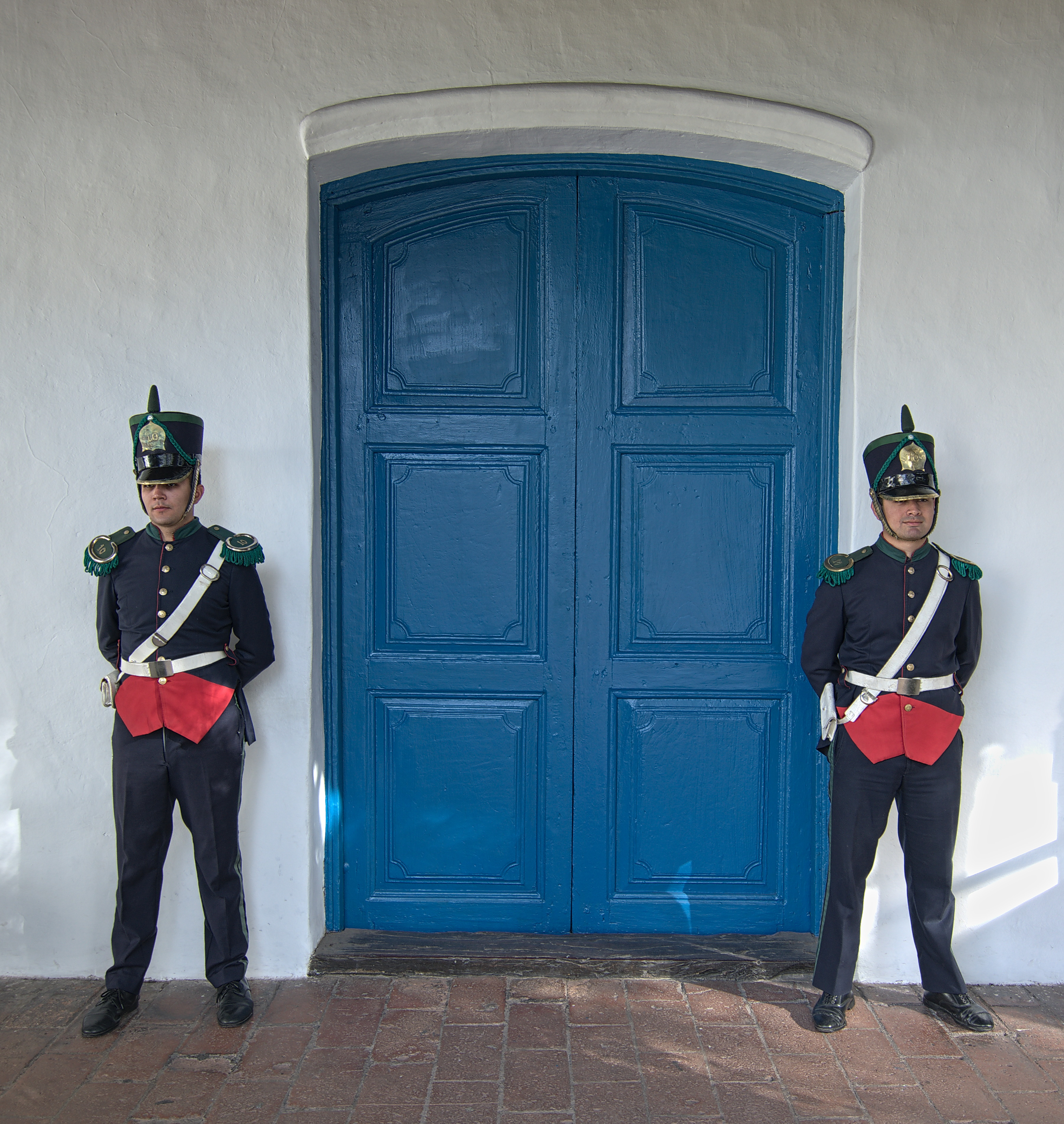
Guards

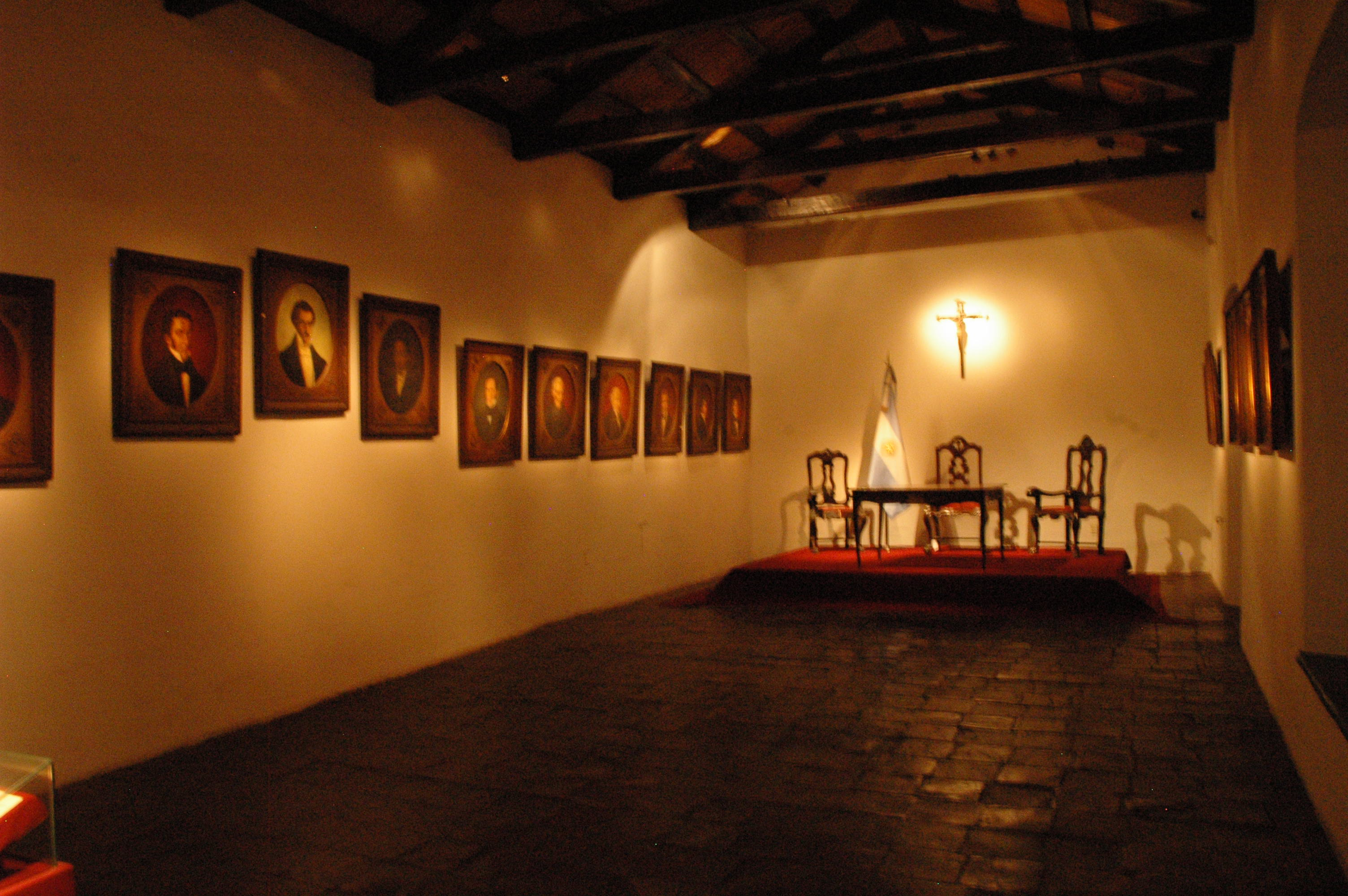
Hall of the Argentine Declaration of Independence

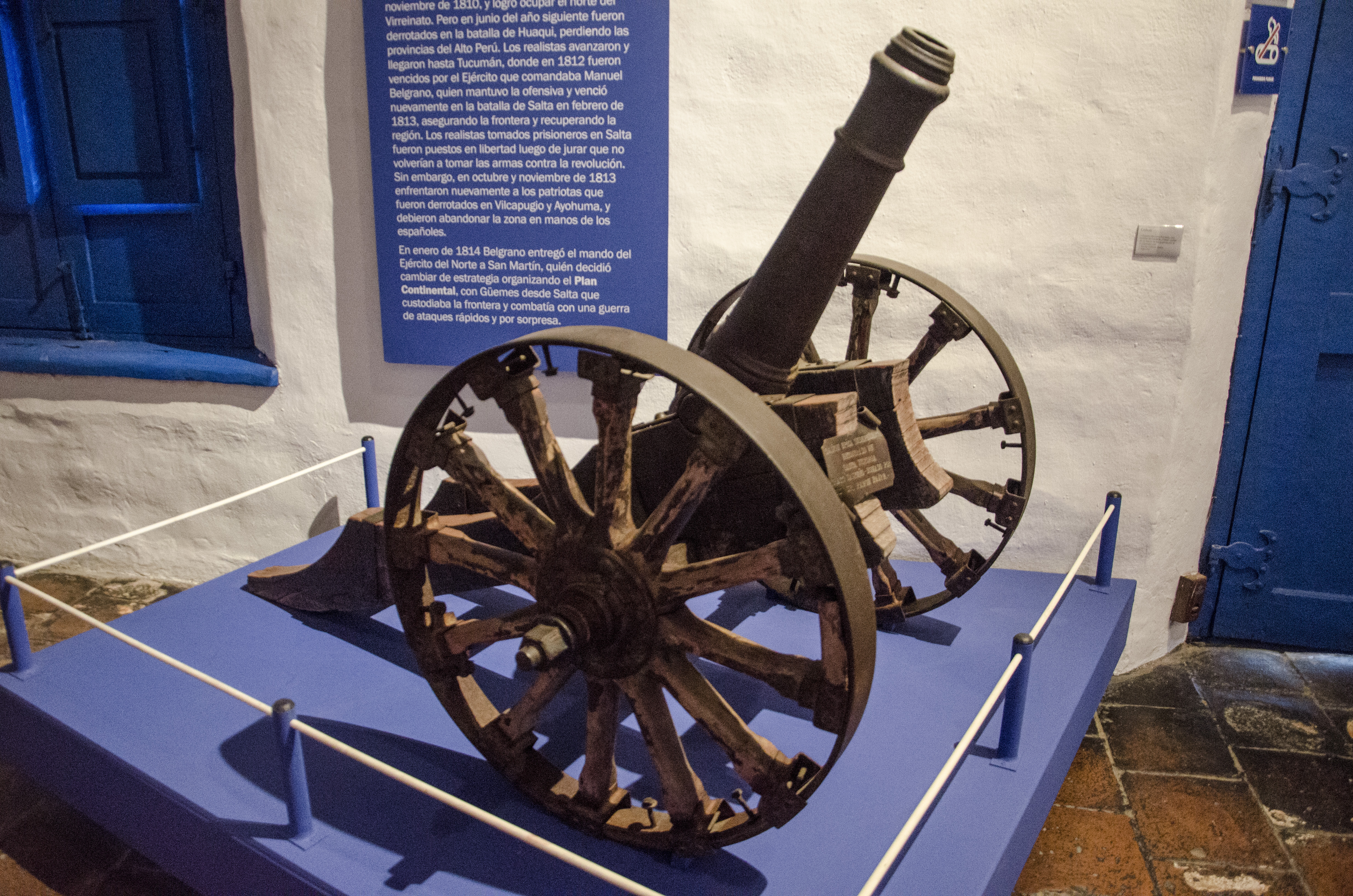
Cannon

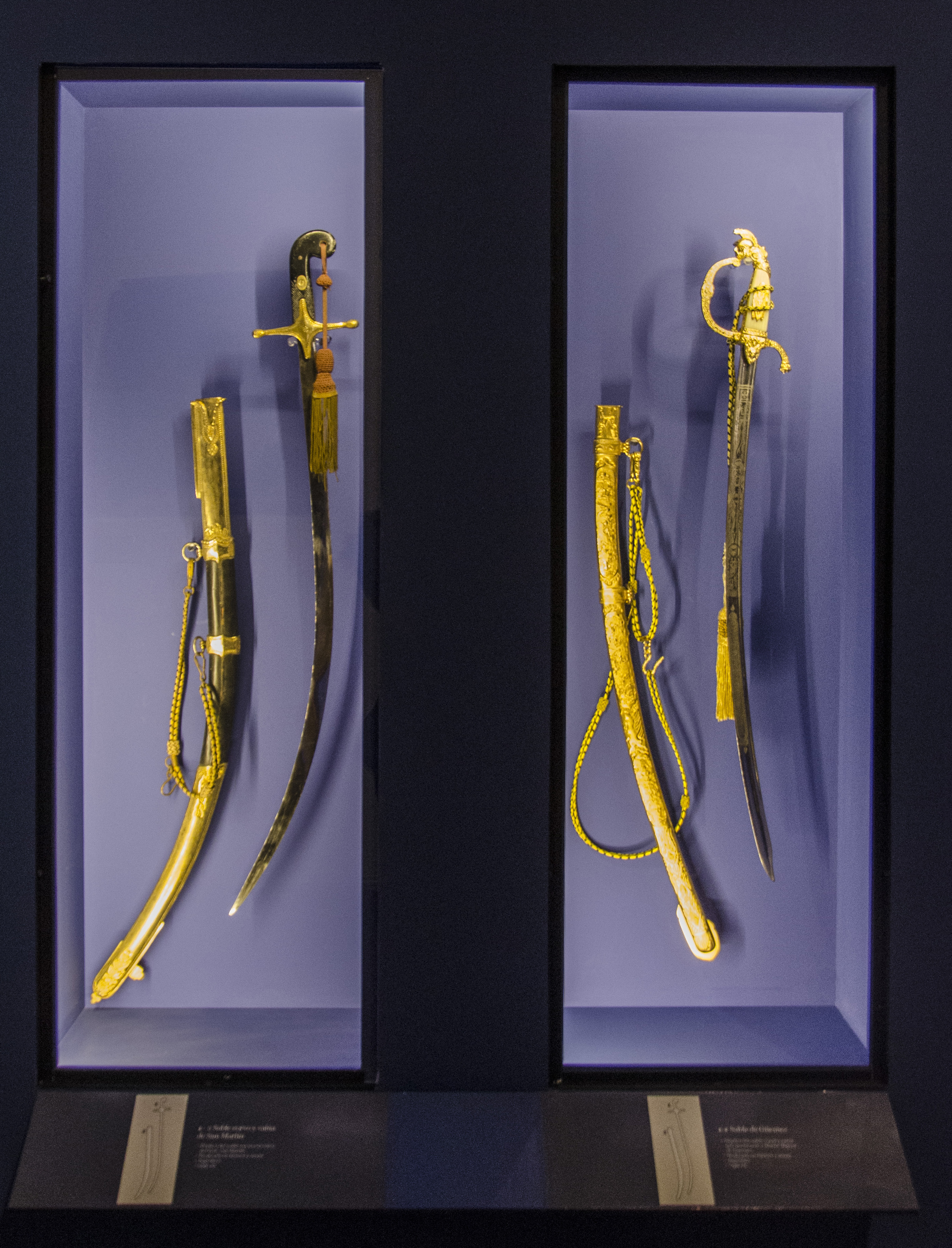
Sabres

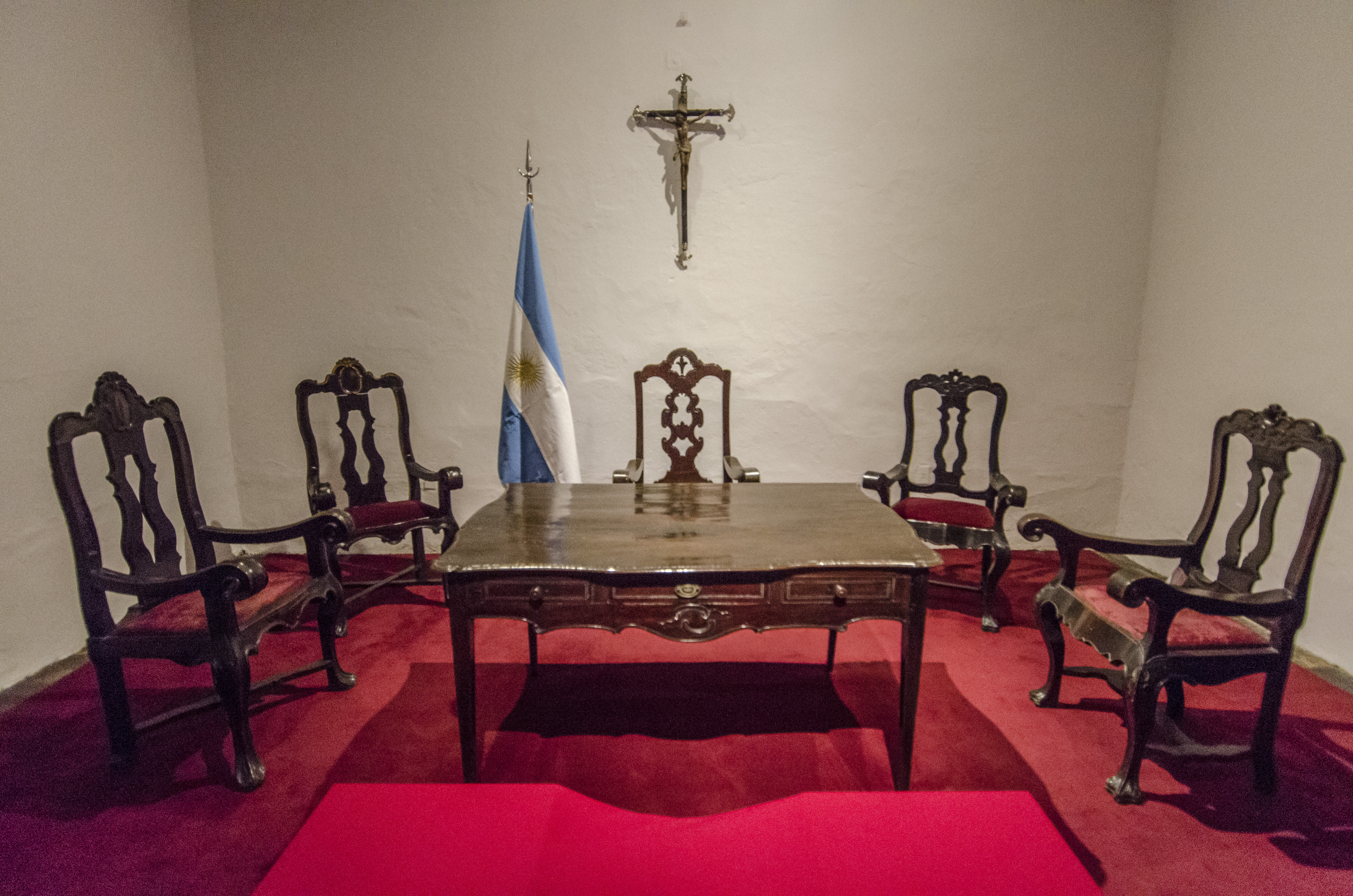
Meeting room

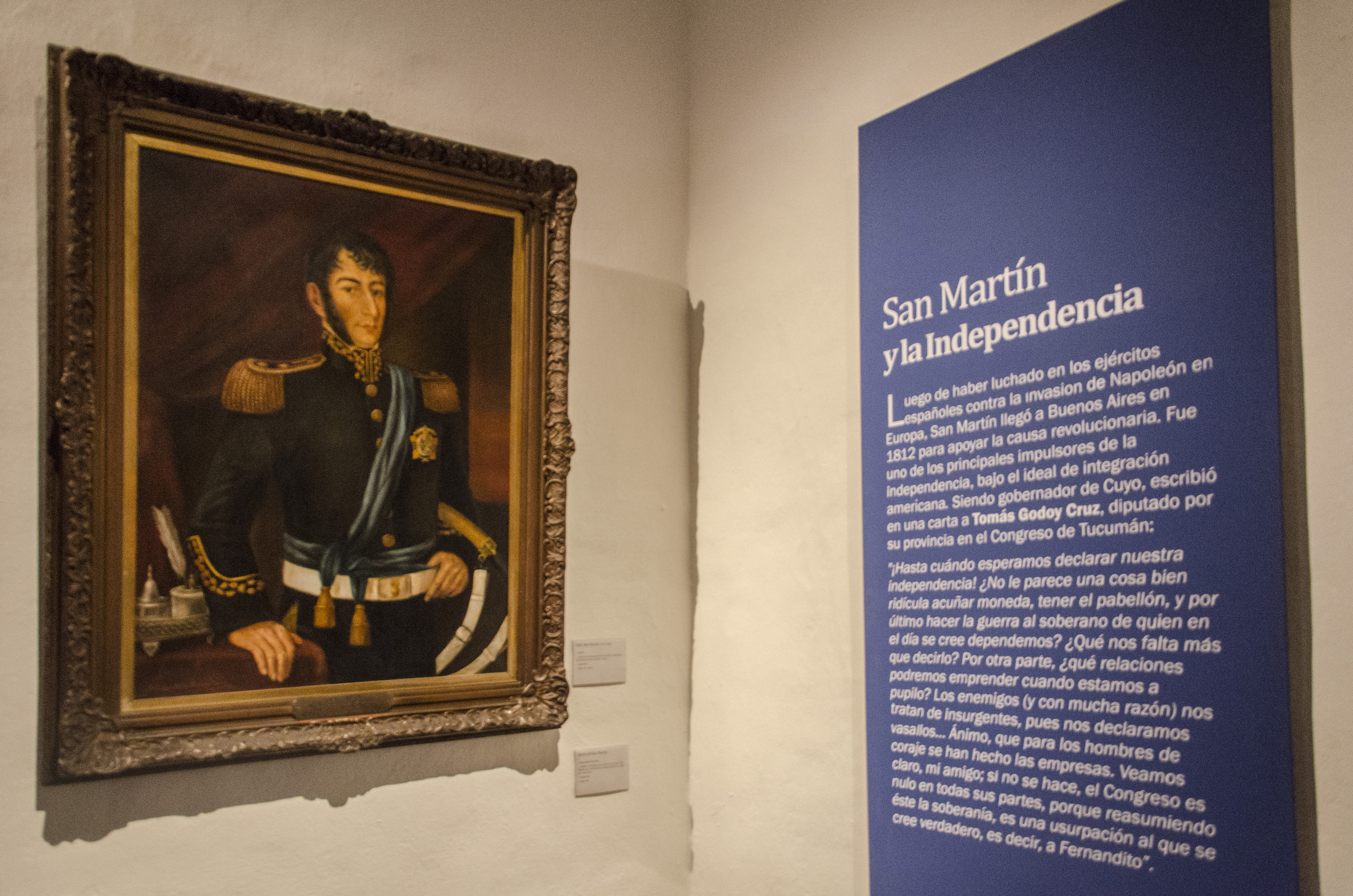
Portrait of José de San Martín

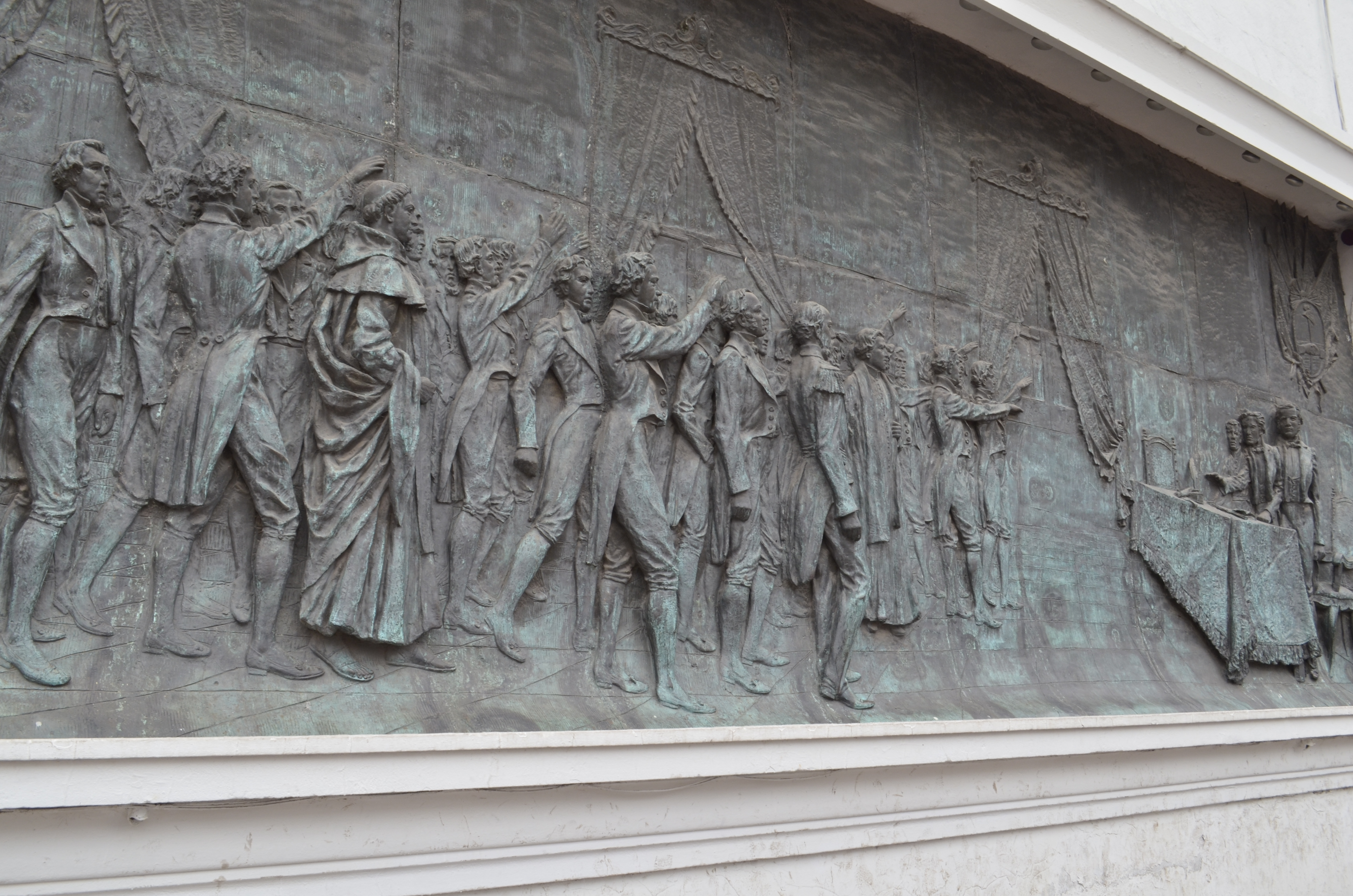
Sculptures by Lola Mora

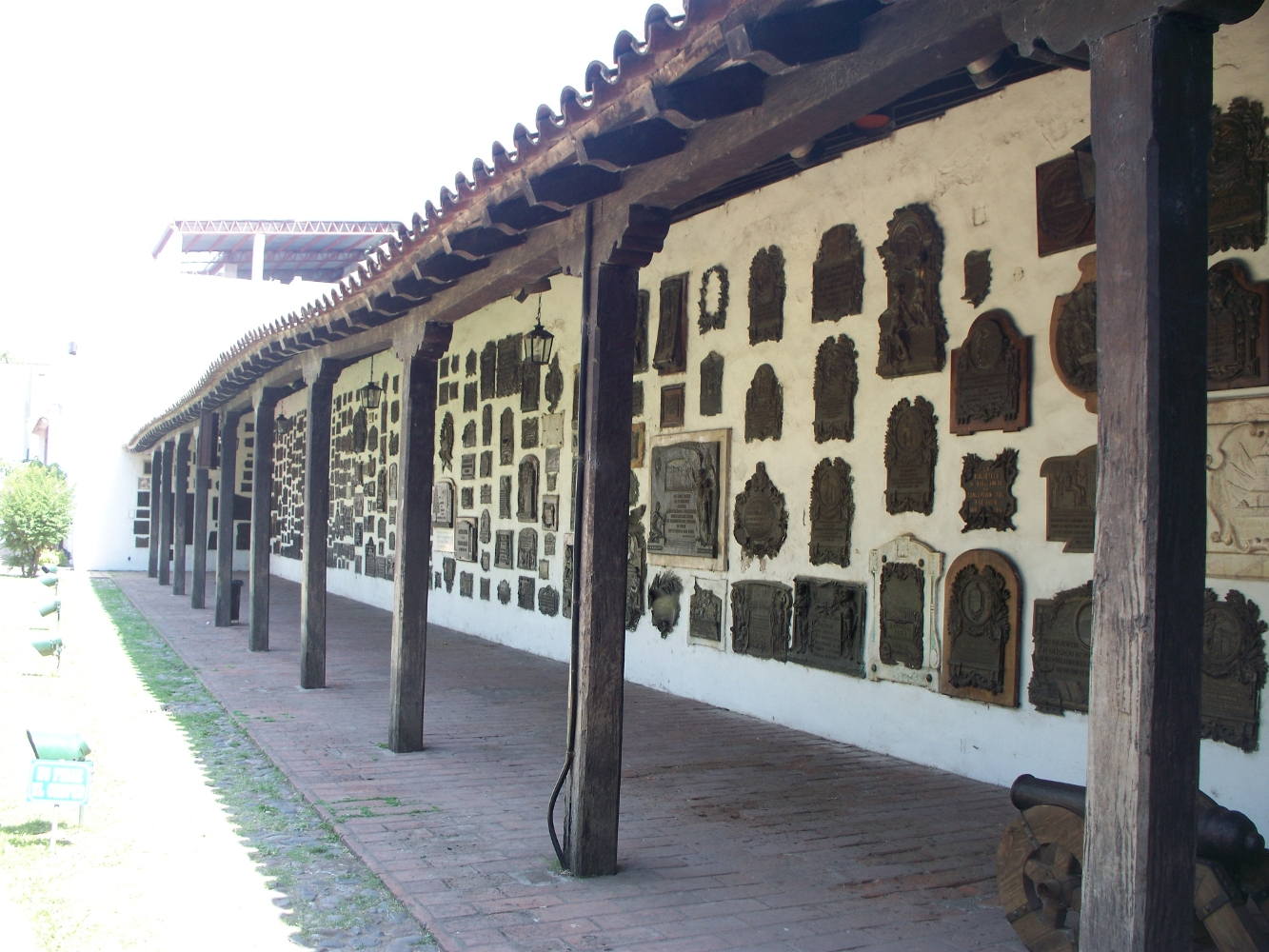
Plaques and memorials

== Bibliography ==
- Marinsalda, Juan Carlos (2012). La Casa - La Historia. San Miguel de Tucumán: Asociación de amigos del museo Casa Histórica de la Independencia.
