= Far-right terrorism in Spain =

Terrorism motivated by far-right politics in Spain

Far-right terrorism in Spain (Spanish: Terrorismo de extrema derecha) surged after the death of dictator Francisco Franco in 1975 and continued until the early 1980s. The term (Spanish: terrorismo tardofranquista, lit. late Francoist terrorism) refers to the actions undertaken by fascist and far-right groups who were against the changes taking place during the transition to democracy, and essentially dedicated to street violence against persons of other ideologies.

As a result of their actions, between 66, 77 and 95 people died. Their actions ranged from assassination of individuals to mass murder, and were centered against leftists, although they also murdered citizens with no relation to politics. They used various names, such as Batallón Vasco Español (Basque Spanish Battalion), Guerrilleros de Cristo Rey (Warriors of Christ the King) and Alianza Apostólica Anticomunista (Apostolic Anticommunist Alliance)—abbreviated Triple A or AAA—although it has been commonly stated that there were only a few terrorism networks and they created different names as needed.

== History ==
In parallel with the declaration of state of exception in Vizcaya and Gipuzkoa in April 1975, the first attacks were made against goods and persons related with ETA and their support networks, mainly in the French Basque Country, but also in Spanish territory. The bomb attack against the Mugalde library of Hendaye of 7 April 1975 is considered to be the first armed action of the Spanish neofascist terrorism. On July 12, 1975 these groups publicly presented their first name: ATE (Anti Terrorismo ETA, "Anti-Terrorism of ETA"), when claiming the attacks in the previous months in the media. At this time, these groups had not yet perpetrated acts which resulted in fatalities.

== Chronology of deadly actions attributed to far-right groups ==
- October 5, 1975: The businessman Ignacio Echave Orobengoa is murdered.
- October 12, 1975: Germán Aguirre Irasuegui is murdered.
- May 9, 1976: Montejurra Incidents. Two carlists are murdered.
- July 9, 1976: María Norma Menchaca Gonzalo is murdered by Guerrilleros de Cristo Rey. Two other persons suffer serious injuries.
- September 26, 1976: Carlos González Martínez during a demonstration murdered by Guerrilleros de Cristo Rey.
- January 23, 1977: The student Arturo Ruiz García is murdered during a demonstration.
- January 24, 1977: The Atocha massacre, killing five and injuring four people, all of them lawyers or members of a labor union affiliated to the Communist Party.
- September 20, 1977: A bomb attributed to the Triple A group explodes in the office of the magazine El Papus in Barcelona. The doorman Juan Peñalver Sandoval dies, and 17 people are injured.
- October 7, 1977: Murder of the taxi driver David Salvador Bernardo (Jonio) in Gipuzkoa. Claimed by the Triple A group, accusing the driver of collaborating with ETA.
- May 24, 1978: Murder of taxi driver José Martín Merquelanz Sarriegui.
- July 2, 1978: Murder of Rosario Arregui Letamendi by Triple A.
- October 30, 1978: Three employees of El País are injured, two very seriously, with a letter bomb. The doorman Andrés Fraguas dies two days later.
- December 21, 1978: Murder of José Miguel Beñaran Ordeñana.
- May 6, 1979: Murder of José Ramón Ansa Echevarria.
- May 12, 1979: Murder of Francisco Javier Larrañaga Juaristi.
- June 25, 1979: Murder of Enrique Gómez "Korta" Álvarez, attributed to BVE.
- June 28, 1979: Murder of Francisco Javier Martín Eizaguirre.
- June 29, 1979: Murder of Aurelio Fernández Cario.
- August 3, 1979: Murder of Juan José Lopategui "Pantu" Carrasco, claimed by BVE.
- September 13, 1979: Murder of José Luis Alcazo, with baseball bats, for "having long hair" and "wearing jeans", by persons linked to Fuerza Nueva.
- September 20, 1979: Murder of Pierre Goldman.
- September 28, 1979: Murder of Tomás Alba Irazusta, claimed by the BVE.
- October 5, 1979: Justo Elizarán "Periko" Sarasola dies, after having been shot.
- January 9, 1980: Ana Teresa Barrueta Álvarez, a 19-year-old woman, is raped, tortured, and murdered. One of the investigators of the assault was threatened with graffiti signed by Fuerza Nueva: "Marxist, pig, we are going to rape you."
- January 15, 1980: Murder of Carlos Saldise Corta, attributed to GAE.
- January 20, 1980: Murder of Liborio Arana Gómez, Pacífico Fika Zuloaga, María Paz Armiño, and Manuel Santacoloma Velasco. Claimed by GAE.
- February 1, 1980: Murder of Yolanda González Martín.
- February 2, 1980: Murder of Jesús Maria Zubikaray Badiola, attributed to BVE.
- April 19, 1980: Murder of Felipe Sagarna Ormazábal, claimed by BVE.
- May 1, 1980: Murder of Arturo Pajuelo Rubio, attributed to Fuerza Nueva.
- May 6, 1980: Murder of Juan Carlos García Pérez, attributed to Fuerza Nueva.
- May 8, 1980: Rape and murder of María José Bravo del Barrio, claimed by BVE.
- June 11, 1980: José Miguel Etxeberria killed in Ziburu.
- July 23, 1980: A bombing at Bilbao killed instantly two Roma siblings: 17 year old María Contreras Gabarra and 11 year old Antonio Contreras Gabarra. Municipal employee Anastasio Leal Terradillos died of wounds a few hours later. Claimed by Triple A.
- July 25, 1980: Murder of Belén María Sánchez Ojeda, 16 years old.
- August 30, 1980: Murder of Angel Etxaniz Olabarría, attributed to BVE.
- September 7, 1980: Murder of Miguel Maria Arbelaiz and Luis Maria Elizondo, attributed to BVE.
- November 14, 1980: Murder of Esperanza Arana and Joaquín Alfonso Etxeberría, attributed to BVE. Murder of junkman Joaquín Antimasbere Escoz, with no known political links. Attributed to BVE.
- November 23, 1980: Deaths of José Camio and Jean Pierre Aramendi, with no known political links, ten people seriously injured. Attributed to BVE.
- December 30, 1980: Murder of José Martín Sagardía Zaldua, attributed to BVE.
- March 3, 1981: Murder of Francisco Javier Ansa Cincunegui, attributed to BVE.
- June 26, 1981: Murder of Antonio Murillo Chacón.
- January 2, 1982: Murder of Pablo Garayalde Jaureguizábal, claimed by Triple A.
- September 19, 2018: Man arrested for planning an assassination plot against Prime Minister Pedro Sánchez.
- April 2, 2021: Regional offices of the leftist Unidas Podemos party are firebombed in Cartagena, burning the exterior of the building. No one is hurt or killed.

== See also ==
- 23-F
- Armed far-right organizations in Italy
- Falangism
- Grupos Antiterroristas de Liberación
- History of the far-right in Spain
- Operation Gladio
- Policía Armada
