= Argentine Anticommunist Alliance =

Argentine political terrorist group (1973–1976)

Argentine Anticommunist Alliance Alianza Anticomunista Argentina
- Logo of the General Command of the AAA
- Leaders: José López Rega; Rodolfo Almirón; Aníbal Gordon; Alberto Villar; Luis Margaride; Isabel Perón
- Dates active: 1973–1976
- Active regions: Argentina
- Ideology: Radical anti-communism Orthodox Peronism; Neo-fascism
- Political position: Far-right
- Status: Dissolved

The Argentine Anticommunist Alliance (Spanish: Alianza Anticomunista Argentina, usually known as Triple A or AAA) was an Argentine far-right or radical anti-communist political paramilitary group operated by a sector of the Federal Police and the Argentine Armed Forces, linked with the Italian pseudo-Masonic lodge and criminal organisation Propaganda Due (see Licio Gelli), that killed artists, priests, intellectuals, leftist politicians, students, historians and union members, as well as issuing threats and carrying out extrajudicial killings and forced disappearances during the presidencies of Juan Perón and Isabel Perón between 1973 and 1976. The group was responsible for the disappearance and death of between 700 and 1100 people.

The Triple A was secretly led by José López Rega, Minister of Social Welfare and personal secretary of Juan Perón. Rodolfo Almirón, arrested in Spain in 2006, was alleged to be his chief operating officer of the group, and was officially head of López Rega's and Isabel Perón's personal security. He was extradited from Spain in 2006 and prosecuted; he died in jail in June 2009. SIDE agent Anibal Gordon was another important member of the Triple A, although he always denied it. He was tried in Argentina in 1985 after the restoration of democracy and convicted in October 1986. Gordon died in prison of lung cancer the next year.

In 2006, Argentine Judge Norberto Oyarbide ruled the Triple A had committed "crimes against humanity," which meant their crimes were exempt from statutes of limitations. Suspects can be prosecuted for actions committed in the 1970s and early 1980s.

== History ==
=== Background ===
Historian Osvaldo Bayer and researcher Atilio Borón have argued that the Triple A has antecedents in the parapolice bands that emerged at the beginning of the 1, following the Social Defense Decree Law.

=== Creation ===
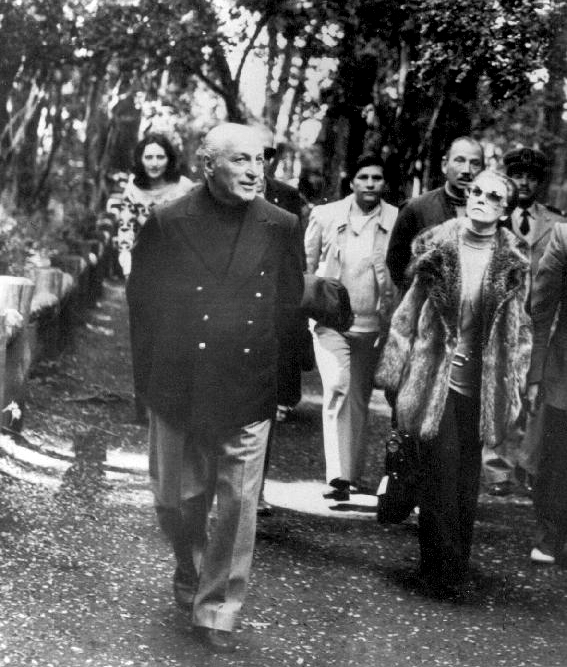
José López Rega, head of the Triple A.

José López Rega, from 1973 when he was appointed Minister of Social Welfare by Héctor J. Cámpora, began to surround himself with militants from other groups who "wanted to eliminate the left", among them former members of the Tacuara Nationalist Movement of the Movimiento Nueva Argentina (MNA), militants of the Juventud Federal of the Peronist leader Manuel de Anchorena, of the Concentración Nacional Universitaria, of the Comando de Organización, technical cadres of Guardia de Hierro and orthodox trade union groups specialized in doctrinal training. In addition, he created the Juventud Peronista República Argentina (JPRA), because he needed an apparatus that would go out to fight for "the streets" directly against the Tendencia, groups that responded organically to the organizations Fuerzas Armadas Revolucionarias and Montoneros (which financed themselves with bank robberies and kidnappings of businessmen for ransom). The organization was sustained with resources from the Ministry, and it even allowed them entry into the youth branch of the Peronist Superior Council, the institutional body from which they began to combat the Juventud Peronista Regionales, the surface organization of Montoneros.

The Triple A was believed to have been organized in 1973 by José López Rega and Alberto Villar, deputy chief of the Argentine federal police, during the brief interim presidency of Raúl Lastiri in 1973. Reportedly, the movement was conceived at a high-level Peronist meeting on 1 October 1973, attended by President Raúl Lastiri, Interior Minister Benito Llambí, Social Welfare Minister José López Rega, general secretary of the Presidency José Humberto Martiarena and various provincial governors. The group operated under the governments of Lastiri, Perón and Isabel Perón through López Rega resignation and exile in July 1975. Villar and his wife were murdered in 1974 with a bomb that was planted on his cabin cruiser in Tigre by members of the Montoneros, a militant, leftist group.

Workers of the Ministry and militants of the Juventud Peronista de la República Argentina (JPRA) began to simulate attacks by Montoneros against themselves as part of a strategy to present themselves as military targets of left-wing groups, which allowed them to revalue themselves within the Ministry.

In a warehouse called "microcine", in the second basement of the Ministry, weapons were stored. A significant supply occurred after Manuel de Anchorena was appointed ambassador to the United Kingdom. Through his management in that country, he arranged for two hundred Sten MKII submachine guns to be sent, which could be easily disassembled and also came with a silencer adaptable to another weapon widely used in the Ministry, the Sterling. Payment was carried out through the Directorate of Administration.

López Rega, a devotee of occultism and self-styled divinator, became a powerful force in the Peronist movement. He exerted great influence over Perón, who was elected to the presidency and took office in 1973, and his wife Isabel Perón, elected as vice-president, who succeeded to the presidency upon Perón's sudden death on 1 July 1974. To support the paramilitary group, López Rega drew on funds from the Ministry of Social Welfare, which he controlled. Some of the members of the Triple A had earlier taken part in the Peronist 1973 Ezeiza massacre. On the day Perón returned from exile, snipers shot and killed numerous (13 at least killed) left-wing Peronists at the mass gathering to welcome his return, leading to the definitive separation between left and right-wing Peronists.

There are theories about the name of the Alliance that could be due to the esoteric profile of López Rega, who believed that the morality of humanity would evolve as the three magnetic vertices of the triangle of the Triple A developed.

The Spanish Judge Baltazar Garzón's investigations, directed at human rights abuses internationally, revealed that Italian neofascist Stefano Delle Chiaie had also worked with the Triple A, and was present at Ezeiza. Delle Chiaie also worked with the Chilean DINA in Chile, and for Hugo Banzer, a Bolivian dictator.

According to a 1983 article in The New York Times, the group was founded when there were an increasing number of guerrilla attacks by left-wing militant groups, which were met by harsh repression of political dissidents on the part of the military, paramilitary and police forces. This environment of social unrest was the justification used by the subsequent military junta for its Dirty War against political opponents.

=== Attacks prior to the public emergence of the Triple A ===
On 15 August, militants of the JP who were carrying out a demonstration in support of the resigning governor Bidegain were detained and tortured. On 7 September, Oscar Suárez, upon recovering his freedom in Tucumán, denounced that he had been a victim of torture inflicted by Héctor García Rey, chief of the provincial police, linked to López Rega.

On 14 September, the "Ateneo 20 de junio" of the JP was machine-gunned by unknown assailants. On the 19th, the Federación Gráfica Bonaerense denounced the disappearance of Sergio Joaquín Maillman, 24 years old. On the 13th he had been seen wounded and beaten when he was taken out of a light-blue Ford Falcon and introduced into the house at Miraflores 2044. At the end of that block was installed the Fifth Surveillance Corps of the Federal Police. The car in which he arrived at Miraflores had license plate C 468.596, whose registered owner was María Esther Tagarelli de Martini, an official of the Ministry of Social Welfare.

On 23 September, Perón was elected president and on 25 September José Ignacio Rucci, secretary general of the CGT, was assassinated. Researcher Julieta Rostica maintains:

The competition between Rucci and López Rega to lead the Peronist right ended on 25 September 1973, when Rucci was assassinated. The attribution of the assassination to Montoneros was used to the benefit of López Rega because it legitimized the proposal for the creation of the "death squads".

On 28 September, in Rosario, the lawyer Roberto Raúl Catalá was shot; the attackers left pamphlets in which they assigned themselves the character of "anti-Marxist commands".

During October, in Córdoba, the JP militant Ramón Fajardo was wounded by gunfire. Armed members of the Juventud Sindical Peronista took over the headquarters of Banco Social; bombs were detonated at the homes of provincial deputies Fausto Rodríguez and Miguel A. Marcattini, members of the Frejuli. A bomb also exploded at the home of Senator Tejada, president of the provincial Senate, and Leandro Fote and other militants of popular organizations were detained during a "dragnet" operation. In Corrientes, the Frente de Izquierda Popular denounced the explosion of a bomb at its premises. In Tucumán, the Provincial Board of Justicialism, following instructions from the Superior Council presided over by Humberto Martiarena, "will alert all comrades to the situation of war against Marxist groups". In Mar del Plata, the home of the Juventud Peronista leader Andrés Cabo was set on fire, and the same occurred with that of the secretary of the local university and JP member Alfredo Cuestas. In Mendoza, a bomb exploded in the office of the governor of Mendoza, Martínez Baca, questioned by right-wing sectors of Justicialism.

In the province of Buenos Aires, at the Communist Party premises on Estados Unidos and Sáenz Peña streets a bomb that did not explode was found; another exploded at the Basic Unit "Mártires de Trelew", at Urquiza 2193, which caused extensive damage. Nemesio Aquino, a member of the JP and affiliated with the Basic Unit "Héroes de Trelew", was murdered. Journalist José Colombo, of the newspaper El Norte, was also killed in San Nicolás, and the attackers stated that that newspaper was "full of communists". His widow denounced that "in the San Nicolás regional CGT there is a list of 141 'bolches' in which my husband and I were included". The leader Dante Gullo denounced a series of attacks against JP premises. Opposition leaders expressed concern over the "anti-Marxist instructions" formulated within Peronism. The Unión Tranviarios Automotor (UTA) carried out a strike over the kidnapping of Oscar Arca, delegate of the company Costera Criolla and member of the JTP.

==== Reserved document of the PJ Superior Council ====
On 1 October, at a meeting convened by the provisional president of the Peronist Superior Council, Raúl Lastiri, and the Minister of the Interior, Benito Llambí, and in the presence of Juan Domingo Perón, who attended in his capacity as president-elect, the council declared itself in a "state of war" against the "Marxist infiltrators of the Movement". The Council drafted a "reserved document" that was read by Senator José Humberto Martiarena and distributed among the governors present. Through the document, the Justicialist National Movement called to "assume self-defense and attack the enemy on all fronts and with the greatest determination", arguing that in this lay the life of the Movement and of its leaders. For the purposes of that defense, it issued a series of directives, declaring the state of mobilization of material and human elements to confront that war, calling for a campaign of reaffirmation of Justicialist doctrinal principles that should clarify the differences with Marxism. Item 6, "Intelligence", warned that "in all districts an intelligence system will be organized at the service of this struggle, which will be linked to the central body that will be created". Item 9, "Means of struggle", specified: "All those considered efficient will be used, in each place and opportunity. The necessity of the means proposed will be assessed by the leaders of each district". After this document, the "witch hunt" and illegal repression against the left by state agents began.

==== The Deleroni case ====
On Tuesday, 27 November, Antonio Tito Deleroni, a lawyer for political prisoners and a local leader of Base Peronism, was with his wife Nélida Arana, Chiche, at the San Miguel train station, former partido of General Sarmiento (Buenos Aires). Minutes earlier they had finished a long after-dinner gathering with other militants at the restaurant La Positiva, in front of the station. As a train from the Federal Capital was arriving, a young man approached the couple and, while drawing a weapon, began to confront Deleroni: "So you're seeing my wife." Chiche, anticipating the situation, tried to shield her husband by placing herself between them, but it was in vain: the attacker did not hesitate to fire three shots at her; he then knocked her husband down with a blow from the butt of the gun and, once he was on the ground, shot him seven times at point-blank range. Despite the proximity of the police station—40 meters away—the police did not appear; it was an off-duty officer traveling on the train who pursued and apprehended the attacker: Julio Ricardo Villanueva, who did not have a wife. He was a former bodyguard of the Ministry of Social Welfare and a member of the Agrupación 20 de Noviembre, from the locality of San Martín. When brought before the judge, he declared himself to be a "purger of Marxists within the Movement" and to be "acting according to the directives of the reserved document".

=== During the third government of Perón (1973–1974) ===
Perón assumed his third presidency on 12 October 1973. On 14 October, Constantino Razzeti, a biochemist and JP leader, was assassinated. In Santos Lugares, after being doused with gasoline, the Ateneo Peronista "Heroica Resistencia", located at Avenida La Plata 3820, was set on fire; the Superior Council of the JP of the 3 de Febrero Partido operated there, some of whose militants had been subjected to provocations days earlier by the Comando de Organización directed in the area by Susana Thompson. On the 26th, the Concentración Nacional Universitaria (CNU), the Comando Universitario Peronista de Derecho (CUPDED), the Legión Revolucionaria Peronista, the Grupos de Acción Peronistas (GAP), the Movimiento Universitario Nacional (MUN) and other right-wing organizations held an event in the Aula Magna of the Faculty of Law that ended with damage to the facilities. The meeting had the support of the CGT and of the Provisional Superior Council of Justicialism. Among those present were Alejandro Giovenco, Juan Carlos Gómez (identified as the murderer of the student Silvia Filler in Mar del Plata in 1972 and a police official), Jorge Rampoldi (member of the former Sindicato de Derecho), César Augusto (from the same entity), Raúl Padrés, Rodolfo Galloso and José Luis Núñez, with similar backgrounds. The dean Mario Kestelboim requested police intervention, which manifested itself in the presence of sub-commissioner Solano. The official stated that he could not act without consulting his superiors, for which reason he withdrew. Nor did the patrol cars or the assault vehicle stationed in the vicinity intervene.

In the same month, the official agency TELAM reported that in Tucumán the anti-subversive police commissions had also been composed of Peronist youths, who were provided with weapons. These mixed commissions were commanded by the chief of the Tucumán police, Héctor Luis García Rey.

==== The acronym AAA appears ====
The first attack attributed to the Triple A took place on 21 November 1973, when a bomb was placed in the car of the radical senator Hipólito Solari Yrigoyen, who during the previous dictatorship had acted as a defender of political prisoners and, as senator, had harshly criticized the draft Law of Professional Associations submitted to Parliament by the Executive Branch. The device exploded and injured the senator in the legs, but failed to kill him; two years later they would repeat the attempt with another explosive device without achieving their objective.

At the end of 1973, the Triple A circulated a "black list" of personalities who "will be immediately executed wherever they are found": left-wing militants; Homero Cristali, alias J. Posadas; Hugo Bressano, alias Nahuel Moreno, leader of the Socialist Workers Party; the lawyers Silvio Frondizi (brother of former president Arturo), Mario Hernández and Gustavo Roca. It also included the leaders Mario Roberto Santucho, leader of the Workers' Revolutionary Party; the trade unionists Armando Jaime, Raimundo Ongaro, René Salamanca and Agustín Tosco; professor Rodolfo Puiggrós (former interventor rector of the University of Buenos Aires), the lawyer Manuel Gaggero (interim director of the newspaper El Mundo); Ernesto Giudice, a resigning member of the Communist Party; the lawyer Roberto Quieto, leader of Montoneros, and Julio Troxler, former deputy chief of Police of the Province of Buenos Aires, close to Peronismo de Base. The list was completed with Colonels Luis César Perlinger and Juan Jaime Cesio, the bishop of La Rioja, Monsignor Enrique Angelelli, and the national senator Luis Carnevale.

On 4 January 1974, the Federal Police raided in Buenos Aires the bookstores Fausto, Atlántida, Rivero and Santa Fe, where it arrested employees for distributing books. Some of those banned were La boca de la ballena, by Héctor Lastra; Territorios, by Marcelo Pichón Riviere; Sólo ángeles, by Enrique Medina and The Buenos Aires Affair, by Manuel Puig. All copies were seized.

In April 1974, the chief of the Federal Police Miguel Ángel Iñíguez attempted to dismantle the Triple A organization and ordered the arrest of Margaride. In an interview granted in 1986 to the journalist Santiago Pinetta, Iñíguez himself stated that his resignation occurred as a result of his enmity with López Rega, who after the assassination of José Ignacio Rucci began to demand from the government the creation of death squads to combat "subversion".

He maintained that the time had come to kidnap and kill adversaries. And also that their families had to be annihilated.

When conveying this request to Perón, the president:

[...] was inflexible at a conference held in Vicente López, in which he told me verbatim: "Do not pay attention to that madman, you just limit yourself to applying the law".

On 11 May, Father Carlos Mugica was ambushed when leaving the church of San Francisco Solano in Villa Luro, where he had just celebrated Mass. According to witnesses, it was Rodolfo Eduardo Almirón, a high-ranking member of the Triple A, who shot him with a submachine gun in the abdomen and the thorax, causing his death a few minutes later after being transferred to a hospital. According to Miguel Bonasso, upon learning of the death, the Peronist leader Arturo Sampay told him:

The murder of Father Mugica is Perón's response to your withdrawal from the Plaza. It is a Machiavellian operation intended for the militants of the Tendencia to kill each other. Too intelligent for it to have occurred to the brute López Rega.

=== During the government of Isabel Perón (1974–1976) ===
On 6 August 1974 four Peronist militants were kidnapped by the Triple A at their homes; hours later the bodies were found riddled with bullets in the city of La Plata, the retired non-commissioned officer Ireneo Chávez and his son Rolando Chávez; Luis Mancor, a journalism student, and the head of the Sindicato Único de Petroleros, Carlos Pierini.

According to González Janzen, between July and September 1974 220 Triple A attacks took place, almost three per day, sixty murders, one every 19 hours, and 44 victims resulted with serious injuries. There were also 20 kidnappings, one every two days.

On 10 September 1974, the lawyer Alfredo Alberto Curutchet in the locality of San Isidro was seized in public, bound and riddled with bullets by members of the Triple A. The lawyer's body was found dead on a street in the locality of Béccar thanks to an anonymous police report of submachine gun bursts in the area. The lifeless body "was found face down and bound with a leather belt; next to him, scattered on the ground, were thirty-one spent 9 mm cartridges and two spent 12-gauge shotgun shells".

On 15 November 1974 Marta Adelina Zamaro y Nilsa Urquía were kidnapped by the Comisión Anticomunista del Litoral (CAL), a kind of Santa Fe version of the Triple A. Their bodies were found near Esperanza the following day with signs of torture by electric prod, beatings and drowning. On 2 December, Berta Molina de Montenegro, a member of the Workers' Revolutionary Party, was murdered, her death being mentioned by the ERP in one of its communiqués.

During November 1974, attacks were carried out that are attributed to it or were claimed by the organization itself: a bomb was detonated at a Juventud Peronista premises; a bomb against the person of the recently appointed interventor of the National University of the Littoral; a bomb exploded at the premises of the Frente Antiimperialista por el Socialismo (FAS) in San Fernando; at the FAS premises in Virreyes another bomb was detonated; Manuel Carballo, a member of the JP, was shot; several Peronist militants who were at the Basic Unit "Evita" celebrating Mother's Day were attacked by a group of thugs.

That month, an individual fired five shots at Antonio José Delleroni and his wife, Nélida Arana, when, together with several people, they were waiting on a platform of the San Martín Railway station. Both victims had been active in Peronismo de Base and had defended, as lawyers, numerous political prisoners; Delleroni, for his part, had become a member of the PJ in General Sarmiento. The police managed to capture the perpetrator and determined that he was Ricardo Julio Villanueva. The killer admitted belonging to the Justicialist National Movement and residing at Medrano 70, headquarters of the "Escuela Superior de Conducción Política", linked to the Unión Obrera Metalúrgica (UOM) and the Justicialist Superior Council headed by Senator Martiarena. He declared that he had been following Delleroni since the previous day and that he had to eliminate him for being a member of the ERP. In a previous case for possession of weapons of war, Ricardo Julio Villanueva submitted a request for the return of personal effects on paper bearing the letterhead of the Juventud Peronista de la República Argentina directed by Julio Yessi (JPRA) and acknowledged being a "responsible" member of the "Agrupación 20 de noviembre", affiliated with that organization. He also declared being an employee of the Ministry of Social Welfare, headed by López Rega.

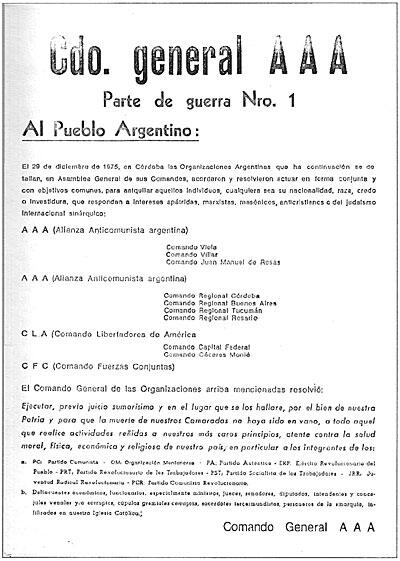
The Triple A War Report No. 1

In December, the car in which the deputy of the FreJuLi Juan Luis Lucero was traveling was riddled with bullets from another moving vehicle; at the time the deputy was the president of the Investigative Commission on Illegal Coercion and Torture of the Legislature of Santa Fe, and had made public the results of the investigation into the death of the Peronist militant Ángel "Tacuarita" Brandazza; there was another attack only a few days later against the same deputy, by means of a bomb placed in his car, which was completely destroyed; in Buenos Aires, a group of individuals occupied the Basic Unit "Evita Capitana" in Villa Detri and set fire to the furniture and facilities, before leaving they wrote on the walls "Somos muchos" and "JPRA"; in the same province, Carlos Manco, a collaborator of the Alianza Popular Revolucionaria, was kidnapped, subjected to interrogation and beaten for two consecutive days and then abandoned in the vicinity of Ramos Mejía; Manco was taken into the premises of the Asociación de Trabajadores de Sanidad and then transferred to the basement of a construction site located opposite; before releasing him, the kidnappers gave him threatening instructions not to mention ATSA in his statements; a bomb exploded at the home of Dr. Viaggio, a lawyer and member of the Communist Party, who represented some Chilean refugees who had recently arrived in the country as asylees.

==== End of its activities ====
On 19 July 1975, the Grenadiers discovered, when dismantling the office of the resigning López Rega in the Ministry, an arsenal of war weapons, including submachine guns, hand grenades and sniper rifles. The resulting scandal implicated him, as well as Isabel, in accusations of corruption for misappropriation of government funds.

According to the journalist Hernán López Echagüe, the activity of the extreme right came to be directed by the trade unionist Lorenzo Miguel.

== Organization ==
Although denied at the time, José López Rega created and coordinated the Triple A to combat left-wing sectors within Peronism.

Together with Federal Police chief Alberto Villar, he organized the group during the interim presidency of Raúl Lastiri in 1973. Funds from the Ministry of Social Welfare were diverted to finance the organization. López Rega remained influential under both Perón and his successor Isabel Perón, partly due to shared spiritualist beliefs.

== Methods ==
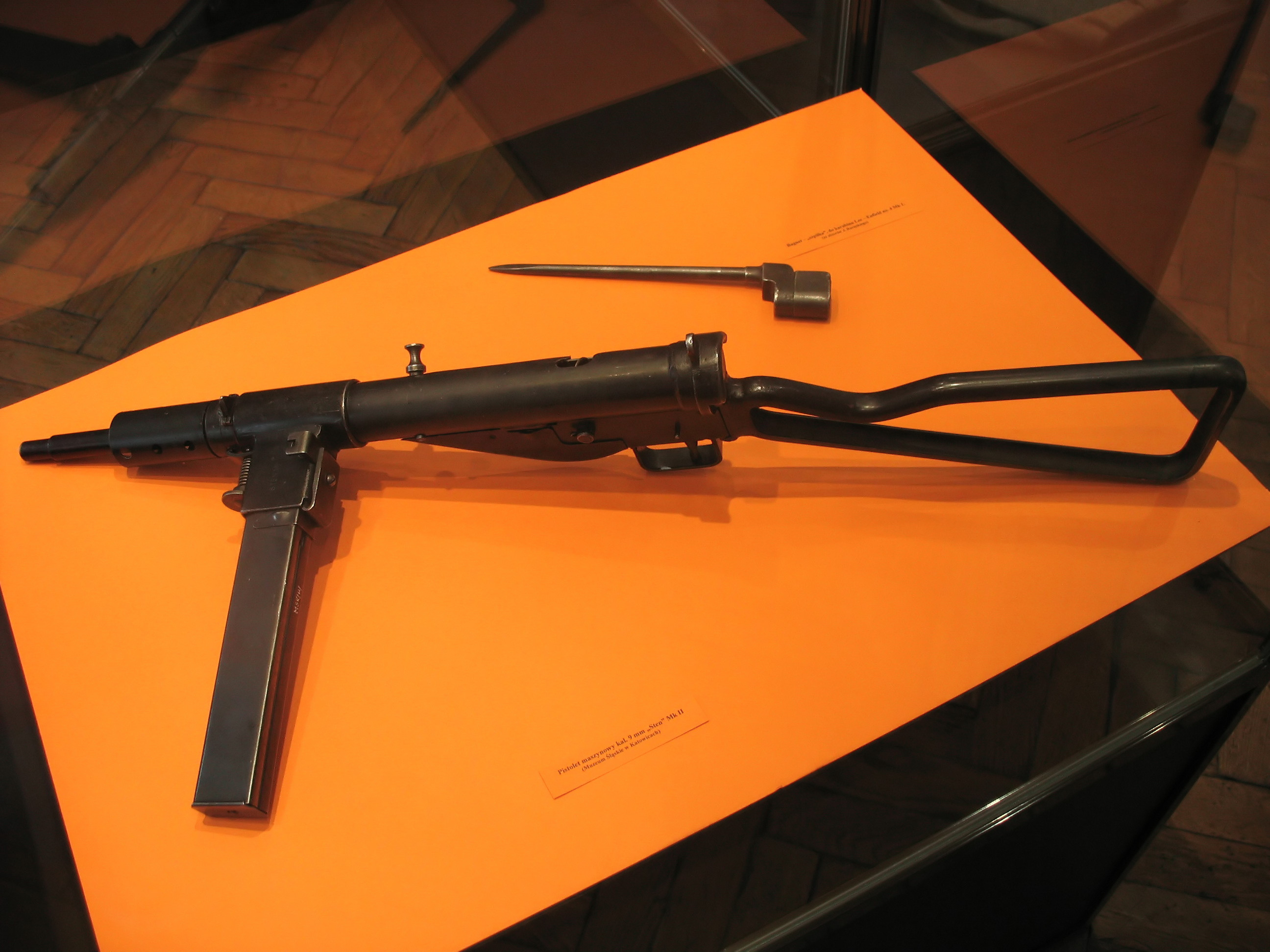
The Sten submachine gun, one of the weapons used by the Triple A.

In many cases, they were popular militants or trade unionists arrested in their homes or in public by a group of men with police credentials, in uniform or not. Later, these persons appeared riddled with bullets. Bomb attacks and bursts of submachine gun fire were another method used by the parapolice group from the beginning of the illegal repression.

There were cases in which detainees were transported hooded and handcuffed in vans bearing the legend of the Ministry of the Interior or "R. 2 Sec. Inteligencia", to the Ministry of Social Welfare, where they were tortured by police using beatings or electric prods.

The Triple A adopted increasingly violent procedures in an escalation. Kidnappings, rape and executions of women were methods incorporated into the "ritual" of terror. The elimination of entire families was practiced as a brutal form of "punishment". The use of explosives against victims was also resorted to.

According to certain authors, the Triple A set out to carry out a campaign in the media against people who did not agree with the government and to make the image of José López Rega "more acceptable". Groups sent by the Press Secretariat occupied television channels 9 and 11, followed by channels 7 and 13. Through these media, the Triple A announced the names of future victims or issued statements to explain certain killings.

== Debate on Perón's role in the creation of the Triple A ==
In recent years, a debate has emerged regarding the responsibility of then-president Juan Domingo Perón in the formation of the Triple A. The theory that Perón was involved in the creation of the Triple A is supported by journalists Juan Bautista Yofre, Hugo Gambini, Pacho O'Donnell, Joaquín Morales Solá, Sergio Bufano, Marina Franco and Marcelo Larraquy, among others.

Some authors do not involve Perón in the actions of the Triple A; others maintain that he knew of its existence, while others believe that the assassination of José Ignacio Rucci in 1973, whom Perón considered like a son, motivated the president to create a parapolice organization to combat the left wing of his movement. Some authors and historians argue that, shortly after Rucci's assassination, Perón mentioned to Governor Oscar Bidegain the need to create a parapolice organization similar to the Catalan somatén of the first third of the 1: "Lo que hace falta en la Argentina es un somatén". On the other hand, former minister Antonio Cafiero stated that Perón knew that an organization was killing guerrilla fighters, but that he neither ordered, controlled, nor directed it.

According to Eduardo Gurucharri (biographer of Major Bernardo Alberte), former minister —of Cámpora, Perón and Isabel— Antonio J. Benítez would have witnessed a meeting presided over by Perón before assuming the presidency, which he described as follows:

Benítez refiere que López Rega y el comisario Villar exhibieron fotografías y nombraron personalidades políticas que deben ser depuradas de la infiltración marxista. Entre los nombrados están el propio Eduardo Luis Duhalde, el abogado Mario Hernández y Alberte. Benítez dijo que Perón se limitó a escuchar, sin aprobar ni desaprobar a quienes aludieron a la necesidad de operar por izquierda.

Journalist Ignacio González Janzen states that the orders of the Argentine Armed Forces at the end of 1973 were "no tomar prisioneros".

According to one version, deputy Carlos Kunkel resigned his seat after Perón threatened him and the Juventud Peronista group with the following expression: "En una semana se termina todo esto, porque formo una fuerza suficiente, lo voy a buscar a usted y lo mato". Kunkel, who in 1973 was active in Montoneros, declared in 2007 —when he was a deputy for the Front for Victory— that in the period 1973–1976 there were acts of terrorism in which "se usaron elementos parapoliciales, paramilitares, con recursos del Estado, para acciones violentas" and opined that "Perón ni remotamente tuvo que ver con la Triple A; Isabel, no creo".

Guido Lissandrello contributed as evidence the promotions granted by Perón and Lastiri to members of the organization. In 1974, Perón promoted Minister López Rega, who had been a corporal in the Federal Police, to commissioner general by decree No. 1350/74. Villar was promoted to deputy chief. Margaride was appointed superintendent. Rodolfo Almirón was incorporated into the Federal Police by decree of Lastiri (Decree 1858) and appointed inspector (Decree 562). Morales was appointed police inspector. All of them were operational leaders of the Triple A.

According to the Peronist philosopher José Pablo Feinmann, in December 1973 Perón had said:

Muchas veces me han dicho que creemos un batallón de la muerte como el que tienen los brasileños, o que formemos una organización parapolicial para hacerle la guerrilla a la guerrilla. Pienso que eso no es posible ni conveniente. Hay una ley y una justicia y quien delinca se enfrentará a esa ley y a esa justicia por la vía natural que toda democracia asegura a la ciudadanía. Creer lo contrario sería asegurar la injusticia, y andaríamos matando gente en la calle que ni merece ni tiene porqué morir (...) Yo no he de entrar por el camino de la violencia, porque si a la violencia de esos elementos le agrego la violencia del Estado, no llegamos a ninguna solución.

The Peronist historian Felipe Pigna maintains that the Triple A operated with the knowledge and acquiescence of Perón:

… un todo poderoso José López Rega que también se frota las manos frente al accionar guerrillero y lanza la Triple A, esta organización paramilitar, paraestatal, financiada por el Estado sin ninguna duda, muy probablemente con el conocimiento de Perón, es muy difícil que Perón no conociera la existencia de semejante organización, me parece un poco infantil a esta altura del partido, creo que le hace un flaco favor a Perón incluso negar que semejante estadista y semejante político ignorara que a cincuenta metros de su despacho se está formando un grupo paramilitar de las características de la Triple A, me parece que ver esto como algo de lo que no hay que hablar es uno de los problemas que tenemos a la hora de leer la historia, creo que hay que decir todo lo que a uno le caiga simpático o lo que no le caiga simpático en torno a hablar de lo que tenemos que hablar que es el horror que comienza antes de la dictadura con esta práctica de la Triple A…

== Accusations ==
=== Intelligence report on financing ===
In December 1975, a report from Army Intelligence stated that José López Rega was the head of a cocaine trafficking organization that was processed in hidden laboratories in Salta Province, near the border with Bolivia, and transported to Buenos Aires by members of the Federal Police and sent through diplomatic pouches of members of the diplomatic service. According to that report, the organization also included, among others, the Minister of Foreign Affairs Alberto Vignes, the national senator from Salta Juan Carlos Cornejo Linares, and the future governor of Salta Roberto Romero. The money obtained from these illicit activities was used to finance the activities of the Triple A.

=== Military case ===
In 1974, Lieutenant Juan Segura of the Argentine Army discovered, "by chance", the Triple A headquarters in the offices of the publication El caudillo, financed by López Rega. (Note: The lieutenant was returning from an official act at the Casa Rosada, when he suffered a mechanical failure on Avenida Figueroa Alcorta, after which he was assisted by police officers who took him into what appeared to be a private house, telling him that he was "among comrades of the same cause".)

Later, Colonel Humberto Sosa Molina was summoned by López Rega to his office at the Ministry of the Interior, where both deployed their armed guards to avoid intimidation. López Rega then cried over the complaint filed by Sosa Molina and denied any connection with the "Triple A". (Note: The lieutenant filed a judicial complaint before federal judge Teófilo Lafuente, but the organization was warned before the raid, and the building was vacated before the judiciary intervened. Additionally, the judge requested from the Army Commander, Jorge Rafael Videla, the background of the case. Videla responded, after being summoned three times under threat of a "trial for disobedience", that he would not provide the requested information because it was "a secret operation that must remain completely confidential".)

In July 1975, by means of two presidential decrees, López Rega and much of the leadership of the Triple A were sent to the "Kingdom of Spain in order to fulfill a diplomatic mission".

=== Crimes against humanity case ===
The original case also included other defendants, among them Rodolfo Almirón. In 2006, a journalistic investigation published Almirón's whereabouts and, from Buenos Aires, judge Norberto Oyarbide updated his arrest warrant, so on 23 December 2006 he was arrested in Torrente (Valencia). For this, the judge ruled that the crimes committed by the Triple A must be considered "crimes against humanity" and therefore not subject to statutes of limitation. This was confirmed in 2008 by the Federal Chamber.

However, the case saw no progress, except for the deaths of the main accused (as in the case of López Rega, Ramón Morales, Felipe Romeo and Rodolfo Eduardo Almirón), so the Federal Chamber in 2010 criticized Oyarbide's "inexplicable passivity" in the case.

== Investigations ==
In 1975, the then leader of the UCR, Ricardo Balbín, produced a detailed report on the Triple A, which he personally delivered to Isabel Martínez de Perón. The national deputy and leader of the Partido Revolucionario Cristiano (Christian Revolutionary Party), Horacio Sueldo, also denounced the crimes of parapolice groups but, due to threats and attacks, was forced into hiding to avoid being killed. Héctor Sandler was persecuted for his denunciations and forced into exile.

From the government, the denunciations were denied or dismissed. Minister Alberto Rocamora declared that "left-wing subversion is acting continuously and, on the other hand, the so-called AAA act sporadically; I do not know what their nature is nor who encourages the Triple A", confirming the government's awareness of the parapolice group. However, this was later denied by Minister of the Interior Antonio Benítez, in a parliamentary session: "The government has no knowledge of the existence of the Triple A." Later, in press statements, he added: "We do not know whether the Triple A exists or not; we do not know if it is the terrorist left itself under a new name".

The Minister of Labour Carlos Ruckauf stated that "the country is at war and all Argentine society must become aware that the enemy is waging a total war".

=== Later investigations ===
==== Secretariat of Human Rights of the Nation ====
In the annexes added by the Secretariat of Human Rights of the Nation to the report Nunca más prepared by the CONADEP, on the 30th anniversary of the coup, there are records of complaints from the beginning of the constitutional government of Héctor José Cámpora on 25 May 1973 until the coup d'état of 24 March 1976, which overthrew President María Estela Martínez de Perón, of around six hundred forced disappearances prior to the 1976 coup and five hundred summary executions.

Death threats drove many into exile, from scientists such as Manuel Sadosky; journalists such as Pepe Eliaschev; psychoanalysts such as Marie Langer; artists such as Héctor Alterio, Mercedes Sosa, Pino Solanas, Norman Briski, Inda Ledesma, Armando Tejada Gómez, David Stivel, Luis Brandoni, Horacio Guarany and Nacha Guevara.

==== Other investigations ====
According to the most cited works, between July and September 1974 alone, the Triple A carried out 220 attacks, resulting in 60 deaths and 44 serious injuries, in addition to 20 kidnappings. The overall estimate is around 1,500 crimes, some of which qualify as crimes against humanity.

According to the National Memory Archive, between 20 June 1973, the day of the Ezeiza massacre, and the beginning of the military dictatorship, there were 900 disappearances and 1,500 murders. They estimate that 3,000 people were imprisoned for political reasons.

On 9 May 1975, María del Carmen Maggi, dean of the Faculty of Humanities of the Catholic University of Mar del Plata, was kidnapped. Her body appeared a year later, the day before the coup d'état, on 23 March 1976, on a beach in Mar Chiquita.

Román Lejtman, as a documentary filmmaker, obtained the testimony of Ramón Landajo, former secretary to Perón, who stated that Colonel Rolo Franco told him they had orders to kill him; he was a member of the Triple A.

== Arrests ==
The operational chief of the Triple A was Commissioner Juan Ramón Morales, who was López Rega's right-hand man. In the judicial case, Morales was defended by Army Major Lawyer Jorge Humberto Appiani, who is currently detained in Entre Ríos for crimes against humanity. In February 2016, four civilians and one Buenos Aires provincial police officer who had been part of the paramilitary organization from formal positions in the Ministry of Social Welfare were convicted.

== Victims ==
The group first came to national attention on 21 November 1973 in its attempt to murder Argentine Senator Hipólito Solari Yrigoyen by a car bomb. The AAA went on to kill 1,122 people, according to an appendix to the 1983 CONADEP report, including suspected Montoneros and ERP leftist terrorists and their sympathizers, but the group expanded its targets to other political opponents, including judges, police chiefs, and social activists. In total, it is suspected of having killed more than 1500 people.

The group is strongly suspected in the 1974 assassination of Jesuit priest Carlos Mugica, a friend of Mario Firmenich, the founder of Montoneros. Other people murdered by the organisation include Silvio Frondizi, brother of former president Arturo Frondizi; Julio Troxler, former-vice director of the police; Alfredo Curutchet, a defense attorney for political prisoners; and Hipólito Atilio López, a key union leader of Córdoba. The CONADEP commission on human rights violations documented the Triple A's execution of 19 homicides in 1973, 50 in 1974 and 359 in 1975, while its involvement in several hundred others is also suspected.

The 1986 study by Ignacio Jansen González is often cited; he estimates the group committed 220 terrorist attacks from July to September 1974, which killed 60 and severely wounded 44; as well as 20 kidnappings. Federal judge Norberto Oyarbide, who signed the extradition order against former leader of the AAA Rodolfo Almirón, ruled in December 2006 that Triple A's crimes qualified as human rights violations and the "beginning of the systematic process directed by the state apparatus" during the dictatorship.

Death threats caused many of the opposition to leave Argentina. Amongst many well-known and respected people who left are mathematician Manuel Sadosky; artists Héctor Alterio, Luis Brandoni and Nacha Guevara; politician and entrepreneur José Ber Gelbard; lawyer and politician Héctor Sandler; and actor Norman Briski.

Main assassinations claimed by the AAA:

- Murder of Ramón Samaniego on 12 April 1974
- Murder of Rodolfo David Ortega Peña on 31 July 1974
- Murder of Raúl Laguzzidel on 5 September 1974
- Murder of Alfredo Alberto Pérez Curutchet on 10 September 1974
- Kidnapping of Daniel Banfi, Luis Latrónica and Guillermo Jabif on 12 September 1974
- Murder of Julio Tomás Troxler on 20 September 1974
- Murders of Silvio Frondizi and his son-in-law Luis Ángel Mendiburu on 27 September 1974
- Murder of Carlos Ernensto Laham and Pedro Leopoldo Barraza on 13 October 1974.
- Murder of Domingo Devincenti on 6 November 1974

=== Others ===
After the fall of López Rega in 1975 and Jorge Rafael Videla's coup in March 1976, many Triple A members fled to Spain, where they became involved in assassinations of Spanish leftists during the first years of the Spanish transition. Fifteen former AAA members (including Rodolfo Almirón) were involved in the 1976 shooting of two left-wing Carlist members at a large annual gathering in Montejurra, Spain. Others implicated in the event were Italian neofascist Stefano Delle Chiaie and Jean-Pierre Cherid, former member of the French OAS and at the time part of the GAL death squad in Spain.

Former Triple A member José María Boccardo took part with Cherid and others in the 1978 assassination of Argala, an ETA member involved in the 1973 assassination of Franco's prime minister Luis Carrero Blanco.

== Connections with the Propaganda Due Masonic lodge ==
López Rega was a member of the irregular Masonic lodge Propaganda Due (P2), led by Licio Gelli, which participated in Operation Gladio in Europe. The modus operandi of the Ezeiza massacre was similar to that of the Montejurra incidents in Spain or the Taksim Square massacre in Turkey.

Admiral Massera, who together with others would later overthrow Isabel Martínez de Perón shortly after the fall and exile of López Rega, was also a member of the organization.

== See also ==
- 601 Intelligence Battalion
- Alianza Americana Anticomunista, in Colombia (Operation Condor)
- Grupos de Acción Anticomunista, in Paraguay (Operation Condor)
- Alianza Apostólica Anticomunista, in Spain (Operation Gladio)
- Montejurra Incidents
- Manuel Sadosky and Héctor Alterio were both threatened by the AAA.
- Rodolfo Almirón, leader of the group and charged in several murders (arrested in Valencia in 2006)
