= Montejurra incidents =

1976 neo-fascist terrorist attack in Spain

Coordinates: 42°37′37″N 2°3′24″W

- Supporters of the Carlist pretender, Carlos Hugo, protesting after the massacre took place. Estella, May 9, 1976.
- Location: Montejurra, Navarre
- Date: 9 May 1976
- Target: Carlist Party members
- Attack type: Shooting
- Weapon: Small arms
- Deaths: 2
- Injuries: 3
- Perpetrator: Far-right activists

The Montejurra incidents, was a neo-fascist terrorist attack that took place on 9 May 1976, when two Carlist members were killed and another three seriously wounded by right-wing gunmen at the annual Carlist Party celebration that was held in Montejurra, Navarre, Spain.

== The incident ==
The Carlists, members of a counter-revolutionary monarchist movement that joined the alliance of Nationalists supporting Franco in the Spanish Civil War (1936–1939), had split between their more traditional, counter-revolutionary, Ancien Régime, Catholic, anti-capitalistic, anti-socialistic, pro-legitimate monarchist adherents and a new confederal, socialist, autogestionary movement.

The left-wing part of the movement was the target of a violent incident organized by Franco's supporters, informally known as the bunker, who still controlled the state apparatus. Ricardo García Pellejero and Aniano Jiménez Santo, two supporters of Carlist pretender Carlos-Hugo de Borbón-Parma, were murdered by far-right gunmen. At the time of the events, the British magazine The Economist speculated about possible government involvement in the events:

The region is so tightly policed that opposition parties find it difficult to hold even small private meetings. Yet somehow on a hilltop surrounded by civil guards, more than 50 gunmen could establish themselves for 24 hours, set up an ambush, open fire and make their getaway without attracting official attention.

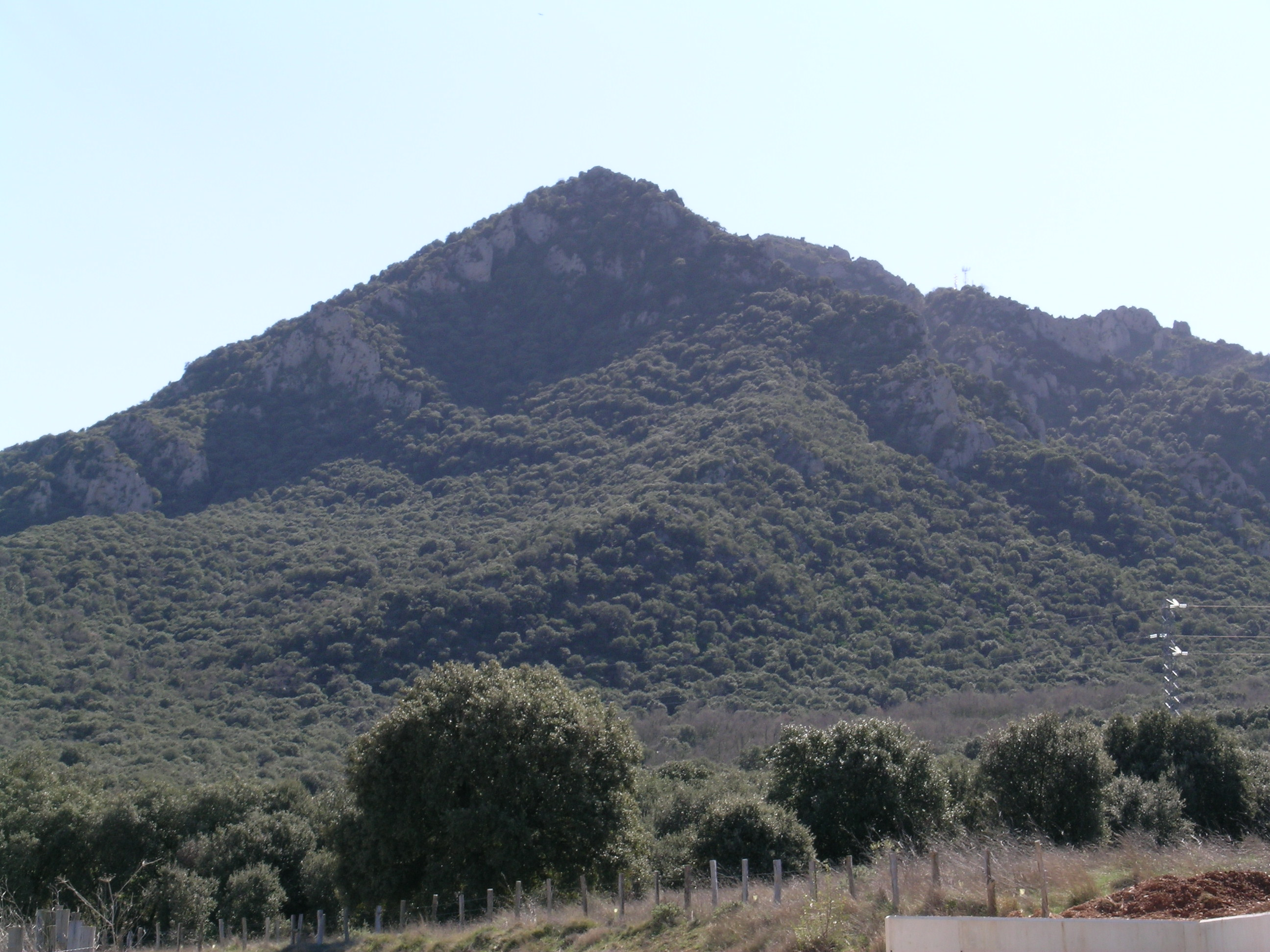
View of Montejurra from the Monastery of Irache.

Among the alleged perpetrators of the crime were Stefano Delle Chiaie, a neofascist Italian; and 15 former members of the Argentine Anticommunist Alliance (Triple A), including Rodolfo Almirón (who in 1983 was revealed to be chief of personal security for Manuel Fraga, Spain's Interior Minister). The public outcry at this report forced Fraga to dismiss Almirón. Jean Pierre Cherid, former member of the French OAS and then of the paramilitary Batallón Vasco Español and Spanish GAL death squads, was also present.

The Spanish intelligence agency SECED brought far-right members to the Montejurra celebrations, while other extremist organizations, such as the Guerrilleros de Cristo Rey, Fuerza Nueva, and others contacted members of the Italian International Fascists and of the Triple A. Augusto Cauchi would be later involved in the 1980 Bologna massacre, in which 85 people died in the bombing and more than 200 were wounded.

There were some claims that the attack was organized with the help of Carlos-Hugo's younger brother, Sixto Enrique de Borbón. He opposed Carlos Hugo's alteration of Carlism from an ultra-traditionalist political movement into a socialist movement. It is commonly accepted that high-ranking Guardia Civil officials, as well as the SECED (CESID's predecessor), supported the conspiracy (code-named Operación Reconquista). Founded by Carrero Blanco, SECED was directed at the time by General Juan Valverde. According to some historians, funding was provided by Antonio María de Oriol de Urquijo, one of the leaders of the far-right Carlists.

According to the memoirs of General Sáenz de Santa María, the conspiracy was organized in the office of General Juan Campano, the general director of the Guardia Civil. Sáenz de Santa María said Campano stated that Prime Minister Arias Navarro and Interior Minister Fraga approved the operation.

Although the murders took place in close proximity to security forces, they did not arrest anyone nor seize any weapons. There was photographic evidence of one of the right-wing terrorists taking part in the shootings, but he was not brought to trial.

== Consequences and follow-up ==
Under pressure from the Carlist Party, the government indicted two Spanish citizens, José Luis Marín García Verde and Hermenegildo García Llorente, for murder. The government released them without trial as part of a blanket amnesty for political prisoners in March 1977.

On 11 November 2003, after various failures, one of the Carlist Party's motions led to the Spanish high court ruling that the two dead Carlists were victims of terrorism. This enabled their families to claim compensation from the Spanish Government.

On behalf of the victims, in January 2007 Spanish lawyer José Angel Pérez Nievas pressed charges against Rodolfo Almirón, the leader of Triple A, saying he should be tried for his alleged actions during the Montejurra events. He had been apprehended in Spain in December 2006, following an arrest warrant for charges of murder and an extradition request issued by a judge in Argentina. While Almirón was returned to Argentina, he suffered a stroke and was unable to represent himself at trial. It was suspended and he was kept in detention, dying in 2009.

José Miguel Ruiz de Gordoa Armentia, son of the 1976 civil governor of Navarre, José Ruiz de Gordoa Quintana, when on his deathbed wrote a note, to be released after his death; it was made public in 2025. In the note he claims that on May 8 his father dined with Ramón Merino, at the time reportedly a close collaborator of Juan Carlos, who has just arrived from Madrid. Moreover, on the very day Ruiz de Gordoa Quintana had a phone conversation with the king. Quoting other anecdotal evidence Ruiz de Gordoa Armentia suggests that Juan Carlos was fully aware of administrative and security manoeuvres, taken prior to the incident. So far the former king has not commented the allegations.

== See also ==
- Carlism
- Ezeiza massacre
- Atocha massacre
- Operation Gladio
