= Argala =

Argala may refer to:

- Greater adjutant, a member of the stork family, from its Bengali name hurghila
- José Miguel Beñaran Ordeñana, an assassinated Basque leader, from his Basque nickname Argala ('Slim')
