= Joaquín Morales =

Joaquín Morales may refer to:

- Joaquín Morales Abarzúa (1919–2010), Chilean lawyer and politician
- Joaquín Morales Solá (born 1950), Argentine political journalist
- Joaquín Morales (footballer)
