= Puerto Bermejo =

Coordinates: 26°56′S 58°30′W

- Municipality and village
- Interactive map of Puerto Bermejo
- Country: Argentina
- Province: Chaco
- Department: Bermejo

Population (2001)
  - Total: 1,832
- Time zone: UTC−3 (ART)

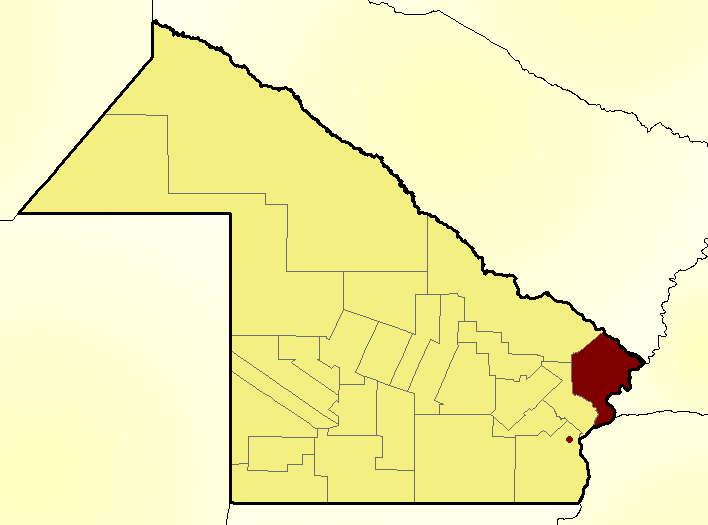

Puerto Bermejo is a village and municipality in Chaco Province in northern Argentina.

== Notable people ==
- Rodolfo Almirón, a former police officer and a leader of an extreme right-wing death squad known as the Triple A.
