= Silvio Frondizi =

Argentine intellectual and lawyer

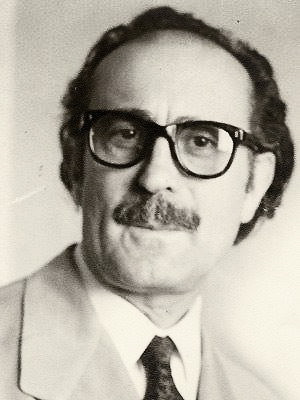
- Born: January 1, 1907
- Died: September 27, 1974 (aged 67)

Silvio Frondizi (January 1, 1907 — September 27, 1974) was an Argentine intellectual and lawyer, brother of President Arturo Frondizi and of the philosopher Risieri Frondizi. He became active in leftist groups, and was assassinated in 1974 by the Triple A right-wing death squad that operated under the Isabel Perón government.

== Biography ==
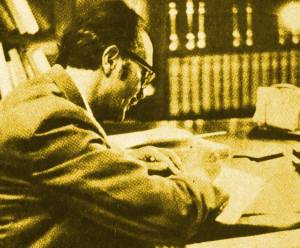
Silvio Frondizi 1965

Silvio Frondizi was born in Paso de los Libres, Corrientes Province, in 1907. He had brothers Arturo and Risieri.

He received a juris doctor from the University of Buenos Aires, and subsequently taught law at the University of Tucumán. Opposed to the 1943 coup d'état, he resigned his post in the university's administrative council, and in 1946, was purged from his academic post by order of the newly elected President Juan Perón, a populist with a strongly anti-communist stance.

Frondizi founded Praxis y Movimiento de Izquierda Revolucionaria (MIR-Praxis), a left-wing revolutionary group, in 1955. He then traveled to Cuba in support of Fidel Castro's revolution, meeting Che Guevara.

Frondizi taught law at both his alma mater and the University of La Plata, from 1958 onwards, when his brother, center-left UCRI leader Arturo Frondizi, was elected president. During the latter's tenure, Silvio Frondizi became known for his opposition to a 1959 bill supported by his brother, which supported the operation of parochial schools. As part of his law practice during the 1960s and early 1970s, he defended the Trotskyist Workers Revolutionary Party's (PRT) political prisoners.

=== Death ===
Silvio Frondizi was assassinated by the Triple A death squad in September 1974. SIDE agent and probable member of the Triple A Anibal Gordon was later convicted for his murder, while Rodolfo Almirón (likewise a principal in the Triple A), was indicted in 2006 for his murder.
