= Rodolfo Almirón =

Argentine police officer and death squad leader

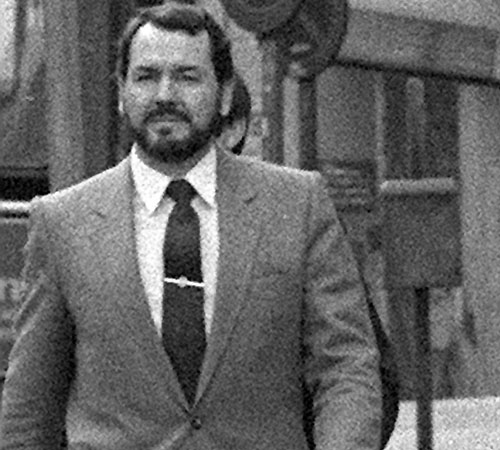
- Born: Rodolfo Eduardo Almirón Sena; 17 February 1936; Puerto Bermejo, Argentina
- Died: 5 June 2009 (aged 73); Buenos Aires, Argentina
- Military career
- Allegiance: Argentina
- Branch: Argentine Federal Police; Argentine Anticommunist Alliance
- Service years: 1960–1970, 1973–1976

Rodolfo Eduardo Almirón Sena (17 February 1936 – 5 June 2009) was an Argentine police officer and a leader of an extreme right-wing and orthodox peronist death squad known as the Triple A, operating in Argentina from 1973 to 1976 against the left wing of Peronists and other political dissidents. The group is held responsible for 1,500 murders of government opponents during the terms of Juan and Isabel Perón.

Almirón was alleged to be the chief operating officer of the squad and was charged with personally executing several murders. In 1975, shortly before the military takeover the following year, Almirón fled to Spain with José López Rega, founder of Triple A, who had been appointed ambassador plenipotentiary by Isabel Perón. Almirón was briefly located in 1983 in Spain, revealed to be working as chief of security for the former Interior Minister Manuel Fraga. Public outrage caused his dismissal, but he stayed in Spain.

In 2006, an Argentine judge ruled that the crimes committed by Almirón were crimes against humanity and thus excluded from statutes of limitations. A reporter for El Mundo located Almirón in Valencia in December 2006 and interviewed him. He was arrested in a subsidized flat in Torrent (Valencia) for murder by the National Police that month, under an extradition request from Argentina. By the time of his trial, Almirón had suffered a stroke and was unable to participate. The trial was suspended. He was held in detention and died in 2009.

== Early life ==
Almirón was born in 1936 in Puerto Bermejo, a small riverside town in Chaco Province, Argentina. He attended local schools. Afterward, he moved to Buenos Aires.

Around 1960, he joined the Argentine Federal Police (with jurisdiction over the city of Buenos Aires). Although a member of the robbery task force, Almirón became an associate of the "Prieto gang," which during the early 1960s was one of the most notorious in the Greater Buenos Aires area.

He and other policemen were indicted in 1964 for obstruction of justice in the murders of numerous Prieto gang members. Following Prieto's death in 1965 in a local jail, however, Almirón and his co-defendants were acquitted. Almirón was involved in the June 1964 death of a U.S. military officer, who was fatally shot during an altercation with the police officer outside a dance hall in Olivos, an upscale suburb of Buenos Aires. An acquaintance of Almirón's pleaded guilty to the shooting. Later, Almirón was determined to have committed the murder. In 1970, Almirón was dismissed from the Argentine Federal Police because of continuing criminal associations.

== Reinstatement ==
In 1973, José López Rega returned with Juan Perón to Argentina, who that year was elected as president. After being appointed as Minister of Social Welfare, López Rega reinstated Almirón in the federal police, along with his father-in-law, Commissioner José Ramón Morales. Almirón was assigned to López Rega's personal guard and that for Isabel Perón, who had been elected vice-president that year.

Also in 1973, López Rega became the political head and one of the founders of the Argentine Anticommunist Alliance, a right-wing death squad that became known as the Triple A. It was formed to operate against leftist Peronists, particularly the Peronist Youth and Montoneros guerrillas. Targets were increased to include opposition public officials such as police chiefs, judges and others. López Rega paid for its operations with cabinet funds from his department. He used Almirón as the chief operating officer of Triple A. It is estimated that Triple A killed 1500 people.

== Exile in Spain ==
In 1975, with public protests high against the economic plan called Rodrigazo, Isabel Perón appointed López Rega as ambassador plenipotentiary to Spain, and he took Almirón and Morales with him. A few months later, a military coup d'état overthrew Perón and installed the junta that ruled until 1983.

In Spain, Almirón became chief of personal security for Manuel Fraga Iribarne, former Francoist minister, Minister of the Interior in 1975–1976 and later leader of the People's Alliance and founder of the People's Party of Spain.

Almirón was present at the 1976 massacre in Montejurra, Spain of two left-wing Carlists, in which the Italian neofascist Stefano Delle Chiaie also participated. According to Spanish lawyer José Angel Pérez Nievas, it is "probable that Almirón participated — along with Stefano Delle Chiaie and Augusto Canchi — in the 1980 bombing of the Bologna train station" in Italy. On behalf of the Partido Carlista de Euskalherria-EKA and the Montejurra victims, Pérez asked a Spanish judge to have Almirón tried for the Montejurra murders.

In 1983, after the return of democratic government in Argentina, investigators tried to locate people responsible for abuses before and during the Dirty War. Almirón was found in Spain working for Manuel Fraga's security force. This caused such public indignation that Fraga dismissed the Argentinian. Almirón later served as a bodyguard to Spanish Prime Minister Felipe González and a training officer in the Spanish Presidential Guard. The Justice Minister of Spain, Alberto Ruiz Gallardón, sheltered Almirón by forbidding distribution of Cambio 16. This had published the location of Almirón, his activities, and close links to high-ranking Spanish politicians.

He was wanted by Argentina since 1984. His continued presence in Spain was kept secret for decades in order to protect the Popular Alliance, which was precursor to the current conservative Partido Popular. In 2006, Argentina was renewing efforts to prosecute persons responsible for human rights abuses, and Judge Norberto Oyarbide ruled that actions of the Triple A were crimes against humanity and exempt from the statute of limitations.

In December 2006, a reporter for El Mundo newspaper located Almirón living in Torrent, in a subsidized flat paid for by the Comunidad Valenciana region of Spain. He interviewed the former death squad leader on 17 December.

== Arrest and extradition ==
Almirón was arrested by the National Police in Torrent (Valencia), Spain on 29 December 2006, on murder charges under an Argentine extradition order, and returned to Argentina. The alleged death squad leader was charged specifically with the murders of Argentine Congressman Rodolfo Ortega Peña; former Buenos Aires Provincial Police assistant chief Julio Troxler; university professor Silvio Frondizi (brother of Arturo Frondizi, former Argentine President); and Professor Frondizi's son-in-law, Luis Ángel Mendiburu.

Almirón was the principal figure of Triple A to be tried by Argentina. Juan Perón, López Rega and Morales had died. In 2008 the administration of José Luis Rodríguez Zapatero had refused Argentina's extradition request for former President Isabel Perón, who had been living for decades in Spain.

By the time of the trial, Almirón had suffered a stroke that left him incapable of providing testimony or standing for cross-examination. His trial was suspended and he was kept in prison. He died in Buenos Aires Ramos Mejía Hospital on 5 June 2009.

== Personal life ==
Almirón was married twice. His first wife was the daughter of police commissioner José Ramón Morales, also part of the National Police and Triple A. After her death, Almirón married again in Spain.

== See also ==
- Manuel Fraga Iribarne
- Montejurra Incidents
- Dirty War
