= El abrazo (Madrid) =

Memorial in Madrid

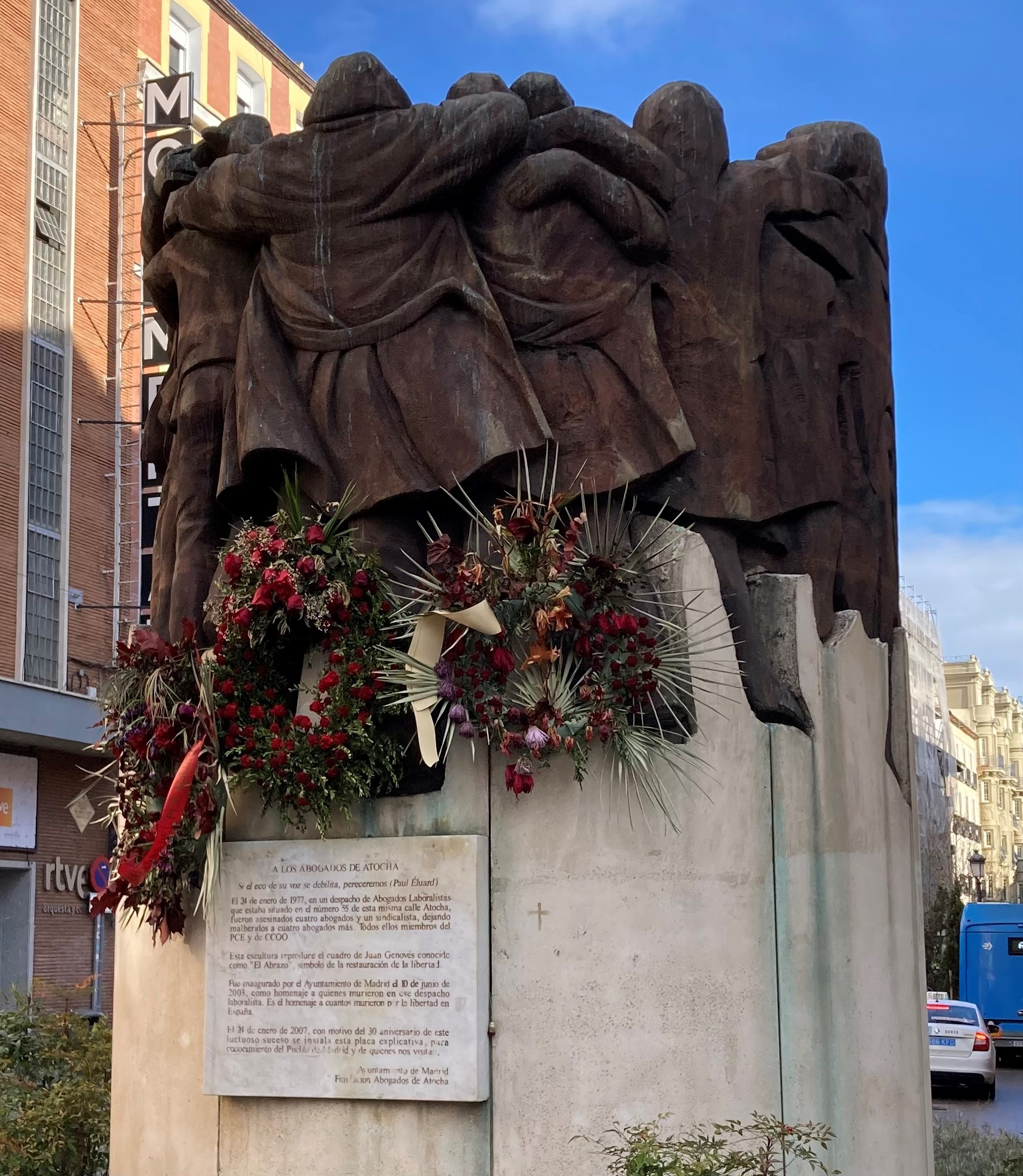
- 40.412412°N 3.699324°W
- Location: Plaza de Antón Martín, Madrid, Spain
- Designer: Juan Genovés
- Material: Bronze, stone
- Opening date: 10 June 2003; 21 years ago
- Dedicated to: Victims of the 1977 Atocha massacre

El abrazo ("the hug") or the Monument to the Atocha lawyers (Spanish: Monumento a los abogados de Atocha) is an instance of public art in Madrid, Spain. A three-dimensional rendering of Juan Genovés' painting of the same name, the sculpture serves as a memorial to the victims of the 1977 Atocha massacre, committed by the far-right.

== History and description ==
The monument was the initiative of the trade union federation Comisiones Obreras (CC.OO), who lobbied the Ayuntamiento de Madrid requesting the installation of a memorial to the victims of the 24 January 1977 attack, when four lawyers and a trade unionist linked to the Communist Party of Spain and the CC.OO were assassinated by neo-fascist gunmen (four others were seriously injured).

In November 2002, the Committee of Urban Aesthetics of the Ayuntamiento de Madrid approved the project, consisting of a bronze sculpture based on Juan Genovés' painting, depicting a circle of people united in a group embrace. The monument has a diameter of 3.5 metres and stands 4.0 metres high, with a base of white stone.

The memorial is a three-dimensional adaption of the famous painting El abrazo, which was commissioned in 1976 by the Democratic Junta of Spain and used during the Spanish Transition to propagate the demand for the release and amnesty of political prisoners. Genovés himself was arrested following printing of the original image and spent a week in prison.

Erected in the plaza de Antón Martín, metres from the location of the massacre (Calle de Atocha 55), the memorial was unveiled on 10 June 2003.

On 24 January 2007, on the occasion of the 30th anniversary of the Atocha massacre, a commemorative granite plaque was added to the lower part of the monument, reading "a los abogados de atocha: si el eco de su voz se debilita, pereceremos." ("To the lawyers of Atocha: If the echo of their voice weakens, we will perish"), adapted from a quote of a poem authored by Paul Éluard.
