= José Miguel Beñaran Ordeñana =

Basque militant and member of ETA (1949–1978)

José Miguel Beñaran Ordeñana

José Miguel Beñaran Ordeñana (1949 – 21 December 1978) was a Basque militant and a key figure in the political evolution of the Basque separatist organization Euskadi ta Askatasuna (ETA). Often known by his nom de guerre Argala (Slim), he took part in the so called Operation Ogre, which consisted in the assassination of Luis Carrero Blanco, Spain's Prime Minister, in 1973. Five years later, he was in turn assassinated by a car bomb in Anglet, French Basque Country, by a group directed by far right members inside the Spanish Navy (including an official of the SECED secret service and another of the Naval military intelligence agency, Servicio de Inteligencia Naval and the other belonging to the Alto Estado Mayor). This group reportedly received assistance from people such as former OAS member Jean Pierre Cherid, former Triple A Argentine member José María Boccardo and Italian neofascist Mario Ricci, member of Avanguardia Nazionale.

== Early life ==
Beñaran was born in Arrigorriaga, in Biscay, close to the industrialized city of Bilbao, but not far from Arratia, a valley with a typical Basque style of life. His mother, Felicidad Ordeñana Uriarte, was from Arantzazu. She was a Basque speaker, but only spoke Spanish at home. His father Pablo Beñaran Ormazabal was from Arrigorriaga. Though his father was a Basque nationalist, he could not speak Basque, even though his father was a Basque speaker. They had four children: Jose Miguel (1949), Maite (1951), Iñaki (1952) and Pablo (1955).

Beñaran grew up in two very different environments: the Francoist schools he was educated in and his Basque nationalist home. Workers strikes and police repression in the mid-1960s contributed to his concerns about the class system. He began studying Marxist theories at a young age. As Basque nationalism and cultural awareness grew stronger in the 1960s Beñaran enthusiastically participated in Basque language schools, festivals, and other cultural activities. In 1968, he joined the separatist group ETA with some friends. He began studying engineering, but he quit before finishing his studies and began working in a bank. He then began studying human sciences.

In May 1970, at the age of 21, Beñaran was forced to escape when the police noticed his involvement in ETA activities. He was reluctant to do so as both his parents were ill, with his father eventually dying that same year. He went to Oñati and a family gave him shelter there. He then took the nickname Iñaki, living in various locations over the next few years.

== Underground activity with ETA ==
In 1969, almost all of ETA's directorate board were arrested in Bilbao and Cantabria, and different discussions began inside the organization. At a subsequent meeting held in Itsasu, the organization split into three different groups: ETA V, ETA VI and Celulas Rojas.

At that time, Argala was member of the organization's cultural branch, the Cultural Front. He did not attend the meeting held in Itsasu, the Itsasu Assembly, and at first he remained with the Cultural Front within ETA VI. In December 1970, the Burgos trials (Proceso de Burgos) took place. On December 2, ETA V kidnapped the German consul, Behil in San Sebastián. ETA VI then organized Operación Botella, an operation to break out prisoners. Argala joined the operation, which involved digging tunnels into the prison. While the tunnels managed to reach under the building, they failed to succeed, as they failed to break the prison walls.

Argala joined ETA V in January 1971. They were a small group that made their ideology very clear. Argala helped militants like Txomin Iturbe and Eustakio Mendizabal build a theory based on Marxist theories, while stressing Basque national values. He spent some time in Paris undertaking organizing tasks and then he went back to Biscay as leader of the Cultural Front. He divided his life between the towns of Eibar and Elgoibar. However, the fact that he was involved in the Cultural Front did not keep him from taking part in the Military Front. On 30 September 1971, he participated in the assault of Banco de Vizcaya together with Eustakio Mendizabal and some other members, getting away with 10 million pesetas.

In 1971, ETA began setting up hideouts in Madrid, where they could contact some other left-wing groups, with a view to establishing an anonymous and safe rearguard and creating a local armed cell in Madrid. Argala made many trips to the Francoist state's capital. They shelved the idea of creating a local armed group in the short term, and instead began to consider staging attacks themselves in Madrid. It was here that Argala made his first contacts with Alfonso Sastre and Eva Forest.

== Further actions ==
On 19 January 1972, an ETA group formed by Txomin Iturbe, Mikel Lujua, Tomas Perez Revilla and Argala kidnapped the businessman Lorenzo Zabala Suinaga in Abadiño, Biscay. The workers of the company Precicontrol were on strike, with some of them, including some friends of Argala, on a hunger strike in the church of Eibar. ETA wanted to support labour conditions and turned their attention to the workers' demands. They declared that if the company's management did not meet their workers' demands, they would kill Zabala on 28 January. The demands were satisfied and Zabala was freed on 22 January.

In October 1972, ETA V organized an assembly to clarify each faction's position and to try to reunite them as a single organization. The meeting was meant to be in Hasparren, in the Northern Basque Country. Argala and some other members of the Cultural Front, decided not to cross the Spanish-French border out of concern for their own safety. The Guardia Civil had spotted the group Argala was supposed to join and opened fire on them. Jonan Aranguren, known as Iharra, was killed, but the rest of the group managed to escape. Missing a meeting was considered a breach of discipline, so Argala and Ignacio Pérez Beotegui, known as "Wilson" were stripped of all responsibilities in the organization. The assembly issued a ban on both militants from setting foot in Southern Basque Country or from undertaking any politically related work.

As a result of this ban, Argala and Wilson were forced to relocate to Madrid. They obtained information about Luis Carrero Blanco, planning to kidnap him in exchange for the freedom of all imprisoned Basque activists. More militants joined them in Madrid and by May 1973 plans were complete to carry out the kidnapping. Due to various problems, the kidnapping was delayed. Later on, ETA member Eustakio Mendizabal, aka "Txikia", was killed in Algorta, forcing the organization's directorate to delay the abduction. From that moment on, the Madrid group was called the Commando Txikia. Carrero Blanco was appointed prime minister of the Spanish government and undertook more security measures. With the difficulties in kidnapping Carrero Blanco Argala's group tried to kidnap the Secretary of Trade Alberto Ullastres, but he was away when a cell formed by ETA members came up in his house on 7 November.

Argala and his group began plotting to kill Carrero Blanco instead, in what would be known as Operación Ogro. The Commando Txikia also considered other options: killing Manuel Fraga, killing Alfredo Semprún and breaching the walls of the Segovia prison to break out anti-Franco prisoners. On 25 September, they attacked a government arms store to obtain explosives, scattering propaganda of an invented revolutionary group as a distraction. On 20 December 1973, posing as workmen, members of the cell triggered the bomb that went off in a tunnel under the Madrid street as the car of Carrero Blanco passed by on his way home from Mass. Franco's right-hand man initially survived the attack, though he later died in hospital, while his chauffeur and bodyguard were also killed. Argala was the only ETA member able to identify the mysterious man who gave Carrero Blanco's schedule and itinerary to ETA.

== Assassination ==
He was arrested several times in the French Basque Country between 1975 and 1977, and confined to different French regions by French authorities. However, he was released and by 1978 he lived in Anglet. By then Argala was a charismatic leader of ETA (m), with the PNV historic figure Telesforo Monzon calling him in the Txiberta talks, where a possible Basque nationalist collaboration was discussed and eventually ruled out. However, the Spanish home office was targeting him and tracked him down, as declared by mercenaries who were being used to execute the Government's policy in the French Basque Country. Argala was assassinated by a car bomb on 21 December 1978 in the town of Anglet, in the French Basque Country.

According to "Leonidas", a former member of the Spanish Army involved in the bombing against Argala, "the explosives came from a North American base. I don't remember exactly whether they were from Torrejón de Ardoz or Rota, but I do know that the Americans did not know what they would be used for. It was a personal favor to Pedro el Marino" (referring to Pedro Martínez, who provided the explosives). The device was planted by a Guardia Civil captain. Responsibility for Argala's assassination was claimed by the Batallón Vasco Español (BVE). According to Leonidas, however, "BVE, ATE and Triple A are only acronyms", used to suit each situation.

== See also ==
- Operation Ogre
- Luis Carrero Blanco
- Spanish transition to democracy
