= Yolanda González (activist) =

Spanish militant (1961–1980)

- Born: 20 January 1961
- Died: 1 February 1980 (aged 19)
- Cause of death: Murder
- Occupation: Student
- Organization: Worker's Socialist Party (Spain)

Yolanda González Martín (20 January 1961 – 1 February 1980) was a Spanish student and communist militant murdered by two members of New Force.

== Biography ==
Originally from Deusto, Bilbao, González moved to Madrid to study electronics. To fund her education, she worked as a cleaner. She became the student representative of the vocational training school where she studied. She was also a member of the Workers Socialist Party. In February 1980, she was kidnapped, tortured and murdered by some members of New Force. Her body was found on a roadside near Madrid. The organization Batallón Vasco Español claimed responsibility for her murder. On the same day the organisation also murdered Jesús María Zubikarai Badiola in Eibar.

The perpetrators of González' murder were Emilio Hellín and Ignacio Abad Velázquez, who were arrested and sentenced to prison terms. Hellin was sentenced to 43 years in prison, of which he served only 14. In February 2013, El País reported that Hellin, under a false name, was working in communications technology for the Spanish security forces.

== Legacy ==
On multiple anniversary years of her murder, González' relatives and neighbours have led calls for further justice and reparation. In 2014 Isabel Rodríguez directed the documentary "Yolanda en el País de los estudiantes", which recounts the kidnapping and subsequent murder of González by the Batallón Vasco-Español.

In 2018 Carlos Fonseca wrote No te olvides de mí: Yolanda González, el crimen más brutal de la Transición. This book brought together a range of sources to focus on her murder.

Both a garden and a public square have been named in her honour. In 2015, the garden Jardines de Yolanda González Martín was named after her in Madrid. In 2018 the sign for the gardens was defaced by fascists. In 2016 there a small square in Deustu was named in her honour.

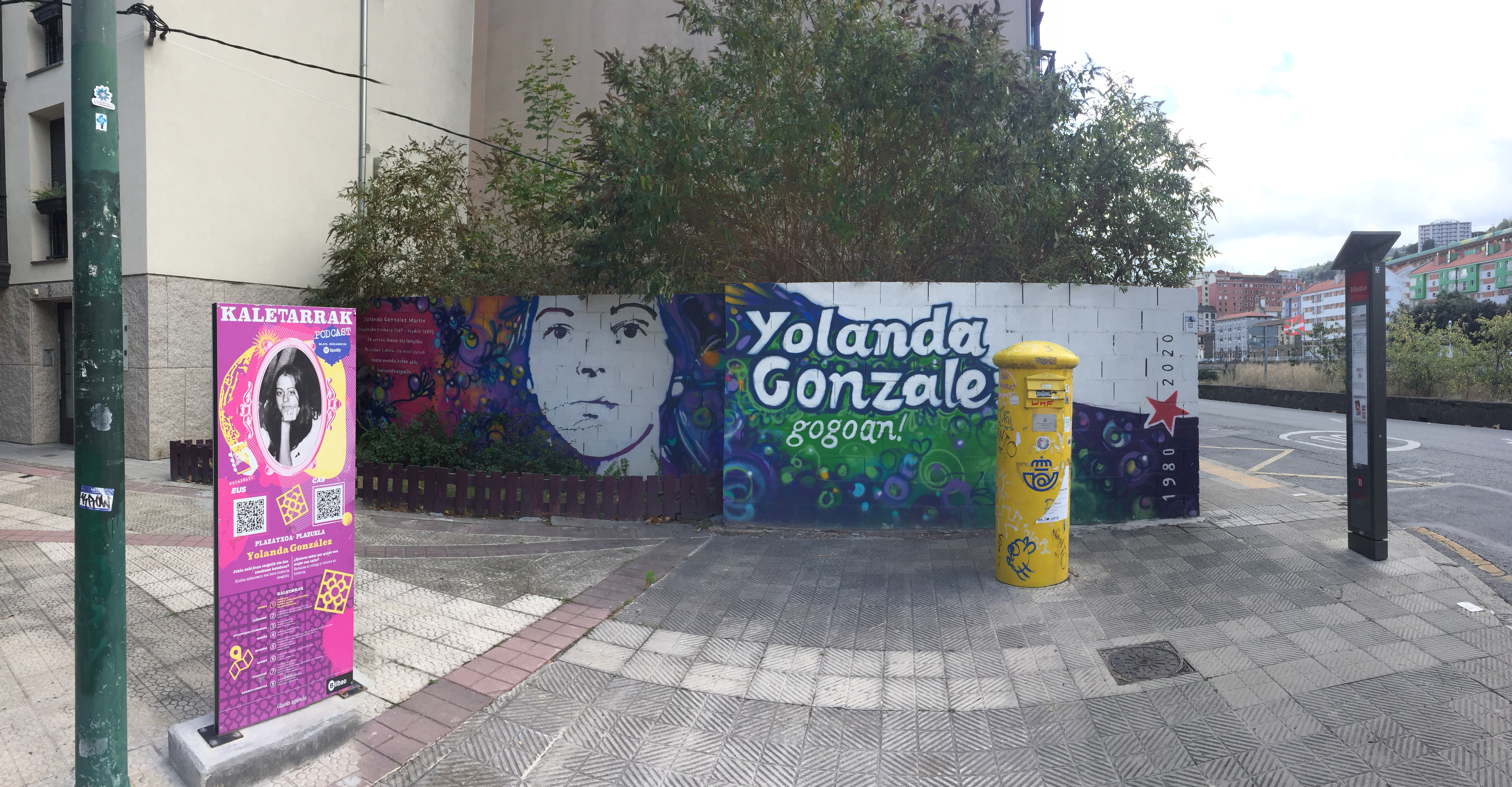
Square in Deustu, Bilbao

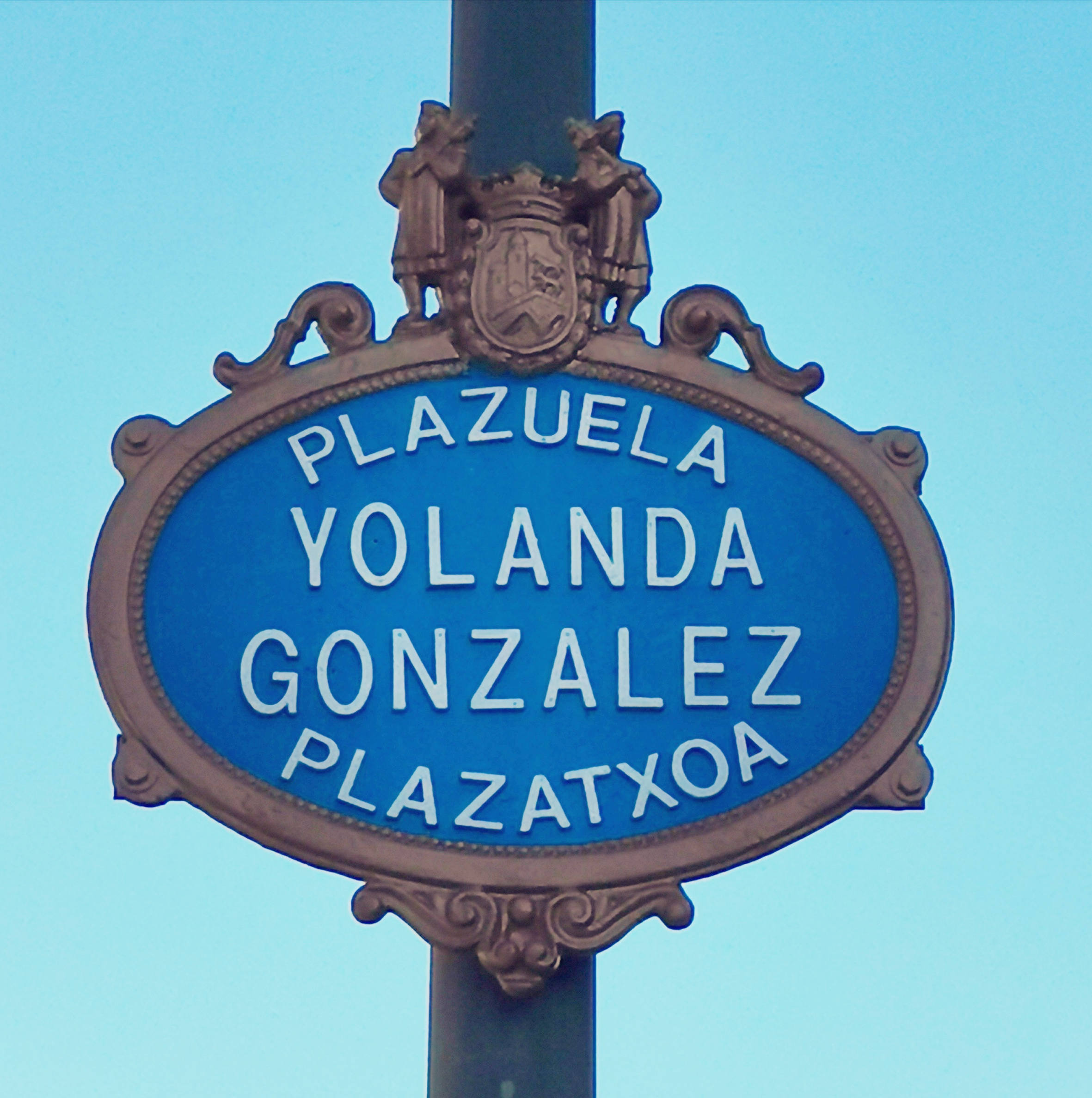
Deustu sign

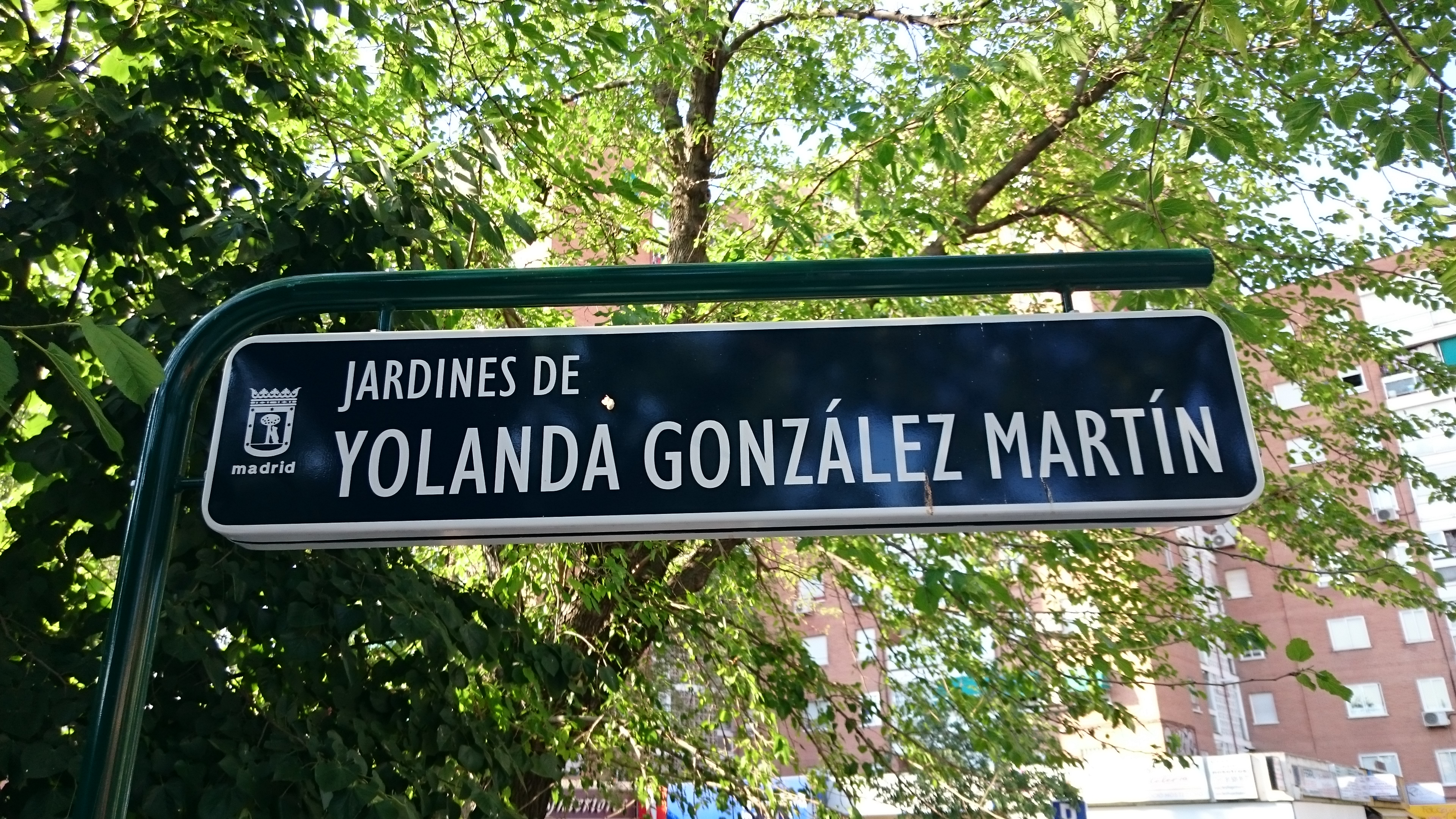
Gardens in Madrid
