= Jean-Pierre Cherid =

French politician (1940–1984)

Jean-Pierre Cherid (November 20, 1940, in Algiers – March 19, 1984, in Biarritz, France) was a far right French activist and later mercenary of Moroccan descent. A former French paratrooper, he first became a member of the Organisation armée secrète (OAS) during the Algerian War (1954–1962). In 1962, he was arrested and sentenced to 30 years in prison. However, in 1964, he escaped from prison and fled to Spain. He was detained in Barcelona, but quickly released. Cherid later fought as a mercenary in the Nigerian Civil War in Biafra, after which he returned to Spain.

Cherid was one of the far-right mercenaries hired by Spanish secret services, then part of SECED to take part in the 1976 Montejurra massacre against left-wing Carlist Party. After that, Cherid remained related to the members of the intelligence services belonging to the Spanish secret services and security forces that organized an illegal war against ETA in the French Basque Country, under different denominations (Antiterrorismo ETA, Batallón Vasco Español or AAA death squads) during Union of the Democratic Centre administrations. He took part in the 1978 assassination of Argala, a prominent member of ETA who had participated in the 1973 assassination of Francisco Franco's Prime minister and appointed successor Luis Carrero Blanco. This time, however, no organization claimed responsibility for the killing. In 1979, he led a squad that attempted unsuccessfully to murder an ETA activist, Txomin, in Biarritz. Some months later, his squad murdered another ETA activist, Enrique Álvarez, "Korta", in Bayonne. On December 31, 1980, Cherid killed ETA member José Martín Sagardía in Biarritz. This time, the BVE claimed responsibility for the assassination.

The change of administration in Spain in 1982 did not affect his collaboration with underground dirty war efforts against ETA and therefore with the Grupos Antiterroristas de Liberación (GAL), the new denomination of the state-sponsored death squads that operated in France during the Spanish Socialist Workers' Party administration in Spain. Cherid died on March 19, 1984, in an explosion which happened during the manipulation of explosives destined to attempt to assassinate the ETA's executive committee. An authorization belonging to the Guardia Civil information services was found among his remains.

In 1996, during the Spanish Parliament special commission on the dirty war, it was revealed that Cherid's family applied for a pension from the Spanish Ministry of Interior. Álvaro Martínez Sevilla, Spanish United Left senator claimed that former Spanish Interior Minister José Barrionuevo (later condemned for his implication in a kidnapping carried out by the GAL) ordered that Cherid's widow receive a life pension. The minister denied having done so.

In 2008, Cherid was accused of involvement in the 1976 disappearance of ETA activist Pertur, sometimes attributed to fellow members of the organization. According to the testimony of an Italian neofascist, Cherid managed a house outside Barcelona where death squads tortured kidnapped people on behalf of the Spanish intelligence services.
