= Norberto Mario Oyarbide =

Argentinian judge and lawyer (1951–2021)

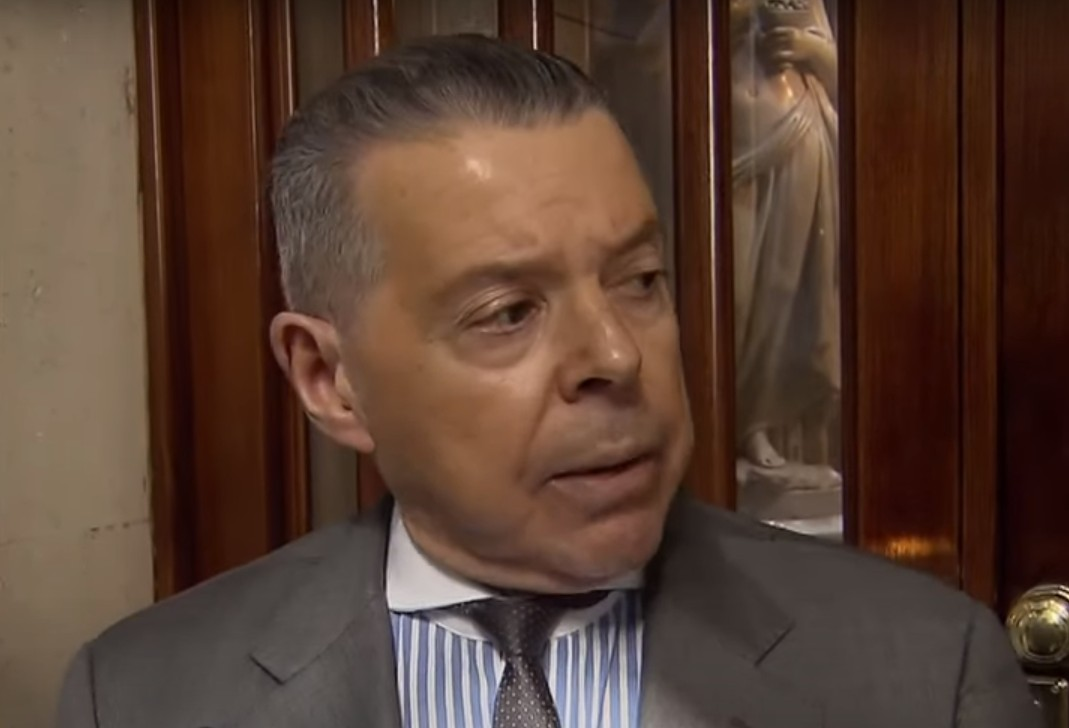

Personal details
- Born: 1 January 1951; Concepción del Uruguay, Argentina
- Died: 1 September 2021 (aged 70); Buenos Aires, Argentina

Norberto Oyarbide (1 January 1951 – 1 September 2021) was an Argentine judge.

== Career ==
Oyarbride served as a Justice of the Federal Chamber of Crime of Argentina from 1994 till his retirement in 2016.

== Personal life and death ==
He lived with his husband, Claudio Alonso. Oyarbride died from complications of COVID-19 in September 2021.
