= Warriors of Christ the King =

Spanish far-right paramilitary organization

- Guerrilleros de Cristo Rey (Spanish)
- Leader: Mariano Sánchez Covisa (denied)
- Dates active: c. 1968 – c. 1980
- Active regions: Spain (Basque Country, Madrid)
- Ideology: Neo-fascism; Traditionalism; Spanish nationalism; National Catholicism
- Political position: Far-right
- Status: Inactive
- Size: Unknown
- Wars: Basque conflict

The Guerrilleros de Cristo Rey (English: Warriors of Christ the King, GCR) was a far-right paramilitary organisation active in the late 1970s in Spain, primarily in the Basque Country and Madrid.

== History ==
The group emerged at a time of factionism within the Carlist movement. Historically Carlism was a traditionalist, legitimist and Catholic movement, supporting a different monarchical line to the one occupying the Spanish throne.

Under the leadership of Carlos Hugo, the group began to support a left-wing, social democrat ideology under the banner of the Carlist Party. This caused large-scale conflict within the movement; many proclaimed his more traditionalist-minded brother, Sixtus Henry, as Carlist regent. Probably the most notable incident involving the group was the Montejurra massacre of 1976, which happened during the annual Carlist pilgrimage to the Montejurra mountain in Navarre. During this attack, two supporters of the Carlos Hugo faction (Ricardo García Pellejero and Aniano Jiménez Santo) were killed. José Luis Marín García Verde and Hermenegildo García Llorente, alleged members of this armed group, were arrested later, but were later released without investigation as Manuel Fraga (Member of Franco's political board) gave direct instructions not to prosecute these murders. The presence of known European Fascist criminals, active in organisations such as Batallón Vasco Español or Alianza Apostólica Anticomunista and Italy in this has led to some speculating a link to the Cold War-era Operation Gladio.

== Attacks ==
Attacks attributed to the Warriors of Christ the King: (Note: This list may be incomplete, because many of their attacks were never claimed. Additionally the acronyms GCR and others (Antiterrorismo ETA, Primera Línea de Fuerza Nueva, Batallón Vasco Español, Grupos Armados Españoles, Alianza Apóstolica Anticomunista, and later Grupos Antiterroristas de Liberación and GANE) seem to have been indistinctly used by the same Spanish nationalist networks capriciously.)

- December 1970: Members of the organisation beat various progressive priests in Ondarroa.
- January 1972: The group vandalized the protective bollards outside the Beit Yaacov synagogue in Madrid, spray painting slogans such as "Death to the Jews,” “Synagogue, Judaism, Danger,” “Out with the traitors” and “Long live Catholic unity."
- 2 May 1973: Mariano Sánchez Covisa (leader of the organisation) was arrested for attacking a mass organised by the Movimientos Apostólicos Obreros de Madrid.
- 9 May 1976: During Montejurra massacre members of the organisation were related to the violent actions that took place, along with other terrorist organisations.
- 26 September 1976: The group assassinated 21-year-old student Carlos González Martínez, who was attending a protest of tribute to the last persons executed by Francoist dictatorship in Madrid.
- 23 January 1977: Members of the organisation assassinated 19-year-old Arturo Ruiz (member of the Young Red Guard, the youth wing of the Party of Labour of Spain) in Madrid.
- 24 August 1978: The group burned the headquarters of the Basque nationalist and anarchist magazine Askatasuna.
