= Joaquín Morales Solá =

Argentine political journalist

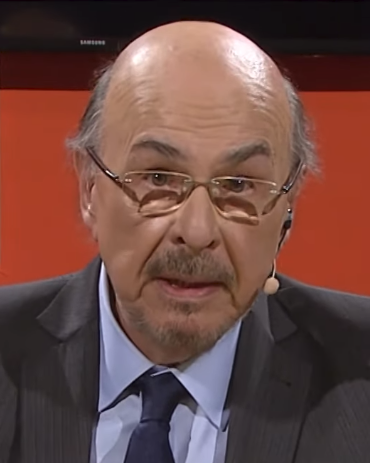
Joaquín Morales Solá, 2019

Joaquín Morales Solá (born 1950) is an Argentine political journalist. Since 2003 he started working for news television channel Todo Noticias and since 1993 he became a political columnist for the conservative newspaper La Nación.

== Biography ==
Morales Solá was born in Tucumán. He began his career in journalism at age 18, working for a prominent local newspaper, La Gaceta de Tucumán, and at 20 he became a correspondent at the Buenos Aires-based daily Clarín.

He studied at the School of Law of the National University of Tucumán, and later attended courses on Social Communication at Harvard University.

== Clarín and La Nación ==
In 1975 he moved to Buenos Aires and started working for Clarín. It summoned him to be deputy secretary of the Political section. For 12 years he was second editor in chief and author of the Sunday political column of that newspaper.

Between 1992 and 1993 he was the main political columnist for Noticias magazine.

He resigned from Clarín, and in 1993 he became a political columnist for the conservative newspaper La Nación.

== TV ==
He was a political columnist for the Telefé newscast and Bernardo Neustadt's "Tiempo Nuevo" program. During 1997, he hosted "Dos en la noticias" along with Magdalena Ruiz Guiñazú, on the former Channel 9. He hosts the television program "Desde el llano" on the Todo Noticias channel.

== Works ==
He has published many books as Asalto a la ilusión (1991) and El sueño eterno (2002). In his latest book, "Sin excusas", Morales Solá reveals dialogues with former vice president Chacho Alvarez, about the secret plot of bribes in the Senate, the causes of his resignation and the mistakes that led to the failure of the Alliance.

== Awards ==
In 1990, the Italian government awarded him the Order of Merit of the Italian Republic. Later, in 1992, Spain distinguished him with the Order of Isabella the Catholic. In 1998, he received the National Order of Merit awarded by France.

He received the Communication and Journalism Platinum Konex Award in 1987, 1997 and 2007.

He is member of the National Academy of Journalism.

== Editorial stance ==
Since 2003, he has been an opponent of Kirchnerism from La Nación (newspaper) and Todo Noticias (television).
