= Batallón Vasco Español =

Spanish terrorist group

Spanish Basque Battalion
- Batallón Vasco Español (Spanish)
- Leader: Unknown
- Dates active: July 1975 – April 1981
- Active regions: France (French Basque Country); Spain (Basque Country)
- Ideology: Anti-communism; Neo-fascism; Spanish nationalism
- Political position: Far-right
- Status: Inactive
- Size: Unknown
- Wars: Basque conflict

The Batallón Vasco Español (BVE) (English: Spanish Basque Battalion), sometimes associated with the Alianza Apostólica Anticomunista (AAA) (English: Anti-Communist Apostolic Alliance), Antiterrorismo ETA (English: ETA Antiterrorism) or Triple A (English: Triple A), was a Spanish neo-fascist parapolice organization present mainly in the Basque Country and Southern France. It began operations in 1975, a year and a half after the murder of Luis Carrero Blanco by ETA and disbanded by April 1981. Some of its former members joined an organization formed not long after, known as the Grupos Antiterroristas de Liberación. The use of violence by the BVE was reported by ETA and its allies, who identified it as violence committed directly by the Spanish government against the Basque population. Manuel Fraga, former interior minister who was in office when the BVE was formed, defended it by saying it was a group of mayors who self-defended because ETA was going after them but had no influence in the course of the events.

== Attacks ==
Attacks attributed to the Spanish Basque Battalion: (Note: This list may be incomplete, because many of their attacks were never claimed. Additionally the acronyms BVE and others (Guerrilleros de Cristo Rey, Antiterrorismo ETA, Primera Línea de Fuerza Nueva, Grupos Armados Españoles, Alianza Apóstolica Anticomunista, and later Grupos Antiterroristas de Liberación and GANE) seem to have been indistinctly used by the same Spanish nationalist networks capriciously.)

- 24 May 1978: Claimed assassination of José Martín Merquelanz Sarriegui, taxi driver from Irún, for allegedly helping an ETA militant escape. This assassination was originally attributed to ETA, but the organisation denied it.
- 21 December 1978: Assassination of José Miguel Beñarán, "Argala" (ETA militant who participated in the assassination of Luis Carrero Blanco in 1973), in Anglet. Carlos Gastón, member of the BVE was accused for this crime. Former OAS member Jean-Pierre Cherid took part in it.
- 25 June 1979: Assassination of Enrique Gómez Álvarez (alleged ETA militant) in Bayonne.
- 28 June 1979: Assassination of F. Martín Eizaguirre and Aurelio Fernández (alleged GRAPO militants) in Paris.
- 2 August 1979: Assassination of Juan J. Lopategui Carrasco (ETA militant) in Anglet.
- 28 September 1979: Assassination of Tomás Alba Irazusta, HB councillor, in his hometown of Astigarraga.
- 2 February 1980: Assassination of Jesús María Zubigaray Badiola, member of Euskadiko Ezkerra, in Hernani.
- 2 February 1980: Kidnapping and assassination of Yolanda González Martín (student and member of the Workers' Socialist Party) in Madrid. Members of Fuerza Nueva were arrested for this case, including a policeman.
- 19 April 1980: Claimed assassination of Felipe Sagarna Ormazábal, member of HB in Hernani.
- 8 May 1980: Assassination of María José Bravo del Barrio (student without known political relation) in San Sebastián.
- 11 June 1980: José Miguel Etxeberria killed in Ziburu.
- 30 August 1980: Assassination of Angel Etxaniz Olabarria, member of Herri Batasuna, in Ondarroa.
- 7 September 1980: Assassination of Miguel María Arbelaiz and Luis María Elizondo (HB members) in Hernani.
- 14 November 1980: Assassination of Esperanza Arana and Joaquín Alfonso Etxeberria (ETA militants) in Caracas.
- 14 November 1980: Assassination of Joaquín Antimasbere Escoz, a Gypsy scrap dealer (with no known political connection), in Hernani.
- 23 November 1980: Machine-gun attack against the Bar Hendayais in Hendaye. José Camio and Jean Pierre Aramendi (both without known political connections) were killed. Another 10 people were injured.
- 30 December 1980: Assassination of José Martín Sagardía Zaldua (ETA member) in Biarritz.
- 3 March 1981: Assassination of Francisco Javier Ansa Cincunegui, HB member, in Andoain.
- 23 April 1981: Assassination of Xavier Aguirre in Paris.
