= Triple A (Spain) =

Spanish far-right paramilitary organisation

Anti-Communist Apostolic Alliance
- Alianza Apostólica Anticomunista (Spanish)
- Leader: Unknown
- Dates active: c. 1976 – c. 1983
- Active regions: Spain (Basque Country, Catalonia); France (French Basque Country)
- Ideology: Spanish nationalism National Catholicism; Catholic fundamentalism Anti-Catalanism
- Political position: Far-right
- Status: Inactive
- Size: Unknown
- Wars: Basque conflict

The Alianza Apostólica Anticomunista (English: Anti-Communist Apostolic Alliance) was a Spanish far-right paramilitary organisation active from 1976 to 1983, primarily in the southern Basque Country but also in the French Basque Country and Barcelona.

A June 2010 report by the Office for Victims of Terrorism of the Basque Government attributed eight murders with 66 deathly victims to the group and linked it to the National Police Corps, SECED and the Civil Guard.

The group attacked the satirical magazine El Papus in Barcelona, killing one person and injuring 17.

== Attacks ==
Attacks claimed by the Anti-Communist Apostolic Alliance: (Note: This list may be incomplete, because many attacks were never admitted. The acronyms GAE and others (Guerrilleros de Cristo Rey, Antiterrorismo ETA, Primera Línea de Fuerza Nueva, Batallón Vasco Español, Grupos Armados Españoles, and later Grupos Antiterroristas de Liberación and GANE) seem to have been used by the same Spanish nationalist networks.)

- 27 July 1976: The group claimed responsibility for kidnapping ETA political-military leader Pertur. The Batallón Vasco Español later claimed responsibility for kidnapping and murdering Pertur. Rivals in ETA (pm) have also been suspected.
- 16 December 1976: The group threatened Catalan singer Lluis Llach, attacking with machine guns at one of his concerts.
- 25 January 1977: Triple A claimed responsibility for the Atocha massacre (later proven false) and the bombing of the Pub Santa Bárbara.
- 7 February 1977: The Sala Villaroel in Barcelona was bombed during a performance of an Alfonso Sastre play; the theatre owner was wounded.
- 17 February 1977: The Triple A Francisco Franco Command sent death threats to journalists and Basque activists.
- 21 February 1977: A death threat was sent to José Luis Martín, dean of arts at the University of Salamanca.
- 24 February 1977: A death threat was sent to Adolfo Suárez, accusing him of treason against the National Movement.
- 27 May 1977: A bomb threat was made against an Aranjuez cinema if a People's Socialist Party event scheduled to be held there was not canceled.
- 20 September 1977: A bomb exploded at the satirical magazine El Papus office in Barcelona. Juan Peñalver Sandoval was killed, and 17 people were injured. The group also threatened to attack the publications Cambio 16 and Mundo Diario and the magazine Por Favor.
- 6 October 1977: A bomb destroyed the offices of the magazine Punto y Hora de Euskal Herria in Pamplona.
- 7 October 1977: Taxi driver David Salvador Bernardo (Jonio) was murdered in Andoain, Gipuzkoa. Triple A claimed responsibility for Salvador Bernardo's murder, accusing him of being an ETA collaborator.
- 5 November 1977: Triple A attacked and robbed the headquarters of Comisiones Obreras in Bilbao.
- 6 June 1978: Death threats were sent to Diario 16 manager Miguel Ángel Aguilar.
- 1 July 1978: A bomb partially destroyed the Circulo Catalán de Madrid building, killing one person.
- 2 July 1978: Rosario Arregui Letamendi, the wife of former ETA military leader Juan José Etxabe, was murdered in Donibane Lohizune, France. The couple was shot while they were driving; Letamendi died at the scene, and Etxabe was seriously wounded. Etxabe's family had been attacked several times, and his brother was murdered three years before. Responsibility was claimed by the Triple A, in "retaliation for the latest developments in Euskadi". Five unknown assailants opened fire at Letamendi's funeral.
- 13 September 1978: The PSOE offices in Avilés were attacked with guns, and the group stole a statue of Francisco Franco.
- 10 November 1978: A Molotov cocktail was used to attack Comisiones Obreras headquarters in Madrid.
- 5 May 1979: Triple A announced a boycott of the Basque Country.
- 6 May 1979: 17-year-old José Ramón Ansa Echevarria of Andoain, Gipuzkoa, was kidnapped and murdered at dawn as he returned home on foot after attending local festivities with friends. Ansa Echevarria was found with a bullet in his forehead in a roadside ditch between Andoain and Urnieta. Responsibility for his murder was claimed by Triple A, who accused him of being a member of ETA (an accusation denied by his family).
- 11 May 1979: A bomb destroyed the Socialist Party of Andalusia building in Seville.
- 12 June 1979: A bomb destroyed the UCD building in Granada.
- 23 April 1980: Basque painter and Euskadiko Ezkerra member Javier Aguirre Unamuno was severely injured in an attack.
- 23 July 1980: A 2-kilogram (4.4 lb) Goma-2 bomb exploded in the Ametzola neighborhood of Bilbao. In the explosion, two Roma died at the scene: Maria Contreras Gabarra, 17 (who was pregnant) and her brother, 12-year-old Antonio Contreras Gabarra. 59-year-old Anastasio Leal Terradillos of Cabezuela del Valle, an employee of the municipal cleaning service, was fatally injured. After the attack, there was speculation about whether the intended target was a nearby nursery owned by a councillor of Herri Batasuna or the local Batzoki.
- 27 August 1980: Jesús Maria Etxebeste was murdered in Irun.
- 19 December 1980: A bar in Lekeitio was attacked.
- 26 November 1981: El Diario de Barcelona was attacked. Death threats against Xavier Vinader.
- 2 January 1982: Pablo Garayalde was murdered in Leitza.
- 14 June 1982: Four bombs in Madrid and attacks on two buses in Torremolinos.
- 5 February 1983: A grenade attack on the US Embassy in Madrid.
- 11 February 1983: Attacks on, and threats against, left-wing students in the University of Barcelona.
