= Assassination of Pedro Eugenio Aramburu =

1970 murder in Argentina

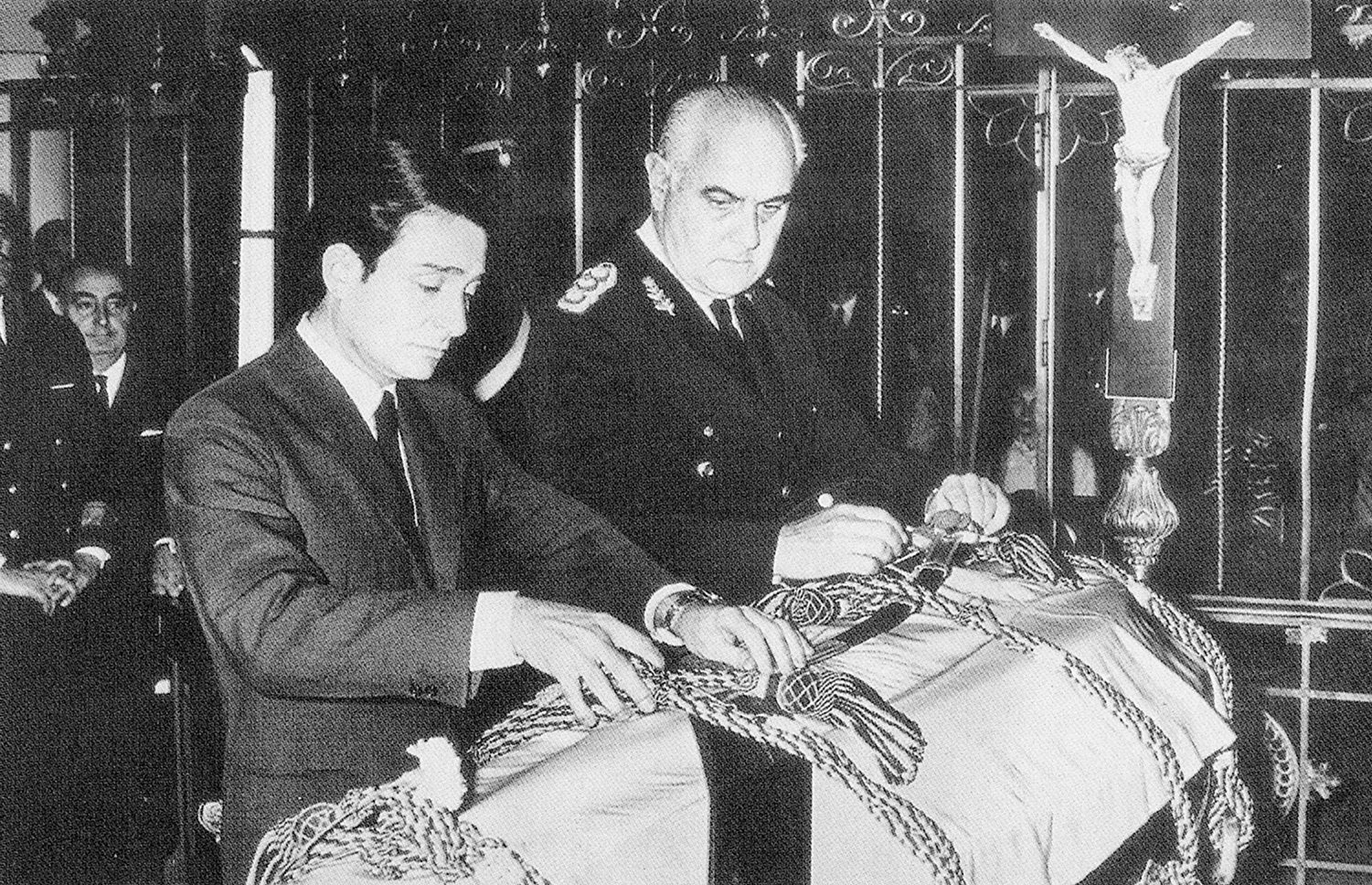
- Aramburu's son with Alejandro Lanusse during Aramburu's funeral
- Location: Timote, Carlos Tejedor Partido, Argentina
- Date: 1 June 1970; 56 years ago 7 am
- Target: Pedro Eugenio Aramburu
- Attack type: Assassination by firearm (extrajudicial execution)
- Perpetrator: Montoneros
- Motive: Revenge for the 1956 execution of Juan José Valle, kidnapping of Eva Perón's body, among others

Former de facto President of Argentina Pedro Eugenio Aramburu was killed by his captors on 1 June 1970, three days after being kidnapped by members of the far-left guerrilla Montoneros.

== Background ==
A lieutenant general of the Argentine Army, Aramburu had taken part in the Revolución Libertadora which overthrew President Juan Perón in September 1955. After taking over the government, the military established a civic-military dictatorship with the head of the putsch, Eduardo Lonardi, being named President of Argentina. Aramburu quickly rose to power, replacing Lonardi in November 1955, as Lonardi developed conflicts with other military officers.

During his three-year tenure until May 1958, Aramburu brutally repressed Peronist militants. He also ordered the execution by firing squad of general Juan José Valle for leading a rebellion against his government in 1956. A fervent opponent of Perón, Aramburu unsuccessfully ran for president in the 1963 Argentine general election, finishing third, with Arturo Umberto Illia becoming president.

However, the fragile democratic government of Illia was heavily influenced by the military and the censorship of Peronist activities and its leadership. The fragility eventually led to the 1966 coup led by General Juan Carlos Onganía and the restoration of military government in the country.

== Kidnapping and assassination ==
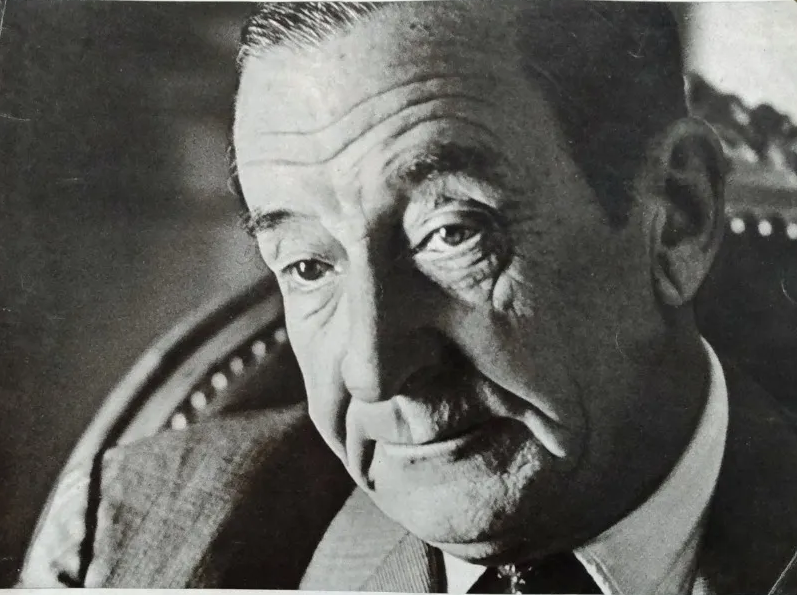
Aramburu in 1970

By 1970, Aramburu's name resonated as a potential candidate for the 1973 presidential election. Meanwhile, members of Montoneros, a growing far-left guerrilla organization in Argentina, had secretly planned Operation Pindapoy, named after a company that produced citrus juices, to abduct Aramburu.

At noon on 29 May 1970, two Montoneros members, posing as young military officers in the role of bodyguards, gained access to Aramburu's apartment in Buenos Aires, kidnapping the 67-year-old Aramburu and covertly taking him to a farmhouse in the small settlement of Timote in Carlos Tejedor Partido of Buenos Aires Province. The same day the Montoneros announced that the Unit Command Juan José Valle (Note: The group's choosing of Valle's name for the unit in charge of the operation against Aramburu was influenced by one of the operation's motives: avenging General Valle's execution in 1956 on the orders of then-President Aramburu.) had carried out the operation and that the militia had opened a "revolutionary trial" of Aramburu for various crimes, including the massacre of twelve civilians in General San Martín Partido and the kidnapping of Eva Perón's body.

Two days after the kidnapping the Aramburu family asked the Curia to act as intermediary in dealing with the kidnappers. That same day the wife of Aramburu visited Onganía in the Casa Rosada to ask him not to be intransigent—as he had been a few months earlier when a group known as the Argentine Liberation Front demanded the release of two prisoners after kidnapping the Paraguayan consul stationed in the town of Ituzaingó—since the kidnappers were not demanding anything in exchange for Aramburu.

Onganía was noncommittal, since the Montoneros had declared in one of their communiqués that "the nature of the charges against General Aramburu is such that the possibility of negotiating his release with the regime is completely out of the question." Dissatisfied with his response Mrs. Arumburu approached Alejandro Agustín Lanusse, the Commander-in-Chief of the Argentine Army and a rival of Onganía, who agreed to negotiate with the kidnappers.

The next day, however, the Montoneros released a communiqué announcing that Aramburu had been executed. Aramburu had been shot four times on 1 June 1970 at 7 a.m. by Montonero member Fernando Abal Medina; Mario Firmenich and Abal Medina's romantic partner Esther Norma Arrostito also participated in the execution.

== Reactions and consequences ==
The kidnapping of former President Aramburu disturbed Argentine society. After the Montoneros announced the "revolutionary trial" of Aramburu, anger began to grow within the military prompted by the indifference of President Onganía.

President Onganía condemned the killing and said that Argentina was at war with a fringe group of foreigners seeking to sink the country into chaos and anarchy. He subsequently issued a decree on 2 June reinstating capital punishment in Argentina.

Ultimately, Aramburu's death led to the overthrow of de facto President Onganía. The Junta's Commanders removed him from office on 7 June 1970, with Roberto Marcelo Levingston being appointed as his successor.

In the following weeks, Montoneros published various statements in the media, claiming responsibility for the killing and saying that it had been in retaliation for numerous actions attributed to the military and, specifically, to President Aramburu. Among those causes cited by Montoneros was the execution of Juan José Valle. In addition, Montoneros published the verdict of the "court", which was published in Argentine media:

― En el día de la fecha, domingo 31 de mayo de 1970, la conducción de nuestra organización, constituida en Tribunal Revolucionario, luego de interrogar detenidamente a Pedro Eugenio Aramburu resuelve:
- 1.º. Condenar a Pedro Eugenio Aramburu a ser pasado por las armas en lugar y fecha a determinar.
- 2.º. Hacer conocer oportunamente la documentación que fundamenta la resolución de este Tribunal.
- 3.º. Dar cristiana sepultura a los restos del acusado, que solo serán restituidos a sus familiares cuando al Pueblo Argentino le sean devueltos los restos de su querida compañera Evita.
- ¡PERÓN O MUERTE!
- ¡VIVA LA PATRIA!
- M O N T O N E R O S
― On this day, Sunday, 31 May 1970, the leadership of our organization, constituted as a Revolutionary Tribunal, after thoroughly interrogating Pedro Eugenio Aramburu, resolves:
- 1. To condemn Pedro Eugenio Aramburu to be executed by firing squad at a place and date to be determined.
- 2. To make public in due course the documentation that supports the decision of this Court.
- 3. To grant Christian burial to the remains of the accused, which will only be returned to his family when the remains of their beloved comrade Evita are returned to the Argentine people.
- PERÓN OR DEATH!
- LONG LIVE THE FATHERLAND!
- MONTONEROS

— EducAr, Secretary of Education Archives

Among supporters of Aramburu and the military, as well as within circles of journalism and writers, condemnation was nearly unanimous as they considered that regardless of any crime that Aramburu may have committed "his death only adds another name to the list of murders. It does not solve, nullifies, nor compensate for anything. It is another crime."

Susana Valle, daughter of General Valle, was arrested by the military on the night of 30 May; she was briefly held in custody and released the following day. On 9 June 1970, the military and other forces carried out raids across the country in an attempt to capture militants involved with the Montoneros or the kidnapping itself. As a result of the raids, dozens of civilians and military personnel were killed or summarily executed.

Montoneros and affiliated guerrillas viewed Aramburu's killing as a way to make the existence of their organisation known to Argentine society. Firmenich said that it marked the beginning of guerrilla activity against the military. After Aramburu's death, attacks by Montoneros and other far-left groups considerably increased. When Isabel Martínez de Perón took office in 1974, the government began to pursue justice against Aramburu's killers and others in the militias. The persecution of these guerrillas worsened after the 1976 coup d'état and the subsequent years of the National Reorganization Process and the Dirty War.

== Aftermath ==
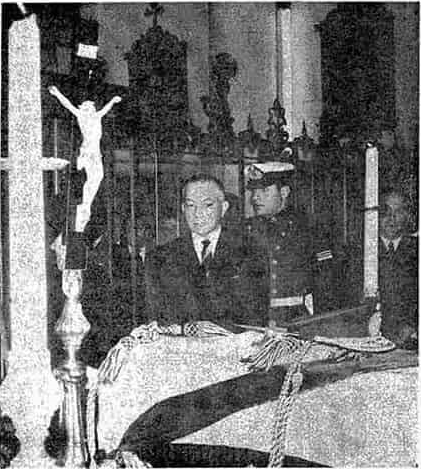
President Roberto Marcelo Levingston attending Aramburu's funeral

Aramburu received a state funeral with military honors. Among high-profile attendants were two future de facto presidents: Onganía's immediate successor Roberto Marcelo Levingston and Alejandro Lanusse, another de facto president. Aramburu's widow Sara Lucía Herrera and one of his sons were also photographed during the funeral.

According to Firmenich's statements in later interviews, the main motive behind the kidnapping and killing of Aramburu was not revenge for the wave of executions in 1956. Firmenich pointed instead to the concerns within the Montoneros about the potential negotiations between Aramburu and Perón to reach a consensus and have Aramburu become part of the moderate wing of Peronism. According to Firmenich, the group saw that move as an attempt by dominant classes to neutralise Peronism, prompting the need to highlight the dichotomy between pro- and anti-Peronists.

In 1974, Montoneros militants again targeted Aramburu by snatching his body from La Recoleta Cemetery to press President Martínez de Perón to bring back the remains of Eva Perón, who was interred in a private plot of land that Martínez de Perón owned in Spain. The desecration of Aramburu's tomb and the snatching of his body shocked Argentine society. Aramburu's remains were later returned and reinterred inside a vault designed by artist Alejandro Bustillo.

== Alternative theories about Aramburu's death ==
Versions that arose in later years by different Argentine investigative journalists suggested that Aramburu may have been the target of an operation by the government of Onganía, who strongly suspected that Aramburu was behind an imminent coup plot against him. Carlos Alconada, who served as a cabinet minister for Onganía, blamed Onganía's interior minister Francisco Imaz for the planning and execution of Aramburu's killing. Aramburu's son Eugenio said that he had no doubt that elements from the Onganía government had collaborated in the kidnapping and killing of his father.

Other theories say that the military intelligence service did not intend to kill Aramburu, but wanted to scare him. However, the operation apparently led to Aramburu's decompensation during an interrogation and he died after being taken to the Military Hospital.

== Memorials and controversies ==
In Oberá, Misiones Province, and in Copetones, Tres Arroyos Partido, Buenos Aires Province, some streets or avenues are named in honor of Aramburu. Project bills have been put forward by different NGOs to remove his name from memorials in San Juan, San Isidro, and from a school in Vera, Santa Fe. A similar action took place in the city of Goya, in Corrientes Province, where a street named after Aramburu was renamed in honour of President Néstor Kirchner.

In the 1960s, the Argentine Army named an Infantry School "Lieutenant General Pedro Eugenio Aramburu" and an Artillery School "Lieutenant General Eduardo A. Lonardi." In 2007, the army renamed them as "Lieutenant General Juan José Valle" (who was executed by firing squad along with other military personnel and civilians by Aramburu and Isaac Rojas).
