= Capital punishment in Argentina =

Disused form of punishment for a crime in Argentina

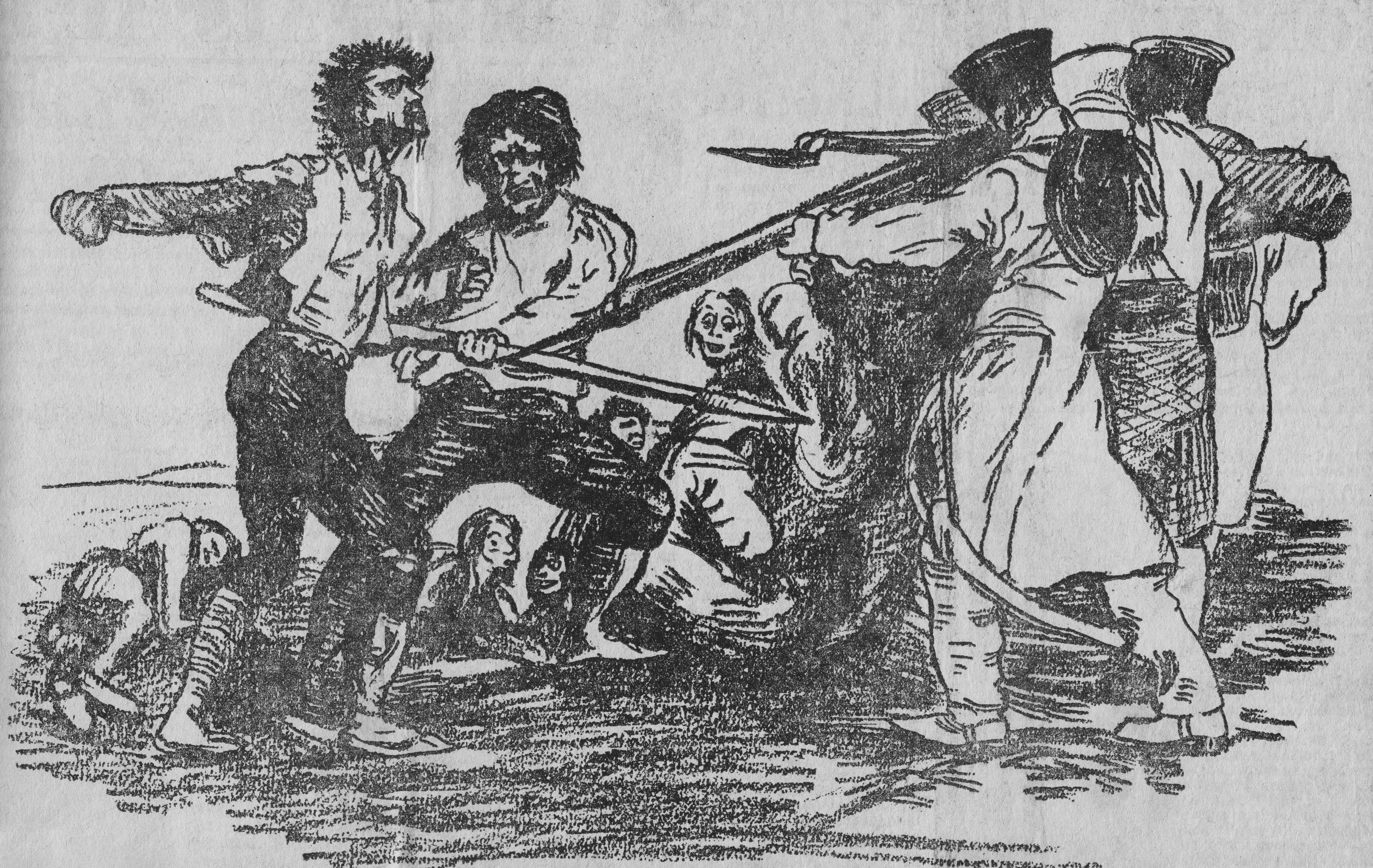
Allegory of the shootings that took place during the Revolución Libertadora.

Capital punishment was abolished and reinstituted in Argentina multiple times before its final abolition in 2008. The last execution sanctioned by a court was carried out in 1916, but many extrajudicial executions were carried out during the Dirty War.

== History ==
The first Penal Code of Argentina was passed in 1886, and was based on the code of Carlos Tejedor. In 1916, the last judicially sanctioned execution was carried out in Argentina. In 1921, capital punishment for ordinary crimes was abolished, but was expanded to political crimes in 1950, 1951, 1970, and 1971. On 2 April 1970, President Juan Carlos Onganía made a decree for the use of capital punishment on kidnappings and armed attacks on ships, plans, military units, or police. The restoration of the use of capital punishment by Onganía followed the kidnapping and execution of former de facto president Pedro Eugenio Aramburu.

President Alejandro Agustín Lanusse abolished capital punishment except for the military in 1972, but it was restored by the military dictatorship in 1976. No court sanctioned executions occurred from 1976 to 1983, but a large amount of extrajudicial executions occurred during the Dirty War.

The death penalty was abolished for ordinary crimes in 1984, and for all crimes in 2008. On 5 September 2008, Argentina ratified the Second Optional Protocol to the International Covenant on Civil and Political Rights. Argentina voted in favour of United Nations resolutions opposing capital punishment in 2007, 2008, 2010, 2012, 2014, and 2016. Argentina does not extradite prisoners unless assured that capital punishment will not be used.

In 2015, the Supreme Court rejected a request from serial killer Robledo Puch who asked to be freed or executed via lethal injection. The court upheld a lower court ruling stating that the death penalty is unconstitutional and Puch's demand is invalid.

Polling by International Research Associates in 1958, showed that 68% of people in Buenos Aires opposed capital punishment while 28% supported it. Susana Giménez called for capital punishment to be reinstated in 2009, after the murder of her hairdresser. Cacho Castaña and Michel Sardou also called for it to be reinstated. Regina Maria Cordeiro Dunlop, Brazil's ambassador to the United Nations, condemned capital punishment on behalf of Argentina, Brazil, Paraguay, and Uruguay at a session of the United Nations Human Rights Council in 2015.

== Works cited ==
=== Books ===
- Salvatore, Ricardo; Aguirre, Carlos; Joseph, Gilbert, eds. (2001). Crime and Punishment in Latin America: Law and Society Since Late Colonial Times. Duke University Press. ISBN 9780822380788.

=== Journals ===
- Elnecavé, Nissim (1971). "Argentina". American Jewish Year Book. 72. American Jewish Committee: 288–303. doi:10.2307/23605318. JSTOR 23605318.
- Erskine, Hazel (1970). "The Polls: Capital Punishment". Public Opinion Quarterly. 34 (2). Oxford University Press: 290–307. doi:10.2307/2747431. JSTOR 2747431.

=== News ===
- Mitchell, Kirk (26 April 2016). "Argentine court OKs extradition of man facing Denver murder charge". The Denver Post. Archived from the original on 17 June 2025.
- Raux, Antoine (13 March 2009). "Following the stars in a call for the death penalty". France 24. Archived from the original on 17 June 2025.

=== Web ===
- "Abolitionist and retentionist countries (as of July 2018)". Amnesty International. 23 October 2018. Archived from the original on 17 June 2025.
- "Argentina abolishes the death penalty". Amnesty International. 12 September 2008. Archived from the original on 17 June 2025.
- "How States Abolish The Death Penalty" (PDF). International Commission Against the Death Penalty. 2018. Archived (PDF) from the original on 16 April 2025.
- "Political statement by Argentina, Brazil, Paraguay and Uruguay to the UN Human Rights Council on the incompatibility between the death penalty and human rights – Geneva, June 22, 2015". Brazil. 22 June 2015. Archived from the original on 17 June 2025.
