= Montoneros =

Argentine leftist guerrilla organization (1970–1983)

- Movimiento Peronista Montonero
- Official seal of Montoneros
- Other name: MPM
- Leader: Mario Firmenich
- Dates active: 1970–1983
- Active regions: Argentina
- Ideology: Peronist Revolutionary Tendency; Falangism; Camilism; Catholic nationalism Liberation theology Catholic socialism
- Political position: Far-left
- Status: Decree 261 by Isabel Perón considered Montoneros a subversive group and ordered its destruction. The group was harassed by the Argentine Anticommunist Alliance until 1975 and completely defeated by the military dictatorship by 1981.
- Size: c. 10,000 (1975, active militants) c. 120,000 (1975, activists)
- Flag

Montoneros (Spanish: Movimiento Peronista Montonero, MPM) was a far-left, revolutionary guerrilla organization in Argentina, which emerged in the 1970s during the "Argentine Revolution" dictatorship. The Montoneros advocated an ideology combining revolutionary Peronism, Falangism, and Camilism; they were officially Roman Catholic. The organization's name referred to the 19th-century cavalry militias called Montoneras, which fought for the Federalist Party in the Argentine civil wars. The Montoneros were radicalized by the political repression of anti-Peronist regimes, the influence of the Cuban Revolution, and liberation theology worker-priests; they grew from the 1960s Catholic revolutionary guerrilla Comando Camilo Torres as a "national liberation movement", and they synthesized revolutionary Peronism, Guevarism, and the revolutionary Catholicism of Juan García Elorrio shaped by Camilism. The Montoneros fought for the return of Juan Perón to Argentina and the establishment of "Christian national socialism", based on "indigenous" Argentine and Catholic socialism; this was seen as the ultimate conclusion of Peronist doctrine.

The Montoneros' first public action occurred on 29 May 1970, with the kidnapping, revolutionary trial, and assassination of the anti-Peronist ex-dictator Pedro Eugenio Aramburu. He was one of the leaders of the 1955 coup that had overthrown the constitutional government led by President Juan Domingo Perón. Montoneros kidnapped the ex-dictator to put him on "revolutionary trial" for being a traitor to the homeland—for having shot 27 people to suppress the 1956 Valle uprising—and to recover the body of Eva Perón, whom Aramburu had kidnapped and made disappear. Montoneros was the armed nucleus of a set of nonmilitary social organizations ("mass fronts") known as the Tendencia Revolucionaria del Peronismo (or simply La Tendencia); these included the Juventud Peronista Regionales (JP), the Juventud Universitaria Peronista (JUP), the Juventud Trabajadora Peronista (JTP), the Unión de Estudiantes Secundarios (UES), the Agrupación Evita, and the Movimiento Villero Peronista.

In 1972 Montoneros merged with Descamisados, and in 1973 it merged with the Revolutionary Armed Forces (FAR), with which it had been collaborating. Its actions contributed to the military dictatorship calling for free elections in 1973, in which the multiparty electoral front (Frejuli)—of which it was a member—won. This victory included the presidential candidacy of Peronist Héctor José Cámpora—a man close to Montoneros—as well as several governors, parliamentarians, ministers, and high-ranking government officials. Cámpora's government and its relationship with the Montoneros came under heavy pressure from the beginning, from right-wing sectors, the Italian anti-communist Masonic lodge Propaganda Due, and the CIA. Only 49 days later, Cámpora was forced to resign after the Ezeiza massacre.

After Cámpora's resignation as president on 12 July 1973, the Montoneros began to lose power and became progressively isolated. This situation worsened after the assassination of trade union leader José Ignacio Rucci on 25 September 1973—attributed to Montoneros—and above all after Perón's death, on 1 July 1974. At that time, a policy of state terrorism was unleashed by the right-wing parapolice organization known as the Triple A, which was led by José López Rega—who became the right-hand man of President Isabel Perón. Two months later, Montoneros went underground again and restarted their armed struggle. On 8 September 1975, Isabel Perón issued Decree 2452/75 banning the organization's activity and classifying it as a "subversive group".

On 24 March 1976, Argentina's constitutional government was overthrown; an anti-Peronist civilian-military dictatorship was established, which imposed a totalitarian regime focused on eliminating its opponents. Montoneros relocated its leadership to Mexico, and they fought the Argentine dictatorship, inflicting serious casualties on the civil-military government while suffering heavy losses, including a large number of militants and fighters who disappeared. In 1979 and 1980, Montoneros attempted two counter-offensives that failed militarily and politically. When democracy was restored in December 1983, the Montoneros organization no longer existed as a political-military structure, and it sought to insert itself into democratic political life. During the following years, several Montoneros adherents occupied important political posts in democratic governments.

== Ideology ==
The main political currents that shaped the Montoneros were the following:

- the far-left liberation theology of Camilo Torres Restrepo
- the "Christian national socialism" of Juan Perón
- the Marxist-Leninist Guevarism of revolutionary Che Guevara
- the option for the poor and anti-imperialism promoted by Catholic priest Juan García Elorrio in his journal Cristianismo y Revolución
- the Peronist left-wing nationalism promoted by John William Cooke

In addition, the initial mentor of the group was Carlos Mugica, who saw Peronism as an Argentinian version of Catholic socialism; however, he rejected armed struggle and revolution, stating: "I am prepared to be killed but I am not prepared to kill". This stance led radicalized youth who would then form the Montoneros to embrace the more radical beliefs of Camilo Torres and García Elorrio instead; Torres argued that "The duty of every Catholic is to be a revolutionary" and that "The Catholic who is not a revolutionary is living in mortal sin". The movement also glorified Eva Perón, naming her as one of the inspirations behind the Montoneros, as well as using the slogan "Si Evita viviera, sería Montonera" ("If Evita were alive she would be a Montonero"), which became one of the group's best-known slogans. In January 1975, the official organ of the Montoneros even took the name Evita Montonera. Montoneros are considered the ideological staple of revolutionary Peronism, which combined "radical Catholic principles of justice, Peronist populism, and leftist nationalism." Montoneros remained committed to liberation theology throughout their entire existence, and the notion of Catholic martyrdom was a strong element in the Montonero worldview and political practice. They were described as "a combination of socialist ideas and violent catholic struggle in the fashion of Camillo Torres".

Other figures who influenced the Montoneros included the Juan José Hernández Arregui, who considered Peronism "the vehicle of the nation doing battle with imperialism"; historian José María Rosa, who defined Peronism as revolutionary anti-imperialism; dissident communist Rodolfo Puiggrós, who promoted 'Peronist Marxism'; and Arturo Jauretche, who founded the left-wing nationalist Fuerza de Orientación Radical de la Joven Argentina (FORJA) in 1935 and became a Peronist in the 1940s. In the late 1960s, Jauretche and Arregui held regular discussions with the Montonero leadership, refining their ideology and rhetoric. Montoneros were also influenced by the polemic between their political mentors and inspirations: in 1969 Perón expressed his interest in Elorrio's Cristianismo y Revolución and wrote a letter to Elorrio that was later published in the journal. This letter stated:

The revolution that is beginning will call into question not only capitalist society but also industrial society. The consumer society must die a violent death. The alienated society [sic] must disappear from history. We are trying a new and original world. The imagination has taken power.

Among the list of the political mentors of the Montoneros, Richard Gillespie names Camilo Torres as the most important inspiration. This is evidenced by the name of the Camilo Torres Commando, which was created in 1967; it was a precursor of the Montoneros, defining its ideology as "Peronism, socialism, Catholic liberationism, and armed struggle" and having "Latin American and Third World liberation" for its goal.

=== Liberation theology ===
Despite its far-left ideology, Montoneros originated in middle-class and upper-middle-class Catholic and nationalist backgrounds. The core of Montonero ideology was Argentinian nationalism and political Catholicism, which were later extended into Peronism and socialism. This connection was enabled by the influence of Catholicism after the Second Vatican Council, as third-worldist and liberation theology Argentinian priests—also known as the worker-priests—radicalized Catholic students into embracing these political currents. Priest Carlos Mugica, known for his work in shantytowns at the time, became a spiritual advisor of the Catholic students' organization at the National University of Central Buenos Aires; he came in contact with students who later became leading members of the Montoneros. Mugica promoted Peronism, arguing that he was "absolutely convinced that the liberation of my people will be through the Peronist movement. I know from the Gospel, from Christ's attitude, that I must see human history through the poor. And in Argentina the majority of the poor are Peronists." Catholicism was so central to Montoneros that the group began corresponding with Pope John Paul II and also had its own chaplain—Catholic priest Jorge Adur—who became the Montoneros' emissary to the Vatican.

Around 1964, Mugica contacted former members of a 1950s Peronist resistance organization known as the Tacuaristas, and he introduced them to his pupils. Mugica praised Peronism as an effective realization of Catholicism, arguing that Peronism and Catholicism were united in their goals of "love for the poor, for those persecuted for defending justice and for fighting against injustice".

=== Camilism ===
Further radicalization came from the death of Camilo Torres, a revolutionary Catholic priest who joined the Marxist-Leninist National Liberation Army and was killed during one of the organization's operations. Six months after his death, the first issue of the Catholic socialist journal Cristianismo y Revolución was published, under the direction of García Elorrio. The journal promoted reforms after the Second Vatican Council as a turn toward Marxism; encouraged armed struggle as a truly Catholic way of seizing power; idealized Camilo Torres and Che Guevara as examples of anti-imperialist martyrs; and vindicated Peronism as the "revolutionary key of national construction of socialism". Most influential concerning Montoneros was Elorrio's article from March 1967, which connected Camilo Torres' struggle to Peronism:

We are all in the same war; the question is on which side? There are no third ways—clerical meditations or company truces. And there should not be. This is the challenge which reaction has thrown at us. From national frustration we must now move rapidly to confrontation. The government has already announced that the escalation phase has begun. This statement hides the only reality: official violence against the rebellion of the people. We are in the thick of violence and cannot be on the sidelines...

As martyr and symbol of the demand 'liberation or death', Camilo Torres died as a guerrilla a year ago. Camilo faithfully realized his personal road to revolution. Priest and sociologist, political fighter and agitator, student and mass leader, he satisfied his thirst for justice by joining the armed struggle when he understood that the oligarchy shuts all roads and confronts the people with its ultimate weapon—violence ...

Camilo represents contradiction, scandal, probing, unity, sacrifice, action, violence, and commitment. We accept him and uphold him in his totality. We do not parcel him out or divide him according to where our fear takes us. We want to be with him in our Argentine reality, fighting with the Peronist movement for the victory of the working class, for the realization of socialism in our national experience.

Under the banner of Camilo, we hereby declare total war on exploitation, on imperialism, on under-development, and on all people who betray our country from within or without. We also hereby affirm our declaration of revolutionary faith, revolutionary necessity, and revolutionary existence. We affirm a faith full of hope in the triumph of the people, a definite and permanent necessity, and an existence dictated by our Christianity.

With Camilo, we believe that revolution is the only efficient and meaningful way to achieve love for all.

Richard Gillespie identifies Cristianismo y Revolución as the decisive factor behind the radicalization of Catholic students and the creation of Montoneros, along with the Movement of Priests for the Third World. The journal made emotional appeals for sympathy for the oppressed, and it made radical Catholics identify themselves with the 'national liberation' struggles of the Third World—with Perón and Guevara named as primary examples. The journal also glorified militants, paid homage to them, and portrayed their deaths as an ultimate sacrifice in the name of love for the downtrodden. Cristianismo y Revolución also defused dislike of Peronism among Catholic and mainstream socialist circles: Elorrio regarded Catholic and socialist opposition to Peronism as a mistake, which resonated with the hitherto anti-Peronist middle class, who were now disillusioned with the authoritarianism and corruption of post-Perón Argentinian governments. Because of this disillusionment, former anti-Peronists "now embraced Peronism with the zeal of reformed sinners". Elorrio also pushed his readers toward action and revolution, writing:

I had to fight with the slaves, the people, as they fought, not as an elitist teacher who tells them what is good and what is evil and then goes back to his study to read Saint Augustine, but as a genuine participant, with them not for them, in their misery, their failings, their violence ... Either I fought or I was a phony.

Catholic influence remained strong during the entirety of Montoneros' existence. Martha Crenshaw remarked that its members "were regular church attenders right up to the moment of going underground", and the organization established its own Catholic "chaplaincy" after resuming clandestine resistance in September 1974. Montoneros' liberation theology also included a Cuban-inspired cult of martyrdom for its fallen members—guerrillero heroico.

Juan Carlos Onganía's assumption of power in Argentina, through a coup d'etat in 1966, resulted in Montoneros openly embracing the concept of revolutionary struggle—not only because of the new government's "neoliberal" economic policies, but also because of suppression of political and cultural participation, such as universities and political parties. Historian Michael Goebel argues that the government's actions made academics friendly to Perón, which was a side effect of the mass exodus of intellectuals caused by university purges. Academic staff was replaced by professors and priests from Catholic universities, who were now friendly toward Perón. In 1967, Camilo Torres Commando was formed, which became the armed precursor of the Montoneros. Philosopher Donald C. Hodges notes that the ideology of Camilo Torres Commando was identical to that of Montoneros, representing "a fusion of Camilist, Guevarist, and Cookist themes combined with the cult of Evita Perón". In 1970, the Commando officially became the Montoneros, named after Montoneras, irregular popular troops who followed the federal caudillos (personalist leaders wielding political power) in the Argentine interior during the 19th century. The Montoneros' ideology of armed struggle was influenced by the Foquismo doctrine of Che Guevara, together with the theory of urban guerrilla warfare written by the Peronist Abraham Guillén and the Marxist-Leninist group Tupamaros.

=== Revolutionary Peronism ===
Alongside radicalized Catholic priests, John William Cooke became the second major influence on the Montoneros. Named as "personal delegate" by Perón during his exile, Cooke was tasked with leading the Peronist resistance in Argentina. He spent several years in Cuba afterwards, adopting Castro's anti-imperialism and becoming the main thinker for revolutionary Peronism, describing Peronism as a leftist movement that would lead an anti-imperialist revolution of "national liberation" in Argentina. Heavily inspired by the Cuban Revolution, Cooke defined Peronism as "antibureaucratic, socialist, profoundly national, and sister to all the world's exploited". Perón embraced Cooke's ideas, praising the Cuban Revolution and comparing himself with Castro. Although Guevara came from an Argentine anti-Peronist family, he visited Perón in Madrid and was deeply impressed by his political thought, praising Peronism as "indigenous Latin American socialism with which the Cuban Revolution could side". Perón confirmed this political alliance, galvanizing left-wing Peronists; upon Guevara's death in 1967, Perón praised him as "one of ours, perhaps the best".

Cooke and Perón formulated the idea of "national socialism", which would become the defining ideology of both the Montoneros and the broader Peronist movement. This idea was based on combining social revolution with national liberation. As Cooke wrote:

The struggle for liberation starts from the definition of the real enemy, imperialism that acts through the native oligarchy and the political, economic, and cultural mechanisms at its service ... the national question and the social question are indissolubly joined.

Cooke also referred to the Peronist concept of justicialism, arguing that its essence was anti-imperialism and social revolution. This argument was complemented by Perón in redefining his "Third Position" in 1972. He clarified that it was not a centrist position nor a third way between capitalism and communism, but rather a Peronist embrace of the Third World; he argued that Peronists must align themselves "with movements of national and social liberation", which Perón listed as Castroist Cuba and Allende's Chile (among others). That same year, the Peronist October Front described Peronism as "the national expression of the socialism, to the extent that it represents, expresses and develops in action the aspirations of the popular masses and the Argentine working class" and popularized the term "indigenous socialism" that justicalismo was to represent.

Hodges remarked that "the program of national liberation defended by the Montoneros was an evidently populist one, predicated on the establishment of a popular state which would control and plan the economy as a necessary condition of political and economic independence." In their program published in Cristianismo y Revolución on behalf of Elorrio, Montoneros stayed loyal to Perón's vision of "Christian national socialism"—introducing themselves as the "armed wing of Peronism" and stating:

we set ourselves the objective of constituting with other organizations the Peronist armed movement, which together with other armed groups will develop the people's war for the seizure of power and the implementation of national socialism in which they become a reality our three flags: economic independence, social justice and political sovereignty.

In the Cuban newspaper Granma, Montoneros further elaborated:

We are Peronists even though we come from different origins and trainings. Peronism has a doctrine created in 1945 that was reworked and updated during the subsequent 25 years. This doctrine is synthesized in the three flags of the movement: Economic Independence, Social Justice and Political Sovereignty. These three flags in 1970 are expressed through the need to achieve independent economic development and a fair distribution of wealth, within the framework of a socialist system that respects our history and our national culture. On the other hand, the doctrine was defined by its creator, General Perón, as deeply national, humanist and Christian, respectful of the human person above all things.

=== Social conservatism ===
While revolutionary and far-left in character, the Montoneros were conservative in their social and cultural outlook. In 1972, the English-language newspaper Buenos Aires Herald published an article by journalists Robert Cox and Andrew Graham-Yooll, which presented a sexualised image of Eva Perón. The Argentine opinion was said to express "enormous revulsion" at the article, and "the most extreme form of literary criticism came from the heads of the Montonera guerrillas." Montoneros accused the newspaper not only of tarnishing the image of Eva Perón, but also breaching the Catholic norms of Argentine society. In May 1972, the Montoneros decided to assassinate Graham-Yooll, but this order was later cancelled by the intervention of Peronist politician Diego Muñiz Barreto, who vouched for Graham-Yooll.

Argentine journalist Miriam Lewin noted that the Montoneros were "socially conservative and founded upon deep patriarchal structures". Male homosexuality and feminism were opposed, and gender roles were enforced; feminine men were rejected, and women were considered to be caretakers, unsuitable for revolutionary acts. Montoneros denounced the concept of "free love" and instead embraced a heterosexual, monogamous model. Infidelity was a forbidden act according to their code of conduct—the Código de Justicia Penal Revolucionario (Revolutionary Penal Code)—along with casual sex and abortion, which were seen as "petty bourgeois" acts. Couples within the Montoneros were required to have been partnered for more than six months before being allowed to cohabit. Montoneros protested the infiltration of left-wing and Peronist causes by homosexual activists; during their marches and protests, they chanted slogans such as "We are not faggots, we are not drug addicts, we are the soldiers of Perón and Montoneros!" (Spanish: No somos putos, no somos faloperos, somos soldados de Perón y montoneros) or "We're not faggots, we're not junkies, we're soldiers from FAR and Montoneros!" (Spanish: No somos putos, no somos faloperos, somos soldados de FAR y Montoneros).

The moral code of the Montoneros was explicitly based on Catholic social teaching. Christian asceticism marked the organization's everyday life, and members were to eat frugally and embrace Christian humility. Infidelity, defined as having sexual relations with someone other than one's partner, was equated with the crime of "disloyalty"; the Montoneros' code decreed that both parties involved in such an affair were considered guilty, even if only one of them had a steady partner. Commenting on the rule, the guerrilla leader Mario Firmenich stated:

The New Man cannot be irresponsible in his relationship with his partner. Among us, nobody marries and separates on a whim, just because they feel the urge. And we don't tolerate treachery [agachadas], we're very clear on that. We deal with traitors by executing them.

Scholar Susanne Meachem wrote that the attitude of Montoneros was influenced by machismo, and actions such as infidelity, homosexuality, and taking drugs were seen as incompatible with being a "soldier of Perón". Montoneros described homosexuality as "sexual debauchery", "a threat to internal security", and a sign of "individualistic and liberal" tendencies.

To reflect the structure of the Justicialist Party, which contained a separate Female Peronist Party, the Montoneros had their own female branch—Agrupación Evita, in order "to reach women in the factories, slums, and poor neighborhoods of Argentina". However, Agrupación Evita was not a reflection of gender by Montoneros or an encouragement of feminism. Instead, Montoneros "insisted on heterosexuality and motherhood even in situations with the looming threat of imprisonment and an overall air of an uncertain future". The organization proposed a romanticized concept of "a new woman" who would have "children for a new beginning", and it expected women to fulfill their revolutionary role through motherhood. Meachem argues that the Montoneros' views on women "were as reactionary as those of the ultra-right—a discourse of monogamy, orthodox politics and customs". This was part of the Montoneros' vision of "compulsory heterosexuality, which was in promotion of an ideal revolutionary couple who was both monogamous and heterosexual". In keeping with Peronist and Catholic ideals, the Montoneros also denounced abortion. In the organization, "it was generally understood that if a woman became pregnant, she had the child". In addition, Firmenich declared the group's opposition to birth control programs.

The organization's adherence to Catholic moralism went beyond forbidding adultery: Montoneros practiced sexual self-restraint, and their personal lives were regulated by rigid rules. A former Montonero, Graciela Daleo, wrote that the Montoneros "observed very strict moral norms". She recalled that relationships within the organization were chaste; displays of affection were limited to cheek kissing, and a Montonero was expected to obtain his parents' approval before entering a relationship. Additionally, in keeping with its Catholic morality, Montoneros also enforced the tradition of marrying in religious ceremonies. In addition, Firmenich firmly enforced family-centered morality in the organization, combining both Peronist and Catholic traditions; he believed that the Montoneros should have five children (twice the average birthrate at the time) and pointed to his own family life as an example. Because the movement believed in conservative family values, Montoneros also had Domingo Montonero (transl. Montonero Sunday), days set aside for revolutionaries to spend with their families.

Hodges notes that Montoneros had begun as Catholic nationalists and remained committed to it throughout their activities, transforming Catholic nationalism into a far-left ideology. The Montoneros prided themselves on patriotism and following "indigenous", Argentine forms of socialism and revolution, while rejecting "imported" or "exotic" models. While considered a Marxist organization, the Montoneros based their revolutionary beliefs on writings of Cooke and Perón, rather than on Marx. Likewise, Montoneros' embrace of revolutionary violence did not come from Marxism, but from Camilo Torres Restrepo and Juan García Elorrio, who reconciled Catholic moralism with violent revolution. Montonero idealism was based on romantic notions of a "new man" and establishing God's kingdom on Earth, in combination with a cult of self-sacrifice and moral heroism.

In its statements, Montoneros combined their calls for a patria socialista (transl. socialist fatherland) with Catholic moralism and pledges of loyalty to Perón. Richard Gillespie points to the conservative origins of the group, noting that the Montoneros "gained their political baptism in branches of the traditionally conservative Catholic Action" and "the Falange-inspired Tacuara". Historian David Rock argued that despite stating their commitment to socialism, Montoneros declared their opposition to "godless" and "antinational" forms of communism, and they considered themselves "Catholic militants" and "Catholic nationalists". Rock adds that "the old Catholic nationalism, particularly in the assumption of right-wing nationalist tropes and metaphors such as the notion of the national being (ser nacional)", was still present in the Montoneros' ideology.

=== Right-wing influences ===
Montoneros described themselves as "Peronist, ultra-Catholic nationalists". The Cambridge History of Latin America noted that Montoneros drew on "Third World nationalism, liberation theology, and right-wing nationalist ideas that had inspired the neofascist movements of previous decades". It highlighted the political past of Montoneros' leaders and key activists: two of Montoneros' founders, Fernando Abal Medina and Gustavo Ramus, were former members of the Tacuara movement; Rodolfo Walsh, a prominent Montonero journalist, was a member of the Nationalist Liberation Alliance in the past. Historians Sandra McGee Deutsch and Ronald H. Dotkart wrote that there were notable "rightist influences on the Montoneros", arguing that the "right's nationalism, historical revisionism, and other features have had a powerful influence" on the organization.

Montoneros were described as being from a "violent nationalistic tradition", and they combined both right-wing and left-wing nationalism; their ideology was defined by Marxism, Peronism, liberation theology, and dependency theory. According to David Rock, beyond their self-identification as Catholic nationalists and Catholic integralists, the Montoneros also retained ideological elements that seemingly collided with their far-left orientation, such as anti-atheism and opposition to "godless, antinational and foreign communism(s)". Carlos Mugica, who shaped the political thought of future Montoneros, wrote: "Jesus was the most ambitious revolutionary throughout history, who wanted not only new structures ... but a new form of living unthinkable to mankind." Nevertheless, Mugica's rhetoric retained traces of anticommunism and clericalism, as he wrote: "Complete equality will only be achieved on the coming of the Lord. Marxism overemphasizes material man."

Rock argues that while the Montoneros represented the "New Left", far-left liberation theology Catholicism, and anti-imperialist nationalism, they nevertheless maintained "numerous vestiges of the Nationalist movement and the clerical Right." However, he also cautions against claims of the Montoneros being inspired by fascism or being reduced to a "strange fusion or marriage between the Left and Right", arguing that the Montoneros "evoked the indigenous Nationalists more than the foreign fascists." He concludes that the organization was neo-Peronist as well as "neo-Nationalist", which meant continuing the ideological elements of historical Argentinian movements; Montoneros combined these two influences together with "renegade communism".

Luis Miguel Donatello argues that the Montoneros' worldview was Catholic integralism that had continuities with the Tacuaras as well as Falangism. In the 1960s, Catholic integralism had undergone an ideological shift, embracing concepts from liberation theology—such as structural sin—as well as endorsing Marxist-Catholic dialogue. This shift included Falangist circles who reconsidered their relationship with socialism, arguing that the anti-imperialism, anti-liberalism, and anti-capitalism of socialism already align with Falangist ideals. Similarly to Peronists, Falangists were also enthusiastic about the Cuban Revolution, with many Latin American and Spanish Falangists embracing the label of "Falangist-Castroist", as well as praising Che Guevara and Cuban leader Fidel Castro as "copies of Jesus Christ and of José Antonio Primo de Rivera and the embodiment of Hispanic values". Donatello states that Montoneros mixed "white-integralism" with "red integralism", and the organization should be placed with Falangists and other Catholic integralists in the anti-liberal "national-Catholic matrix".

Montoneros originated from and maintained the ideology of Falangism. Rock wrote that the ideological currents in Montoneros ranged "from Catholic radicals to quasi-falangist" members. According to historian Celina Albornoz, rather than abandoning its Tacuara origins, Montoneros developed and maintained ties with the Spanish far-right. Sociologist Patricia Marchak argued that not only did Montoneros have "right-wing Catholic nationalist roots", but they also maintained the "ideology of the Spanish Falange but combined with Peronism, with the objective of creating a national syndicalist state." Similarly, Hodges observed that although the ideology of Montoneros was "akin to Marxism", they "still upheld the ideology of the Spanish Falange represented by José Antonio Primo de Rivera", but they "looked to Peronism to implement the Falangist objective of a national syndicalist state." Hodges also noted that Montoneros formulated their own Christian version of [Peronist] national socialism, which was nevertheless "strongly influenced by the Spanish Falange and by the writings of José Antonio Primo de Rivera"; nevertheless, the strong influences of Che Guevara and Frantz Fanon on the Montoneros gave the organization a revolutionary character.

Historians Carlos Altamirano and Beatriz Sarlo classified Montoneros as Catholic nationalists, arguing that there were notable continuities between Catholic integralism and the Montoneros' liberation theology. Sarlo stated that liberationist Catholics were "revolutionary integrists", and that the liberation Catholicism of the Montoneros "was motivated by the goal of constructing a single kingdom of God on earth, animated by a mystification of poverty and a collapse of all public-private divides." Sarlo characterized Montoneros as "reactionary components of the revolutionary forces", describing them as radicalized Catholics who became "revolutionary Catholic integralists" and saw liberation theology and socialism as ways of constructing a "kingdom of God on earth", promoted through the mystification of poverty and the abolition of private property. Montoneros spoke of political issues in religious terms and affirmed "the integrity of the Christian doctrine in all spheres of life" while opposing the secularization of modern society. As such, the Montoneros were considered to represent a far-left form of National Catholicism and Catholic integralism. Likewise, Atlamirano noted that an "integrist" attitude resonated in the ideology of the Montoneros, namely "the affirmation of the integrity of the Christian doctrine in all spheres of life, in opposition to that which accompanies the secularization of modern society".

In addition, Montoneros faced accusations of fascist or right-wing ideological elements. Jacobo Timerman alleged that the Montoneros combined Marxism and nationalism, which he described as "fascism of the left". A similar accusation was made by philosopher Pablo Giussani, who compared the Montoneros to the Italian political party Fasci Italiani di Combattimento. Both Timerman and Giussani, however, also argued that Guevarism was a distortion of Marxism and represented a form of "red fascism". In response to these analyses, historian Donald C. Hodges wrote: "I have already argued that it is a mistake to classify Peronism as a fascist movement. If my analysis stands up, then it is also erroneous to classify the different versions of revolutionary Peronism as fascist-inspired." He noted that the ideology of the Montoneros included elements such as a cult of death and violence, but it did not stem from fascist idealization of war and militarism, but rather from Che Guevara's cult of heroism and Eva Perón's praise of revolutionary violence. When Juan Perón was imprisoned in 1945, he was released after a general strike declared by the General Confederation of Labour (CGT); Eva, however, wanted to force the release of Juan via workers' militias, which she began organizing and arming. Eva argued that violence is a legitimate vehicle for change, writing: "With or without bloodshed, the race of oligarchs, exploiters of mankind, will inevitably perish in this century!" Her slogan "Peronism will be revolutionary, or it will be nothing!" also made her an important figure and inspiration for the Peronist left.

=== Women and their participation ===
Although men predominated on the military front, some testimonies state: "Female participation was significant and, in general, the numbers of men and women were fairly balanced. [...] It is true that women did not rise beyond mid-level positions."

Childcare placed women at a disadvantage for advancement within the organization, because they did not have as much time available as men did. Two tendencies emerged among women: those who prioritized caring for their children and those who prioritized militancy:

Either we lost out as militants, or we lost out as mothers. [...] The fear, both mine and that of the other female militants, was what would happen to our children if we were captured—whether we would be killed or blackmailed through threats against them.

Militants were expected to entrust the care of their children only to other members of the organization. During exile in Cuba, a guardería (childcare facility) was established in the Miramar district of Havana, near the house where the Montoneros leadership operated.

The young student Ana María González, a member of Montoneros, was responsible for placing an explosive device under the bed of the leader of the Argentine Federal Police—Brigadier General Cesario Cardozo—causing his death. She herself was killed a few months later in an armed confrontation.

=== Relations with Perón ===
Montoneros had a complicated relationship with Juan Perón himself. In February 1971, Perón sent a letter to Montoneros, agreeing with their declaration that "the only possible road for the people to seize power and install national socialism is total, national, and prolonged revolutionary war", and he praised the organization for adapting Peronist doctrine to the difficult conditions created by the military dictatorship. Seen as having received Perón's endorsement, the organization was soon joined by several other Peronist organizations: shortly after Perón's response, the Descamisado Political-Military Organization under the leadership of Horacio Mendizabal and Norberto Habegger merged with Montoneros; in October 1973, Montoneros welcomed the FAR into its ranks; and in 1974, the Peronist Armed Forces also joined Montoneros. As Perón returned to Argentina in July 1973—and was welcomed by large groups and overjoyed demonstrations—Montoneros were reported to be "winning the street", with chants such as "long live the Montoneros who killed Aramburu" being popular Peronist slogans. However, Perón's return marked increasing conflict between various Peronist wings, each determined to gain the upper hand. According to Perón biographer Jill Hedges, Perón was alarmed by the fact that his return did not reduce political violence in Argentina, but rather invited further clashes between the left and right wings of his movement. Perón also believed that some guerrilla and right-wing groups did not genuinely support him, but rather planned his assassination instead.

In September 1973, Perón attempted to maintain unity in his movement, and he met with leaders of the Montoneros and FAR. However, Perón was heartbroken by the assassination of trade union leader José Ignacio Rucci, for which the Montoneros claimed responsibility. Rucci's assassination marked the first time that Perón cried in public. Perón went into a state of depression, and he declared at Rucci's death: "They killed my son. They cut off my legs." The death of Rucci turned Perón cold toward Montoneros, culminating in Perón demanding their expulsion from the justicialist movement on May Day in 1974, which insulted the Peronist left. Despite this coolness, Montoneros never abandoned Perón and glorified him after his death. His last major speech from 12 June 1974, in which Perón denounced an "imperialist plot", was interpreted by the Montoneros as proof that Perón was "to a great extent taking up the orientations and many of the criticisms which we were formulating". Sociologist Ronaldo Munck argues that Perón did not want to abandon Montoneros, and his June speech was intended to restore their trust after the May Day confrontation. Montoneros praised Perón for realizing his "May Day mistake" shortly before his death, and they continued to identify him as their mentor. However, after Perón's death, the Montoneros went underground on 6 September 1974 and organized resistance against the regime of Isabel Perón; this occurred because Isabel's government was dominated by right-wing figures, who sought to centralize their control of the movement and initiated crackdowns on other Peronist factions.

Following the death of Juan Perón, Montoneros declared war on the government of Isabel Perón, denouncing it as "neither popular nor Peronist" and comparing it to the military dictatorship that ruled Argentina before March 1973. Montoneros presented themselves as the successors of Perón's original program, considering it an essential part of their far-left outlook and arguing that its reconstruction was necessary for the national liberation of Argentina. Montoneros continued to proclaim national liberation and the construction of socialism as their main goals; these they defined as liberation from imperialist domination and suppression of private ownership of the means of production, as well as a planned economy "in accordance with the particularities of the national productive structure". Montoneros praised Peronism as "the main, richest and most generalised experience of the Argentine working class and national sectors to achieve the objective of national and social liberation", and it called its ideology "Authentic Peronism" starting in September 1974. The organization also stressed that it was not abandoning the justicialist movement, but proposed its reconstruction instead, as Montoneros found it necessary to depose "reactionary elements" that had infiltrated Peronism. The new government of Isabel Perón was decried as not only not Peronist, but also "anti-Peronist, anti-popular, repressive and pro-monopoly". Montoneros re-emphasized their glorification of Eva Perón, including the establishment of "the Peronist militias that Evita imagined, so that all the people can actively participate in all the forms of confrontation" toward its goals.

== Revolutionary Penal Justice Code ==
Montoneros had its Revolutionary Penal Justice Code approved on 4 October 1975, which applied to all members (Article 1). It was based on the "provisions" previously approved at the end of 1972—making them even stricter, particularly concerning resistance under torture.

Among the code's provisions was the death penalty for certain conduct by members (Article 21), which could only be imposed by the National Council (Article 28). On 26 August 1975, before the code came into force, member Fernando Haymal was accused of treason and informing, tried by a "revolutionary tribunal" with no legal basis, sentenced, and killed on 2 September.

== Montoneros press ==
In 1973, the organization launched the weekly magazine El Descamisado (lit. 'shirtless one'), which was highly influential at the time. Directed by Dardo Cabo, it published 47 issues and reached a circulation of 100,000 copies.

Decamisado

Montoneros used journalism as a tool for political dissemination and operational cover. The organization controlled the newspaper Noticias (20 December 1973 – 27 August 1974); its editorial staff included Rodolfo Walsh, Horacio Verbitsky, Juan Gelman, and a young Ricardo Horacio Roa (now an editor at the newspaper Clarín), until it was closed by the government of Isabel Perón. After the 1976 coup, Walsh founded the Agencia de Noticias Clandestina (ANCLA), which distributed more than 200 reports on kidnappings and killings despite military censorship, until his death in March 1977.

Roa's early militancy in the Peronist Youth and in the magazine El Descamisado directly linked him to Mario Firmenich and Montoneros structures. Nearly half a century later, his name reappeared as secretary of the Fundación Ñandú, transformed into a civil association in 2013; his name also appeared as a family partner in Ticketear S.A., the company that receives 15% of each registration fee for the Buenos Aires Marathon, a business that in 2024–2025 approached 3 billion pesos and prompted allegations of tax evasion and money laundering.

== History ==
=== From 1970 to Videla's military dictatorship ===
The Montoneros formed around 1970 out of a confluence of Roman Catholic groups, university students in social sciences, and leftist supporters of Juan Perón. "The Montoneros took their name from the pejorative term used by the 19th-century elite to discredit the mounted followers of the popular caudillos." The term Montonera referred to raiding parties composed of Native Americans in Argentina, and the spear in the Montoneros seal refers to this inspiration.

The Montoneros initiated a campaign to destabilize by force the regime supported by the US, which had trained Argentinian and other Latin American dictators via the School of the Americas (a US Department of Defense school).

Notable events involving the Montoneros between 1970 and 1973 included the following:

- 1970: As retribution for the June 1956 León Suárez massacre and general Juan José Valle's execution, the Montoneros kidnapped and executed former dictator Pedro Eugenio Aramburu (1955–1958) and other collaborators.
- 14 October 1970: Montoneros urban guerrillas operating in the Villa Urquiza suburb of Buenos Aires gunned down and killed Subcommissioner Osvaldo Sandoval, who at the time was handling the Argentine Federal Police investigation of the murder of Pedro Aramburu.
- November 1971: In solidarity with militant car workers, Montoneros took over the FIAT car manufacturing plant in the city of Caseros, sprayed 38 new cars with petrol, and set them on fire.
- 26 July 1972: The guerrillas set off explosives in the Plaza de San Isidro in Buenos Aires, which injured three policemen and killed one fireman (Carlos Adrián Ayala), who died of wounds two days later. That same day, a policeman (Agent Ramón González) was shot dead after intercepting a vehicle when the two male and two female Montoneros guerrillas inside drew their guns and opened fire on the police vehicle.
- 17 October 1972: A powerful bomb detonated inside the Buenos Aires Sheraton hotel, which had nearly 700 guests at the time, killing a Canadian woman (Lois Crozier, travel agent from West Vancouver) and gravely wounding her husband Gerry while he slept. The Montoneros and the Revolutionary Armed Forces later claimed responsibility for this attack.
- 11 March 1973: Argentina held general elections for the first time in ten years. Perón loyalist Héctor Cámpora became president, and Perón returned from Spain. In a controversial move, he released all left-wing guerrillas held in prison at the time.
- April 1973: Colonel Héctor Irabarren, head of the 3rd Army Corps' Intelligence Service, was killed when resisting a kidnap attempt by the Mariano Pojadas and Susana Lesgart platoons of the Montoneros.

Hector Cámpora’s first week as Argentina’s President was marked by bloody street battles that left four dead and dozens wounded. On 25 May 1973, some 40,000 guerrilla sympathizers among the civilian population gathered at Villa Devoto prison demanding that all captured Montoneros and ERP members held inside be set free. To avoid a bloody confrontation, some 500 guerrillas and militants were physically let out of the gates that evening.

The presidential pardon and subsequent congressional amnesty delivered a profound institutional shock to Argentina's security apparatus. Embittered by the reality that years of hard police work and supporting counterinsurgency operations on the part of the armed forces had been erased overnight, the military and police leadership forged a sinister plot to never rely on the judicial system again. This "take no prisoners" pact cemented the nature of the state violence in Argentina; when the security forces launched their new campaigns, they abandoned lawful arrests and public indictments in favour of nocturnal, deniable abductions on the part of the Argentine Anti-Communist Alliance (Alianza Anticomunista Argentina or Triple A). These state-backed death-squads soon established a vast network of secret detention centres where suspected terrorists and their supporters were tortured without legal recourse and then executed. To erase the evidence of these murders and avoid leaving physical evidence, the death-squads turned to horrific disposal methods with prisoners buried anonymously in mass graves or remote plots, registered falsely under the acronym "N.N." (No Nomen, or No Name) and committing some of the worst crimes against humanity in Latin America.

==== 1974 ====
On 21 February 1974, Montoneros hitmen armed with 9 mm submachine guns from the "Evita Montonero" Platoon killed 49-year-old Teodoro Ponce—a right-wing Peronist labor leader—outside his residence at 800 Gorriti Street in the city of Rosario. He had sought refuge in a local business after being shot in the leg, and then in the back, by guerrillas who arrived in two cars. One of the gunmen killed Ponce with a shot to the head as he lay on the floor; two other civilians were also shot in the leg during the intense gunfire.

On 1 May 1974, Perón expelled the Montoneros from the Justicialist May Day rally after Montonero-organized youth chanted slogans against Perón's wife, Isabel. Despite the May Day confrontation with Perón, when Perón threatened to resign on 12 June, Montoneros responded by calling for the defence of both Perón and his government.

Perón did not desire to abandon the Montoneros, and he sought to restore his trust during his last speech of June 1974, where he denounced "the oligarchy and the pressures exerted by imperialism upon his government"; this was seen as implying that he was being manipulated by the Peronist right. In response, Montoneros praised Perón for "realizing his May Day mistake", and they continued to identify him as their mentor. However, Perón died shortly thereafter. The Montoneros went underground on 6 September 1974 and organized resistance against the regime of Isabel Perón—her government was dominated by right-wing figures, who sought to centralize their control of the movement and initiated crackdowns on other Peronist factions.

After Juan Perón's death in July 1974 and Isabel's rise to power, Montoneros claimed to have the "social revolutionary vision of authentic Peronism", and they started guerrilla operations against the government. The more radically orthodox Peronist and right-wing factions quickly took control of the government; Isabel Perón, president since Juan Perón's death, was essentially a figurehead under the influence of politician López Rega.

On 15 July 1974, Montoneros assassinated Arturo Mor Roig, a former foreign minister. Two days later, after exchanging fire with police, they murdered David Kraiselburd—journalist and editor-in-chief of the newspaper El Día—in the Manuel B. Gonnet suburb of Buenos Aires.

In September, in order to finance their operations, Montoneros kidnapped two brothers of the family-owned corporation Bunge and Born. Approximately 20 urban guerrillas dressed as policemen shot dead a bodyguard and chauffeur, and they diverted traffic in a well-orchestrated ambush. Some 30 militants and sympathizers among the civilian population provided the guerrillas with safe houses and a means of escape. Montoneros demanded and received a ransom of US$60 million in cash, as well as $1.2 million worth of food and clothing to give to the poor.

Under López Rega's orders, the Triple A began kidnapping and killing members of Montoneros and the People's Revolutionary Army (ERP), as well as other leftist militant groups. Triple A expanded their attacks to anyone considered a leftist subversive or sympathizer, such as these groups' deputies or lawyers.

The Montoneros and the ERP in turn attacked business and political figures throughout Argentina, and they raided military bases for weapons and explosives. The Montoneros killed executives from three automobile manufacturers: General Motors, Ford, and Chrysler. Six automobile manufacturers—General Motors, Chrysler, Citröen, FIAT, Ford, and Peugeot—eventually withdrew from the Argentine market or shut down all their car manufacturing plants in the country. On 16 September 1974, about 40 Montoneros bombs exploded throughout Argentina. These bombs targeted both foreign companies and commemorative ceremonies of the Revolución Libertadora, the military revolt that had ended Juan Perón's first term as president on 16 September 1955. The targets included three Ford showrooms; Peugeot and IKA-Renault automobile showrooms; Goodyear and Firestone tire distributors; the pharmaceutical manufacturers Riker and Eli Lilly; the Union Carbide Battery Company; the Bank of Boston and Chase Manhattan Bank; the Xerox Corporation; and the soft drink companies Coca-Cola and Pepsi-Cola. In addition, on 16 September, Peronist guerrillas held up two trains at gunpoint in a Buenos Aires suburb. The Montoneros discouraged foreign investment more directly by blowing up the homes of corporate executives. For example, in 1975 the homes of five executives of Lazar Laboratories were bombed in the suburb of La Plata outside Buenos Aires. Montoneros violence was widespread.

==== 1975 ====
On 7 February, four carloads of Montoneros intercepted the car driven by Antonio Muscat, a manager of Bunge y Born, and they shot him dead in the presence of his daughter. On 14 February 1975, Montoneros killed Hipólito Acuña, a politician, as he parked his car outside his home in the city of Santa Fe. On 18 February, Montoneros gunmen killed Félix Villafañe of the FITAM S.A. workers union, in the presence of his wife, in the suburb of San Isidro outside Buenos Aires. On 22 February 1975, in an ambush in the Lomas de Zamora suburb of Buenos Aires, three policemen—First Sergeant Nicolás Cardozo, Corporal Roberto Roque Fredes and Constables Eugenio Rodríguez and Abel Pascuzzi—were killed after their patrol car came under fire from Montoneros guerrillas. On 26 February 1975, the Montoneros kidnapped 62-year-old John Patrick Egan, a US consular agent in the city of Córdoba, executing him two days later. That same day, they killed three policemen in another ambush by urban guerrillas in Buenos Aires, and an army conscript in Tucumán province was reported to have been killed in action.

On 5 March 1975, a Montoneros bomb detonated in the underground parking at Plaza Colón of the Argentine Army High Command; a garbage truck driver (Alberto Blas García) was killed, and 28 others were wounded, including four colonels and army members of 18 other ranks. In early June 1975, Montoneros guerrillas murdered executives David Bargut and Raúl Amelong of the Acindar steel firm in Rosario, in reprisal for alleged repression against striking employees. On 10 June 1975, guerrillas in Santa Fe shot and killed Juan Enrique Pelayes, a trade union leader. On 12 June 1975, in an ambush in the capital of the Córdoba province, three policemen—Pedro Ramón Enrico, Carlos Alberto Galíndez and corporal Luis Francisco Rodríguez—were killed by guerrillas. On 25 July 1975, four policemen were wounded in guerrilla attacks using bazookas and firebombs. On 26 August 1975, 26-year-old Fernando Haymal was killed by fellow Montoneros for allegedly cooperating with government forces.

The Montoneros' leadership was eager to learn from the ERP's military unit Compañía de Monte Ramón Rosa Jiménez, which was operating in the province of Tucumán. In 1975, Montoneros sent "observers" to spend a few months with the ERP platoons operating against the Argentine army's 5th Infantry Brigade, then consisting of the 19th, 20th, and 29th Mountain Infantry Regiments. On 28 August 1975, the Montoneros planted a bomb in a culvert at the airstrip of Tucumán's air base. The blast destroyed an air force C-130 transport carrying 116 anti-guerrilla commandos of the Argentine National Gendarmerie (internal security of Argentina's armed forces), killing five and wounding 40, one of whom later died of his injuries.

By this time, the network of Montoneros militants had been largely uprooted by the government in the capital of Tucumán province. In August 1975, several hundred Montoneros militants took to the streets in Córdoba to divert attention from the military operations being waged in the mountains of Tucumán. The Montoneros shot and killed five policemen—Sergeant Juan Carlos Román, Corporal Rosario del Carmen Moyano and Agents Luis Rodolfo López, Jorge Natividad Luna and Juan Antonio Díaz—after attacking their headquarters and bombing the police radio communications center. As a result, the Argentine army's elite 4th Airborne Infantry Brigade, which had been ordered to assist operations in Tucumán province, was kept in Córdoba for the rest of the year.

On 5 October 1975, the Montoneros carried out a complex operation against a regiment of the Argentine army's 5th Brigade. During this attack, named Operation Primicia ("Operation Scoop"), a Montoneros force—numbering an estimated several hundred guerrillas and underground supporters—launched an assault on an army barracks in Formosa Province. On 5 October 1975, Montoneros members hijacked a civilian airliner bound for Corrientes from Buenos Aires. The guerrillas redirected the plane to Formosa, and they took over the provincial airport, killing policeman Neri Argentino Alegre in the process. With tactical support from a local militant group, the invaders attacked the barracks of the Argentine army's 29th Infantry Regiment with gunfire and hand grenades. The Montoneros shot several soldiers who had been resting in their quarters.

After the soldiers and non-commissioned officers (NCOs) recovered from their initial surprise, they mounted stiff resistance to the attacking Montoneros. A number of people were killed and several wounded: a second lieutenant (Ricardo Massaferro), a sergeant (Víctor Sanabria), and ten conscripts (Antonio Arrieta, Heriberto Avalos, José Coronel, Dante Salvatierra, Ismael Sánchez, Tomás Sánchez, Edmundo Roberto Sosa, Marcelino Torales, Alberto Villalba, and Hermindo Luna). The Montoneros lost 16 people in total. Later, two policemen died of their wounds. The Montoneros escaped by air into a remote area in neighboring Santa Fe Province. The aircraft, a Boeing 737, landed in a crop field near the city of Rafaela. The Peronist guerrillas fled to cars waiting on a highway nearby.

The sophistication of the operation—along with the getaway cars and safe houses used to escape the military crackdown—suggests the involvement of several hundred guerrillas and civilian sympathizers in the Montoneros' organization. Under the presidency of Nestor Kirchner, each family of Montoneros killed in the attack was later compensated with a payment of approximately $200,000.

While the ERP fought the Argentine army in Tucumán, the Montoneros were active in Buenos Aires. Montoneros' leadership dismissed the tactics of the ERP in Tucumán as "old-fashioned" and "inappropriate", but they still sent reinforcements. On 26 October 1975, five policemen—Pedro Dettle, Juan Ramón Costa, Carlos Livio Cejas, Cleofás Galeano, and Juan Fernández—were killed in Buenos Aires when Montoneros guerrillas ambushed their patrol cars near the San Isidro Cathedral. Two of the captured policemen were reportedly executed in this operation under the orders of Montoneros commander Eduardo Pereyra Rossi (whose nom de guerre was Carlon).

In December 1975, Montoneros raided an armaments factory in the capital's Munro neighborhood, fleeing with 250 assault rifles and submachine guns. That same month, a Montoneros bomb exploded at the headquarters of the Argentine army in Buenos Aires, injuring at least six soldiers. By the end of 1975, a total of 137 army officers, NCOs, and conscripts, as well as policemen, had been killed that year; approximately 3,000 were wounded by left-wing terrorism. American journalist Paul Hoeffel, in an article written for the newspaper The Boston Globe, concluded that, "Although there is widespread reluctance to use the term, it is now impossible to ignore the fact that civil war has broken out in Argentina."

==== Attacks on boats and ships ====
Montoneros was inspired by Italian and British commando raids on warships; and on 1 November 1974, Montoneros successfully blew up General Commissioner Alberto Villar, the chief of the Argentine Federal Police, on his yacht. His wife was also killed on the spot. On 22 August 1975, Montoneros frogmen planted a mine on the riverbed below the hull of a navy destroyer, the ARA Santísima Trinidad, while it remained docked at the Rio Santiago shipyard before commissioning. The explosion caused considerable damage to the ship's computer and electronic equipment. On 14 December 1975, using the same techniques, Montoneros frogmen placed explosives on the yacht Itati in an attempt to kill the commander-in-chief of the Argentine Navy, Admiral Emilio Massera. Although Massera was not injured, the yacht was badly damaged by the explosives.

=== 1976 ===
In January 1976, Juan Alsogaray (El Hippie)—the son of retired Lieutenant-General Julio Alsogaray—copied from his father's safe a draft of "Battle Order 24 March"; Juan passed it to the head of Montoneros intelligence, Rodolfo Walsh, who informed the guerrilla leadership about the planned military coup. Private Sergio Tarnopolsky, serving in the Argentine Marine Corps in 1976, also passed valuable information to Walsh about the torture and killing of left-wing guerrillas at Argentina's Navy Engineering School (Spanish: Escuela Superior de Mecánica de la Armada [ESMA]). Later that year, he disappeared—along with his wife Laura, father Hugo, mother Blanca, and sister Betina—in revenge for a bomb that he had planted in the detention center (but that had failed to explode). The only survivor of the disappearance was his brother Daniel, who was not at home on the day of the raid.

On 16 January, a police officer was killed while trying to remove a bomb that Montoneros planted in a train in the suburb of Hurlingham/Moron outside Buenos Aires.

On 20 January, Montoneros guerrillas set fire to and destroyed 10 buses in the suburb of La Plata outside Buenos Aires.

On 22 January, Montoneros guerrillas opened fire on the police stations of Valentín Alsina and Lanús in Argentina's capital.

On 26 January, around 7 am, urban guerrillas operating in the suburb of Barracas outside Buenos Aires shot a female police traffic officer (21-year-old Silvia Ester Rosboch de Campana) twice in the stomach as she left her residence at Tomás Liberti 1145 for work. The three people involved in her murder fled in a Peugeot 504 car. She died that day in the emergency ward at the Agudos Dr. Argerich General Hospital.

On 29 January, during a raid on the Bendix factory in the suburb of Munro outside Buenos Aires, Montoneros shot and killed three people: Alberto Olabarrieta and Jorge Sarlenga from the factory's management; and an off-duty policeman, 27-year-old Juan Carlos Garavaglio, who had tried to intervene.

During February 1976, the Montoneros sent assistance to the ERP's hard-pressed military unit Compañía de Monte Ramón Rosa Jiménez, who were fighting in Tucumán province; this assistance was in the form of a company of Montoneros' own elite "Jungle Troops", while the ERP supported them with another company of volunteers from Córdoba. The newspaper The Baltimore Sun reported at the time:

In the jungle-covered mountains of Tucumán, long known as 'Argentina's garden,' Argentines are fighting Argentines in a Vietnam-style civil war. So far, the outcome is in doubt. But there is no doubt about the seriousness of the combat, which involves 2,000 or so leftist guerrillas and perhaps as many as 10,000 soldiers.

On 2 February, about 50 Montoneros attacked the Juan Vucetich Police Academy in the suburb of La Plata, in an attempt to destroy the patrol helicopters stationed there, but the group was repelled when the police cadets fought back and reinforcements arrived. On 13 February, the Argentine army scored a major success when the 14th Airborne Infantry Regiment of the 4th Airborne Infantry Brigade ambushed the 65-person "Compañía Montoneros de Monte" (Montoneros Jungle Company) in an action near the town of Cadillal in Tucumán province. The 2nd Airborne Infantry Regiment of the same brigade was also released from garrison duties in the city of Córdoba after the ERP armed uprising that killed 5 policemen there in August 1975; this regiment would achieve similar success against the ERP's company Decididos de Córdoba (Die-Hards of Córdoba), who were sent to rekindle the insurgency in Tucumán province. In the week preceding the military coup, the Montoneros killed 13 policemen as part of their Third National Military Campaign that intended to kill at least 3,000 policemen by the decade's end.

The ERP guerrillas and their supporting network of militants came under heavy attack in April 1976; the Montoneros were forced to help them with money, weapons, and safe houses. On 21 June, Osvaldo Raúl Trinidad—the labor relations manager of Swift, an American food processing company—was shot and killed outside his home in the La Plata suburb of Buenos Aires, after coming under fire from a carload of masked Peronist gunmen. On 1 July, a carload of Montoneros shot and killed Army Sergeant Raúl Godofredo Favale in the Ramos Mejía suburb of Buenos Aires. The following day, the Montoneros detonated a powerful bomb in the Argentine Federal Police building in Buenos Aires, killing 24 people and injuring 66–100. On 10 July 1976, policemen surrounded and entered a printing house in the San Andrés suburb of Buenos Aires in an attempt to free Vice-Commodore Roberto Moisés Echegoyen from the Argentine air force; however, the alerted urban guerrillas shot their hostage in the head, killing him. On 19 July, Montoneros killed Brigadier General Carlos Omar Actis—tasked with overseeing the World Cup soccer championships in Argentina in 1978—in the suburb of Wilde in Buenos Aires. On 26 July, Montoneros guerrillas operating in the San Justo suburb of Buenos Aires shot and killed an off-duty policeman, Ramón Emilio Reno, in the presence of his 13-year-old brother while they were looking at a magazine stand. The terrorists first asked Reno to confirm his name, and then they shot him in the back before killing him with a shot to the head. An Argentine army report titled Informe Especial: Actividades OPM "Montoneros" año 1976 gave the following totals for surviving Montoneros as of September 1976: 9,191 members; 991 guerrillas (391 officers and 600 other ranks); 2,700 armed militants; and 5,500 sympathizers and active collaborators.

On 19 August 1976, Carlos Bergometti of FIAT's senior management in Córdoba was ambushed on his way to work and killed by Montoneros in a car with shotguns. On 2 September, urban guerrillas killed Lieutenant-Colonel Carlos Heriberto Astudillo in the suburb of Escobar outside Buenos Aires. On 7 September, Daniel Andrés Cash of the Banco de la Nación Argentina (Argentine national bank) was killed on his way to work by a Montoneros guerrilla with a shotgun. On 12 September 1976, a Montoneros car bomb destroyed a bus carrying police officers in Rosario, killing nine policemen and a married couple—56-year-old Oscar Walter Ledesma and 42-year-old Irene Ángela Dib. At least 50 people were wounded. Among the wounded were 23 policemen travelling on the bus. On 8 October 1976, First Lieutenant Fernando Cativa-Tolosa of the Argentine army's 601st Air Defence Regiment noticed a light-blue FIAT vehicle (believed to be used by urban guerrillas) parked in the suburb of Don Bosco outside Buenos Aires; he then exited his patrol vehicle while the remainder of his squad remained inside. The army officer entered the Real Madrid Restaurant to visually identify potential suspects. But Raúl Del Monte and Ignacio Suárez, two Montoneros sitting at a table, drew their handguns first; although Cativa-Tolosa fired back, he was shot six times and killed. His two-man backup team soon joined the gunfight, but they were also shot and wounded. On 17 October, a Montoneros bomb blast in a Círculo Militar (lit. 'Military Circle') cinema in downtown Buenos Aires killed 14 people, and it wounded about 30 military officers and their relatives. On 9 November, three police officers were killed, and 11 were wounded when a Montoneros bomb exploded at police headquarters in La Plata during a meeting of Buenos Aires police chiefs.

On 16 November 1976, about 40 Montoneros guerrillas stormed the police station at Arana, 30 miles south of Buenos Aires. Five policemen and one army captain were wounded in the battle, with 17 guerrillas reported killed in the initial assault and follow-up counterinsurgency operations that day. On 15 December, another Montoneros bomb planted in a Ministry of Defense movie hall killed or wounded 44 officers and their accompanying family members. On 29 December, urban guerrillas shot and killed Colonel Francisco Castellanos and wounded his driver, Private Alberto Gutiérrez, just a few blocks from the army officer's home in the suburb of Florida outside Buenos Aires. In the worst year of the insurgency—1976—156 army officers, NCOs, and conscripts, and police were killed.

By the time that Jorge Rafael Videla's military junta took power in March 1976, approximately five thousand prisoners were being held in prisons around Argentina—some with connections and some guilty by association. In total, 12,000 Argentines were detained during the military dictatorship and became known as the detenidos-desaparecidos (lit. 'detained-disappeared ones'); however, they survived after international pressure forced the Argentine military authorities to release them. These prisoners were held through the years of dictatorship, many of them never receiving trials, in prisons such as La Plata, Devoto, Rawson, and Caseros. Justice Minister Ricardo Gil Lavedra, who was part of the 1985 tribunal judging military crimes committed during Argentina's Dirty War, later went on record saying that "I sincerely believe that the majority of the victims of the illegal repression were guerrilla militants".

Terence Roehrig estimates that of the disappeared in Argentina, "at least 10,000 were involved in various ways with the guerrillas". The Montoneros later admitted that 5,000 of their guerrillas were killed; the ERP admitted that another 5,000 of their own combatants were killed.

According to a declassified "Dirección de Inteligencia Nacional" (National Intelligence Directorate or DINA) cable at the time, the total number of people killed or missing in Argentina was 22,000 between 1975 and mid-1978.Admittedly there were 12,000 disappeared in the form of PEN detainees that survived the Argentine dictatorship, thanks to international pressure to release them from the clandestine detention camps.

Approximately 11,000 Argentines have applied for and received up to US$200,000 each as compensation for the loss of loved ones during the military dictatorship. In late November 2012, it was reported that the government of Cristina Fernández de Kirchner would approve monetary compensation for families who lost loved ones in the Montoneros attack on the 29th Regiment barracks on 5 October 1975—the first compensation of its kind for military families in Argentina.

About the Montoneros' numbers in 1975, Roberto Perdía stated:

The political force the Montoneros represented, that is to say, those who were mobilized around the organized members of the group, can be measured by the participation in public actions. Given the fact that actions took place across the country, the total number of participants can be estimated at around one hundred and twenty thousand, counting sympathizers as well as organized and non-organized members.

He estimated the number of active militants at 10,000, including 3,000 women.

=== Under Videla's junta ===
On 24 March 1976, Isabel Perón was ousted, and a military junta led by General Jorge Rafael Videla was installed. On 4 April 1976, Montoneros assassinated a naval commander (José Guillermo Burgos) and a Chrysler executive (Jorge Ricardo Kenny), and they ambushed and killed three policemen in a patrol car. On 26 April 1976, Montoneros guerrillas killed Colonel Abel Héctor Elías Cavagnaro outside his home in Tucumán province. On 27 June 1976, Montoneros guerrillas operating in the city of Rosario ambushed and destroyed two police cars, killing three police officers. During the first three months of the military government, more than 70 policemen were killed in leftist guerrilla attacks. On 11 August 1976, urban guerrillas dressed as police officers intercepted and killed army corporal Jorge Antonio Bulacio with two shots to the head, and they used a Molotov cocktail to set fire to his lorry belonging to the Argentine Army's 141st Headquarters Communications Battalion. On 3 November 1976, Montoneros killed a Chrysler executive, Carlos Roberto Souto, in Buenos Aires.

On 4 January 1977, a female guerrilla (Ana María González) from Montoneros shot and killed Private Guillermo Félix Dimitri of the Argentine army's 10th Motorized Infantry Brigade while he was on roadblock duty outside the Chrysler factory in the San Justo suburb of Buenos Aires. On 27 January, a Montoneros bomb exploded outside a police station in the city of Rosario in Santa Fe Province; the bomb killed a policeman (Miguel Angel Bracamonte) and a 15-year-old girl (María Leonor Berardi), an innocent bystander. On 28 January, a female Montoneros guerrilla (22-year-old Juana Silvia Charura) placed a bomb inside the 2nd Police Station in the suburb of Ciudadela outside Buenos Aires, destroying the building and killing three policemen: Commissioner Carlos A. Benítez, Subcommissioner Lorenzo Bonnani, and Agent César Landeria.

On 10 February, two police officers (Roque Alipio Farías and Ernesto Olivera) from an anti-explosives unit were fatally wounded while attempting to deactivate a bomb rigged to a motorbike in Rosario. On 15 February 1977, army corporal Osvaldo Ramón Ríos was killed after his patrol came under fire from three Montoneros gunmen who had barricaded themselves inside a house in the Ezpeleta suburb of Buenos Aires. On 17 February 1977 around 6:30 am local time, Ireneo Garnica and Alejandro Díaz—railway workers who had refused to participate in a strike—were killed by a Montoneros bomb thrown from a car in the suburb of Quilmes outside Buenos Aires. On 19 March 1977, 45-year-old Sergeant Martín A. Novau from the Federal Police was shot and killed while repairing a police car in a workshop in Buenos Aires.

On 5 April 1977, a female Montoneros militant (Patricia Palazuelos) planted a bomb inside the Argentine Air Force Headquarters, causing serious damage to the Cóndor Building in downtown Buenos Aires. Three years after this attack, in December 1980, the right side of the Cóndor Building suffered a collapse of ten stories due to the structural damage exacerbated by heavy rains, killing 17 and injuring dozens of civilians.

On 23 May 1977, urban guerrillas in Buenos Aires killed two police officers and a retired inspector as he entered his home.

The Argentine junta redoubled the Dirty War's anti-guerrilla campaign. During 1977, in Buenos Aires alone, 36 police were reported killed in actions involving the remaining urban guerrillas.

On 1 August 1978, a powerful bomb meant to kill Rear Admiral Armando Lambruschini (Chief of the Joint Chiefs of Staff of the Armed Forces) ripped through a nine-story apartment building, killing three civilians and trapping scores beneath the debris.

On 14 August 1977, Susana Leonor Siver and her partner Marcelo Carlos Reinhold, both Montoneros fighters—along with a friend—were kidnapped from Reinhold's mother's home by a fifteen-person naval intelligence team; they were taken to the Escuela Superior de Mecánica de la Armada (transl. Higher School of Mechanics of the Navy; ESMA) naval detention camp. After a brutal torture session in front of his wife, Marcelo was supposedly "transferred" to another camp, but he was not heard of again. In February 1978, Susana was disappeared by the military authorities soon after giving birth to a blonde girl.

Adriana and Gaspar Tasca, both identified as Montoneros, were taken into custody between 7 and 10 December 1977, and they remain unaccounted for. On 16 December 1977, a Montoneros hit-squad operating in Buenos Aires killed Andre Gasparoux, a top executive of the Peugeot Motor Company, and seriously wounded his bodyguard. The seven guerrillas involved, including two women, ambushed the 55-year-old French national in the suburb of Ranelagh; after using a truck to block his route, they sprayed his car with submachine gun fire before escaping.

On 6 October 1978, José Pérez Rojo and Patricia Roisinblit, both Montoneros members, were made to disappear. According to various sources, 8,000 to 30,000 people are estimated to have disappeared and died during the military dictatorship that ruled Argentina from 1976 to 1983. Approximately 12,000 of the missing—known as the detenidos-desaparecidos—survived detention and were later compensated for their ordeals. By contrast—according to an NGO dedicated to defending "victims of terrorism"—1,355 people, including members of the police and military, were killed by Montoneros and other left-wing armed movements.

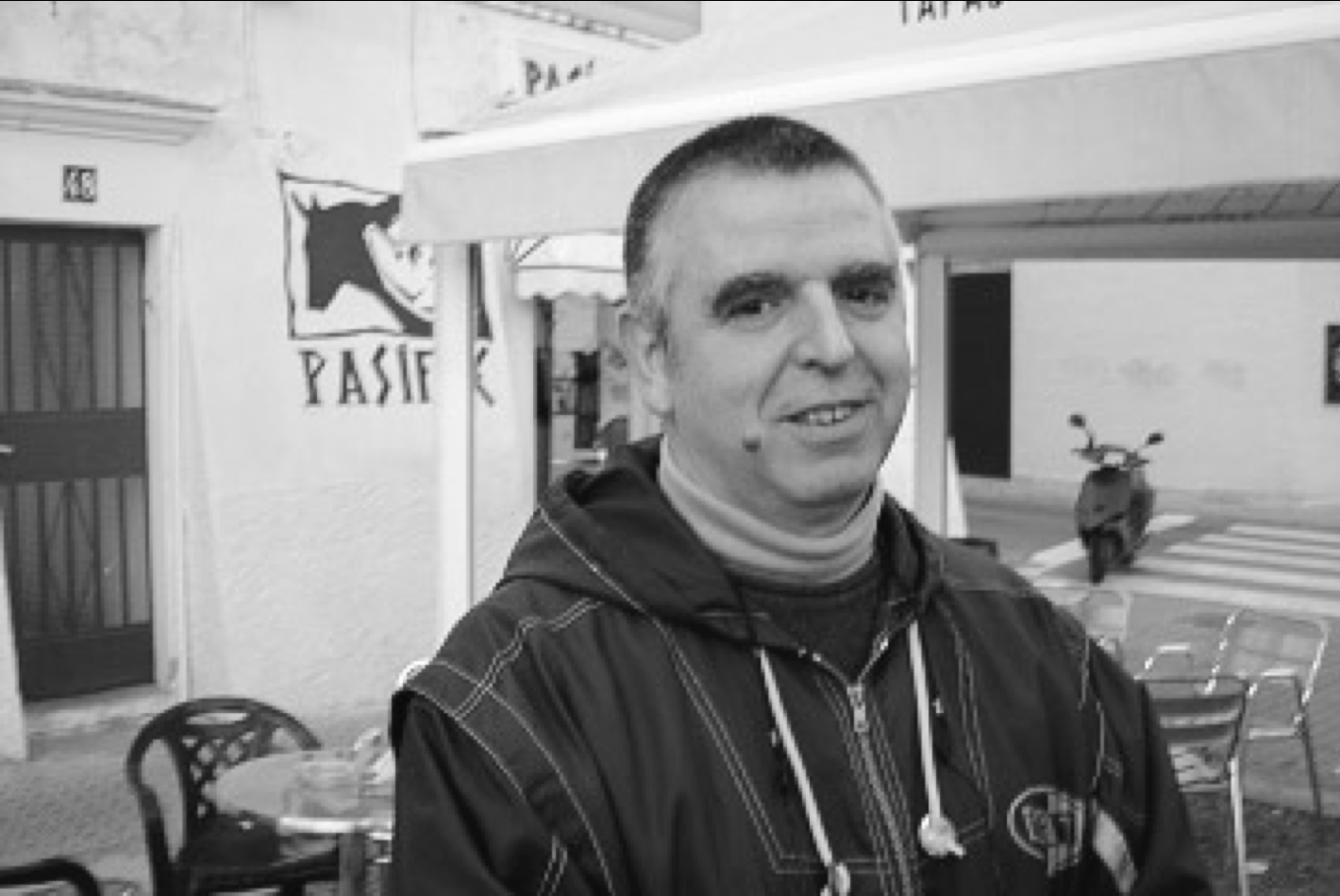
Mario Firmenich, commander of Montoneros (Photo by Eduardo Montes-Bradley)

The commander of the Montoneros, Mario Firmenich, stated in a radio interview from Spain in late 2000 that "In a country that has experienced a civil war, everybody has blood on their hands." The junta relied on mass illegal arrests, torture, and executions without trial to stifle any political opposition. Some victims were thrown from transport planes into the Atlantic Ocean on what have become known as death flights. Other victims had their corpses left on streets to intimidate other people. The Montoneros estimated that 5,000 of their guerrillas were killed.

The Montoneros were effectively finished by 1977, though their "special forces" did fight on until 1981. The Montoneros tried to disrupt the FIFA World Cup (football tournament) hosted by Argentina in 1978 by launching a number of bomb attacks. In late 1979, the Montoneros launched a "strategic counteroffensive" in Argentina; the security forces killed more than one hundred of the exiled Montoneros, who had been returned to Argentina after receiving special forces training in camps in the Middle East. On 14 June 1980, eight Argentine army officers (in cooperation with Peruvian military authorities) kidnapped Noemí Esther Giannetti de Molfino (an active Montoneros collaborator), along with eight Argentine nationals, in Peru's capital city Lima and had them forcibly disappeared. Several decades later, in October 2014, the President Cristina Fernández de Kirchner renamed a street in the city of Resistencia, Chaco Province, in de Molfino's memory. De Molfino's daughter (Marcela) and partner (Guillermo Amarilla) had both disappeared in 1979 while re-entering Argentina as part of the Montoneros "strategic counteroffensive".

Among the Montoneros killed in this operation were Luis Francisco Goya and María Lourdes Martínez Aranda; after crossing the Chilean border into Argentina, they were abducted in the city of Mendoza in 1980, and they were never seen again. Their son Jorge Guillermo was adopted and raised by an army NCO, Luis Alberto Tejada, and his wife Raquel Quinteros.In 2011, Jorge Guillermo openly defended both Tejada and Quinteros, making two comments: Tejada had adopted him only because Tejada feared that the young child would end up in an orphanage, and his adoptive mother was not involved with the military decision but chose to raise Jorge Guillermo as her own child.

During the 1980s, a captured Sandinista commando revealed that Montoneros "special forces" were training Sandinista frogmen and conducting gun runs across the Gulf of Fonseca to Sandinista allies in El Salvador—guerrillas of the Farabundo Martí National Liberation Front (Spanish: Frente Farabundo Martí para la Liberación Nacional [FMLN]).

In 1977, the Montoneros regrouped in Cuba, where the bulk of the remaining group's money had been transferred as well. Exiled Montoneros expanded their networks to gradually diminish the influence of far-right Orthodox Peronism on the Peronist movement. According to Montoneros, Peronism could be reformed by "correcting the reason" of Isabel Perón and José López Rega, as well as committing to a platform centered on labor corporatism, Catholic socialism, and anti-imperialism. Near the end of the 1970s, exiled Montoneros participated in the Nicaraguan Revolution and allied with the Sandinista National Liberation Front, a fellow Christian socialist movement. Montoneros fought directly for the Sandinista revolution, and a special Montoneros medical unit was created by the Sandinistas.

During the Falklands War against Great Britain, the Argentine military conceived the aborted Operation Algeciras, a covert plan to support and convince some commando-trained Montoneros—by appealing to their patriotism—to sabotage British military facilities in Gibraltar. Argentina's defeat led to the fall of the junta; Raúl Alfonsín became president in December 1983, thereby initiating a democratic transition.

== Members ==
- Esther Norma Arrostito
- Sylvia Bermann
- Dardo Cabo
- Nilda Garré
- Juan Gelman
- Carlos Kunkel
- Héctor Germán Oesterheld
- Jorge Taiana
- Francisco Urondo
- Horacio Verbitsky
- Rodolfo Walsh

=== Estimated numbers of guerrilla fighters and disappeared people ===
The US embassy in Buenos Aires estimated that Montoneros had around 2,000 armed combatants at the beginning of 1975.

According to a secret cable from DINA (Chilean secret police) in Buenos Aires, an estimate by the Argentine 601st Intelligence Battalion in mid-July 1978, which started counting victims in 1975, gave the figure of 22,000 persons – this document was first published by John Dinges in 2004.The DINA cable states, "Se tienen computados 22.000 entre muertos y desaparecidos desde 1975 a la fecha," which does not distinguish between confirmed dead and disappeared individuals still being held alive in clandestine detention centres. The secret police report does not definitively confirm that all 22,000 were deceased at the time of writing, nor does it mention a pending grant of PEN detainee status under pressure from outside Argentina.

In 1983, the government of General Reynaldo Bignone stated that the total number of pro-guerrilla militants throughout the country had reached 25,000, of whom 15,000 were allegedly armed combatants. This latter estimate, contained in the government's so-called Final Document, contradicted earlier intelligence that had counted a total of 300 to 400 Montoneros combatants in 1977. The conclusions of the Final Document have been rejected by several authors, particularly Prudencio García, who places the guerrillas' combat capacity at 1,000 to 1,300 permanent armed fighters. Other English-language authors maintain that the Montoneros guerrilla organization had more than 5,000 fighters. Montoneros was certainly one of the hardest-hit organizations, acknowledging the loss of 5,000 members.

The Montoneros were reportedly the most significant guerrilla force in Argentina during the 1970s and early 1980s. They were responsible for the majority of the 21,000 attacks by the militant left—including killings, kidnappings, and attacks on military barracks and police stations, as well as 5,215 documented bombings throughout Argentina.

In 1979, Amnesty International claimed that 15,000 Argentines had been forcibly disappeared, according to the records of the various Human rights organizations with 600 abductions reported having taking place in 1978 and another 36 Argentines reported missing the following year. In the newspaper The New York Times, reporter David Vidal wrote on 5 January 1979 that the number of people disappeared throughout Latin America during that period numbered 30,000.The newspapers The Christian Science Monitor and The Boston Globe soon followed suit with similar stories, claiming that 30,000 people had disappeared under military dictatorships in Latin America, not only Argentina.The newspaper The Los Angeles Times repeated the claims about 30,000 Latin Americans—not only Argentines—disappeared in new articles published in October and November 1979.

In 2003, the Argentine Secretariat of Human Rights claimed the true number of disappeared to be approximately 13,000.The mainstream media often cite a Chilean Secret Police (DINA) report of an estimate by the Argentine Army's 601st Intelligence Battalion (Batallón de Inteligencia 601): 22,000 disappeared between 1975 and mid-1978, implying all of these people were killed. However, other reports reveal that during this period there were at least 12,000 detenidos-desaparecidos held under National Executive Power (Poder Ejecutivo Nacional or PEN), locked up in several detention camps throughout Argentina, but eventually freed under diplomatic pressure.

In 2012, former dictator Jorge Rafael Videla, in an interview with Argentine journalist Ceferino Reato, acknowledged 7,000–8,000 disappeared who were killed by the military and the police. That number is consistent with the number of fully documented, named cases originally registered by Argentina's National Commission on the Disappearance of Persons (Spanish: Comisión Nacional sobre la Desaparición de Personas [CONADEP]) in 1984—approximately 8,900 people.

== See also ==
- Clandestine detention center (Argentina)
- Peronist Armed Forces

== Sources ==
- Brown, Jonathan C. 2010. A brief history of Argentina. 2nd edition. Facts on File, Inc.
- Soldiers of Perón: Argentina's Montoneros, by Richard Gillespie (1982).
- Giussani, Pablo (2011). Montoneros: La soberbia armada. Buenos Aires: Sudamericana. ISBN 978-950-07-3620-6.
- Argentina, 1943–1987: The National Revolution and Resistance, by Donald C. Hodges (1988).
- Guerrillas and Generals: The Dirty War in Argentina, by Paul H. Lewis (2001).
- Guerrilla politics in Argentina, by Kenneth F. Johnson (1975).
- Argentina's Lost Patrol: Armed Struggle 1969–1979 by María José Moyano (1995).
- Guerrilla warfare in Argentina and Colombia, 1974–1982, by Bynum E. Weathers, Jr. (1982).
