= Operation Primicia =

1975 guerrilla attack on the Argentine Army

- Part of the Dirty War
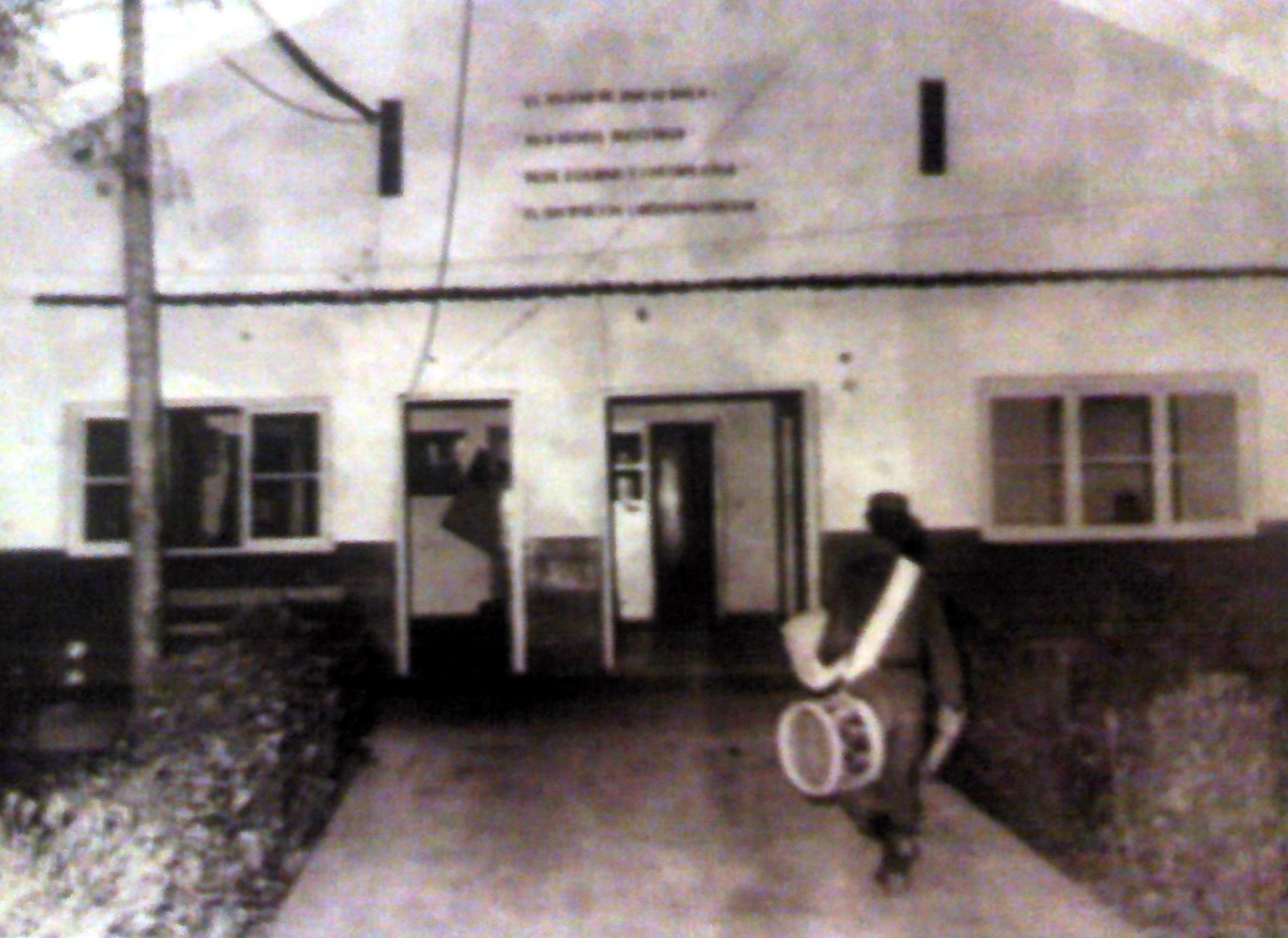
- Entrance to the barracks (1975)
Date	5 October 1975
Location	Formosa, Argentina

Belligerents
Montoneros	Argentine Army

Casualties and losses
15 killed	12 killed
- 3 civilians killed

Operation Primicia ("Scoop") was a large guerrilla assault that took place on 5 October 1975, in Formosa, Argentina. It was the largest attack ever launched by the paramilitary group Montoneros, which attempted to seize the barracks of the 29th Forest Infantry Regiment. The incident escalated the Dirty War, which led to the 1976 Argentine coup d'état the following year.

== Overview ==
The attack was carried out in five phases. As a first step, Montoneros hijacked a flight of Aerolíneas Argentinas from the province of Corrientes (with 102 passengers and six crew). Then the airliner, a Boeing 737-200, was redirected to Formosa. The Formosa International Airport was captured at the same time by Montoneros gunmen already in the province. During this initial attack they fired a rocket propelled grenade at a police patrol vehicle, killing a police officer and wounding another. The group held 200 hostages at the airport. Then, they assaulted the 29th Infantry Regiment.

The surviving militants escaped in the Boeing and a Cessna 182. The Boeing landed in the countryside near Rafaela, Santa Fe Province, and the Cessna in a ricefield in Corrientes Province.

The attack was planned by Raúl Yaguer and approved by Montoneros' commanders Mario Firmenich, Roberto Perdía and Roberto Quieto.

== Attack on the barracks ==
Montoneros attacked the Regiment facilities at 16:25, the time of the local siesta. Most military personnel were on leave: some of them had a day off, and others were sleeping at the military neighbourhood next to the regiment. Montoneros thought that the remaining soldiers, most of them just young conscripts, would join them, but they did not. Ten conscripts and two policemen died during the attack, and a total of 28 people died during the whole operation. Montoneros expected to seize some 200 FN FAL assault rifles, but could only take 50.

== Consequences ==
The acting president of Argentina at that time was Ítalo Lúder, as Isabel Perón had taken a leave of absence. Lúder signed three decrees urging the military to "annihilate the subversive elements". The armed forces were already waging the Operativo Independencia against the Maoist ERP in the Tucumán Province. This decree expanded their area of operations to the whole country.

There was wide support for Lúder to stay as president, but Isabel Perón returned to the presidency. The military deposed her during the 1976 Argentine coup d'état, and continued the Dirty War during the National Reorganization Process. Montoneros and ERP were eventually defeated. The military fell from power in 1983, and the National Commission on the Disappearance of Persons (CONADEP) listed several thousand forced disappearances carried out by the military during the conflict with the guerrillas.

The late president Néstor Kirchner made a controversial change to the CONADEP report in 2006. He included the gunmen that died during the attacks as victims of state terrorism, allowing their relatives to receive state compensations.
