= Timote =

Human settlement in Argentina

Coordinates: 35°21′S 62°13′W

Timote is a settlement in Carlos Tejedor partido, Buenos Aires Province, Argentina.

== Location ==
It is 18 km east from Carlos Tejedor, its accesses are over 68 and 70 Provincial Roads.

== Population ==
According to 2010 INDEC National Census, there are 526 persons, what represents an increase of 3,3% over 509 in 2001 census.

== History ==
In 1876, in Foromalán lagoon shore, Conrado E. Villegas founded Capitán Timote Fort in honour to Lieutenant Colonel Pedro Timote, born in Buenos Aires in 1836 and killed in Santa Rosa battle (1874).

== Pedro Eugenio Aramburu murder ==
In Timote, in La Celma estate, on June 1, 1970, the body of the de facto ex-president and dictator Pedro Eugenio Aramburu (1955-1958) was found, after being kidnapped and killed by the Argentine leftist urban guerrilla Montoneros.
