= Dardo Cabo =

Argentine journalist and activist

Dardo Manuel Cabo (January 1, 1941 - c. January 6, 1977) was an Argentine journalist, activist and militant. Born in the city of Tres Arroyos, he was the son of a notable metalworkers' union leader, Armando Cabo. Dardo Cabo started political activism in the Movimiento Nacionalista Tacuara (MNT), a far-right youth group of the 1960s. Just like several other members of the MNT, he progressively embraced Peronism, and created in 1961 the Movimiento Nueva Argentina, a Peronist right-wing organization.

Dardo Cabo came to be famous when he hijacked, together with other militants, an Aerolíneas Argentinas' plane on September 28, 1966, and diverted it towards the Malvinas Islands [Falkland Islands], where he planted the Argentinian flag, during the so-called 1966 Aerolineas Argentinas DC-4 hijacking Operation Condor. He was then sentenced to three years in prison for this feat, and married there.

Once freed, Dardo Cabo became the leader of the organization Descamisados, which later merged with Montoneros, a left-wing Peronist organization group, which become allied with the Fuerzas Armadas Revolucionarias (Revolutionary Armed Forces), a "guevarista" (Che Guevara) organization (FAR-Montoneros).

He was abducted by the military junta commanded by dictator Jorge Rafael Videla's [National Reorganization Process], because of his political activities, and finally executed in January 1977 alongside Roberto Rufino Pirles in the outskirts of La Plata.

== See also ==
- Dirty War
- Peronism
- Movimiento Nacionalista Tacuara
- Esther Norma Arrostito
