= Operation Algeciras =

Argentine plan to sabotage a British warship in Gibraltar

Coordinates: 36°7′52″N 5°23′46″W

- Part of the Falklands War
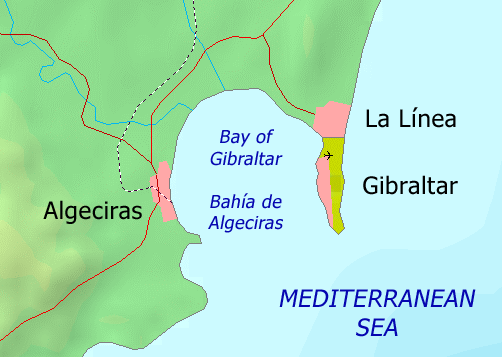
- Type: Argentine diversionary sabotage
- Location: Algeciras, Cádiz; Bay of Gibraltar
- Planned by: Admiral Jorge Anaya
- Objective: Diversion of British resources through sabotage of a Royal Navy warship
- Date: 24 April – 4 May 1982
- Executed by: Peronist Montonero Movement
- Outcome: Unit captured before execution

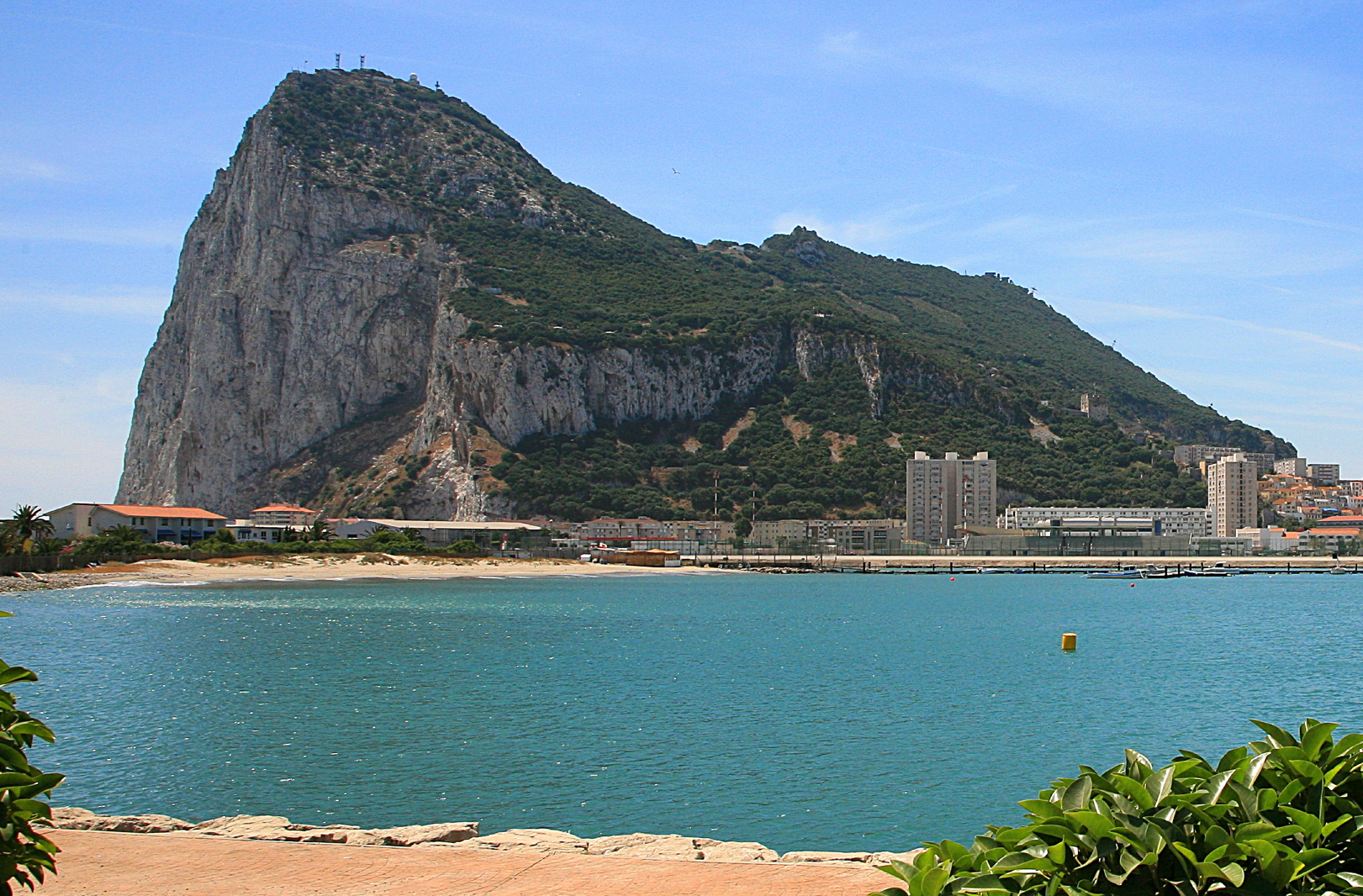
Gibraltar

Operation Algeciras was a failed Argentine plan to sabotage a Royal Navy warship in Gibraltar during the Falklands War. The Argentine reasoning was that if the British military felt vulnerable in Europe, they would decide to keep some vessels in European waters rather than send them to the Falklands.

A commando team observed British naval traffic in the area from Spain during 1982, waiting to attack a target of opportunity when ordered, using frogmen and Italian limpet mines.

The plan was to launch divers from Algeciras, have them swim across the bay, to Gibraltar, under cover of darkness, attach the mines to a British naval ship and swim back to Algeciras. The timed detonators would cause the mines to explode after the divers had time to safely swim back across the bay. The plan was foiled when the Spanish police became suspicious of their behaviour and arrested them before any attack could be mounted.

== Background ==
=== Planning ===
The operation was conceived, ordered and directly managed by Admiral Jorge Anaya, who at the time was a member of the National Reorganization Process and head of the Argentine Navy. The plan was top secret and not shared with other members of the government. Anaya summoned to his office Admiral Eduardo Morris Girling, who was responsible for the Naval Intelligence Service, and explained to him the convenience of hitting the Royal Navy in Europe. Girling would be the one who would make the plan and select the participants but Anaya remained in charge of the operation throughout.

Striking in the United Kingdom was considered at first but it was thought that the commandos would have difficulty remaining unnoticed and Spain was chosen because the commandos could more easily pass unnoticed as tourists.

=== Participants ===
The leader of the operation was Héctor Rosales, a spy and former naval officer. He was in charge but would not participate in the actual placing of the mines which was left to the experts. Three former members of the Peronist guerrilla Montoneros were convinced to participate in spite of the earlier repression of the Montoneros by the military.

The leader of the commandos was Máximo Nicoletti, a diver and expert in underwater explosives. His father served in the Italian Navy's underwater demolition team during the Second World War and thereafter owned a diving business. In the early '70s Nicoletti had joined the Montoneros and engaged in urban insurgent actions against the military junta. On 1 November 1974, Nicoletti placed a remote-controlled bomb under the yacht of the police chief of the Argentine Federal Police, Alberto Villar, who was killed together with his wife.

On 22 September 1975, while the destroyer ARA Santísima Trinidad was still under construction in Buenos Aires, Nicoletti placed an explosive charge under the hull which caused it to sink. Later in the decade, Nicoletti was arrested by the infamous Grupo de Tareas 3.3.2 of the Navy Mechanics School, but escaped serious punishment by cooperating with the authorities.

Soon, due to his cooperation and expertise, he managed to get himself appointed to carry out a similar submarine attack against a Chilean ship because tensions between Chile and Argentina were high due to the Beagle dispute. This attack was not carried out in the end because the disagreement between Chile and Argentina was finally resolved peacefully. Nicoletti was then sent to Venezuela as a spy but he was discovered and had to return to Argentina. Shortly after he settled in Miami, but when he heard of the Argentine invasion of the Falkland Islands he immediately got in touch with the Argentinian government in case his services were needed and he was instructed to return to Buenos Aires.

The other two commandos, both also ex-Montoneros, were Antonio Nelson Latorre and another man who went by "Marciano," subsequently revealed to be Abel Adolfo Ojeda. Both had participated with Nicoletti in earlier sabotage plans. In the event of capture, Argentina would deny all knowledge. The agents were to say they were Argentine patriots acting on their own. They had orders not to do anything which could involve or embarrass Spain, to sink a British naval vessel and to get express approval from Anaya before carrying out any attack.

When planning the operation in Argentina it was decided that acquiring or manufacturing explosives in Spain would prove too difficult and so two explosive mines with timed detonators would be shipped to Spain via diplomatic pouch and would be delivered to the commando group in Spain. Italian limpet mines were acquired for this purpose and shipped to Spain in diplomatic pouch as planned.

=== Situation in Spain ===
At that time the political climate in Spain was unstable with the government of Leopoldo Calvo Sotelo having political difficulties on many fronts, including with the military who mistrusted him. The trials for those responsible for the military coup attempt of 23-F a year earlier were concluding and this further raised tensions. The Basque terror group, Euskadi Ta Askatasuna, were very active and police checkpoints were common.

The upcoming 1982 FIFA World Cup in Spain meant the police were very alert to any suspicious or terrorist activity. The police requested that everybody remain vigilant, and that people should report anything unusual, especially within the travel industry.

== Execution ==
=== Infiltration ===
The commandos were issued counterfeit Argentine passports under false names and marked with false earlier entry stamps to Spain. This was done so the Argentine government could deny any involvement in case the commandos were discovered, and the passports were made by another former Montonero, Víctor Basterra.

On 24 April, Nicoletti and Latorre left Buenos Aires for Paris where Latorre's passport raised the suspicions of French authorities, but they were allowed to continue their onward travel by air to Málaga. They carried the closed-circuit, military scuba gear in their luggage and passed through Spanish customs control without raising suspicion. They carried a substantial amount of US dollars and paid for everything in cash. They both checked into a hotel in Estepona and spent some days reconnoitring the area, after which they travelled to Madrid in a rented car to meet Rosales and Marciano. They then rented another two cars whilst in Madrid and went to the office of the Argentine Naval attaché to pick up the mines.

While in Spain, the commandos communicated daily by telephone with the Naval Attaché of the Argentine embassy in Madrid, who in turn would relay everything back to his superiors in Buenos Aires. The four-man commando group, travelling in three cars, moved southwards along the main roads. The mines were carried in a bag in the boot of a car, despite their telltale shape and appearance. While plausible cover stories could be invented for the specialised military scuba gear, there was no way to explain the explosives, and the team was careful to avoid the Spanish police on the roads.

The operatives travelled to the south of Spain separately; Nicoletti went ahead as a scout, the other two cars ten minutes apart. They had no way to communicate between cars except visually. Nicoletti encountered a police checkpoint and turned around to warn his accomplices, but even though he signalled them, the first car behind him did not see him and continued until the checkpoint and turned around. They all met up again, their U-turns having gone unnoticed by the police officers manning the checkpoint. They then continued south using minor roads to minimise the chance of running into police again.

=== Algeciras ===
When they were near Algeciras, they booked separately into three different hotels in the town, and changed hotels often over the next few weeks. They paid their bills weekly in cash, which after a while raised suspicions, leading to their arrest. They kept the explosives in one of the cars and used only the other two for transport. For the first few days, they surveyed Algeciras Bay in search of the best place to enter the water and to observe maritime traffic in and out of Gibraltar. There was not as much British security in Gibraltar as they had expected: two sentry posts were unmanned, and only one small Royal Navy patrol craft was observed guarding the waters of the port.

They bought an inflatable raft to cross part of the bay, and a telescope and fishing tackle to give cover to their activities. The plan was to enter the water at 18:00, swim across, plant the mines around midnight, and swim back by about 05:00. The mines would explode a short while afterwards. They would then drive north to Barcelona, cross into France, then Italy, and fly back to Argentina from there.

=== Aborted attempts ===
The first opportunity came when a British minesweeper entered Gibraltar, but Anaya did not consider the target worth the effort. A few days later, Nicoletti suggested sinking a large oil tanker with non-British flag, as it would block the port of Gibraltar, but Anaya decided against it, since an oil spill and environmental disaster could provoke outrage in Spain, especially if it damaged the tourism industry, and could affect other Mediterranean countries.

For weeks, the commandos continued their routine of changing hotels and renewing their car rental. At the time, the British task force was already sailing south towards the Falklands. Finally, a high-value target, the frigate HMS Ariadne, arrived in Gibraltar on 2 May 1982, but Anaya again refused permission to attack it, this time because Peruvian President Fernando Belaúnde had just produced a comprehensive peace plan that Anaya believed might produce a peaceful resolution to the conflict, which could be undermined by a successful attack in Gibraltar.

Later that day, the Argentine cruiser ARA General Belgrano was attacked and sunk by the British attack submarine HMS Conqueror, with substantial loss of life to the Argentine armed forces. The following day, 3 May, Nicoletti anticipated that permission would now be granted by Anaya as fighting had now had broken out in the South Atlantic Ocean, and asked if the team could claim to be acting for the Argentine military if they were caught. This was refused but they were ordered to execute the plan of attack.

== Outcome ==
=== Capture ===
The following day, Nicoletti slept late, as he usually did because the plan was to act at night, while Latorre and Rosales went to the car rental agency to extend the rental for another week. The owner of the rental business, Manuel Rojas, had become suspicious on previous encounters. He noticed that the man had keys with him for cars rented in other car rental businesses, that he always paid in cash using US dollars and that he never came in exactly when he said he would but rather would come in earlier or later.

Rojas had contacted the police, who asked him to call them next time the man came by and to try to keep him there until they arrived. Rojas notified the police and the men were arrested. The police then went to arrest the other two men and they found Nicoletti and Marciano still asleep. The police initially thought they had apprehended a gang of common criminals but, in spite of the orders not to do so, Nicoletti soon told police that they were Argentine agents.

The Minister of Interior, Juan José Rosón, instructed Málaga police chief Miguel Catalán to keep the arrests secret. The Spanish government decided to expel the four men without penalty or prosecution to avoid publicity. The police were ordered to take the arrested men to Málaga. Nicoletti said that once the police realized they were not common criminals, their attitude changed and became more favourable. The police let Nicoletti handle the explosives, as he had training while the police had none. Then Nicoletti invited them to lunch, so the police convoy, still carrying the explosives, stopped at a roadside restaurant. Then they went to pick up some clothes at a dry cleaners and finally headed for the Málaga police headquarters.

=== Deportation ===
By coincidence, Prime Minister Leopoldo Calvo Sotelo was campaigning in Málaga and ordered the men quietly flown to Madrid in an airplane chartered for his campaign. The men were not interrogated or put on trial. They were flown to Madrid and on to the Canary Islands under police custody, and finally put on a flight to Buenos Aires unaccompanied and using the same passports, now known to be false. Spain had recently joined NATO and Sotelo did not want to create tensions with the UK or with Argentina; quietly returning the men to Argentina seemed the best course.

The operation was handled entirely by the Spanish police and Ministry of the Interior; the CESID (Spanish military intelligence agency) was not informed or involved. The operation was kept secret by all participants, who did not discuss it for years. The Spanish police were ordered to destroy all associated records. At the last minute, when the men were already at the airport, the police chief realised they had not taken the men's identification information and called to order photos of the men taken. At the airport, the police officers thought it would look awkward to take mug shots in public, and a friendly group photo of the commandos with the police guarding them was taken. This photo has not been found.

== Aftermath ==
An October 1983 article in The Sunday Times titled How Argentina tried to blow up the Rock exposes the basic plot but contains various errors due to the limited information about the operation available at the time.

A 2003 documentary featured interviews with Anaya, Nicoletti and other participants. In one interview, Nigel West, a British writer who specialises in covert operations, claimed that the UK, aware of the covert plans thanks to telephone taps of conversations between Argentina and its embassy in Madrid, had informed Spanish authorities of the operation ahead of time.

== In popular culture ==
The novel Rock Scorpion (2024) by Steven Taylor is inspired by Operation Algeciras.
