= Juan José Valle =

Argentine general (1904–1956)

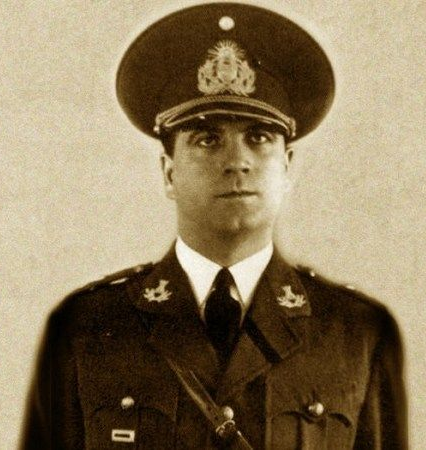
Juan José Valle

Juan José Valle (March 15, 1896 – June 12, 1956) was an Argentine general who headed a rebellion in 1956 against General Pedro Eugenio Aramburu's dictatorship.

== Rebellion ==
Aramburu's Revolución Libertadora of September 1955 had ended Juan Perón's second term of presidency. After the coup, Valle voluntarily left the army, an action that reflected the discontent of several military officers with Aramburu's regime. However, like other loyalist military officers such as Raúl Tanco, Valle was first detained in a military facility then was later transferred to house arrest. This was part of the aggressive anti-Peronist campaign, which included the government ban of the Peronist Party from future elections, the reversal of Perón's constitutional reforms, and the arrest of thousands of union leaders, among others.

He then took part in planning a counter coup and headed a rebellion on 9 June 1956, which quickly spread through the country, but resulted only in seven combat fatalities. It failed and the rebels were captured by the government forces. The failure was attributed to poor planning and the lack of personal support of Perón, who was then living in Panama.

== Execution ==
Aramburu's regime decided to make an example of José Valle by executing him by firing squad alongside other rebels, on 12 June, in the National Penitentiary of Buenos Aires. This site is currently Las Heras Park, where a plaque in his honor remains to be seen.

This execution led some sectors to name Aramburu's regime la Fusiladora (the verb fusilar meaning to execute by a firing-squad). This execution marked a turn in Argentina's history of insurrections, which were not used to such massive retaliation. Between June 9 and June 12, 1956, 27 civilians and military personnel were executed, some of them illegally during the León Suárez massacre (narrated in Rodolfo Walsh's classic non-fiction novel, Operación Masacre). This event lead to Aramburu's subsequent kidnapping and assassination by the Montoneros, a left-wing Peronist group, in June 1970.

Valle was posthumously promoted to Lieutenant-general.
