= Pedro Eugenio Aramburu =

Dictator of Argentina from 1955 to 1958

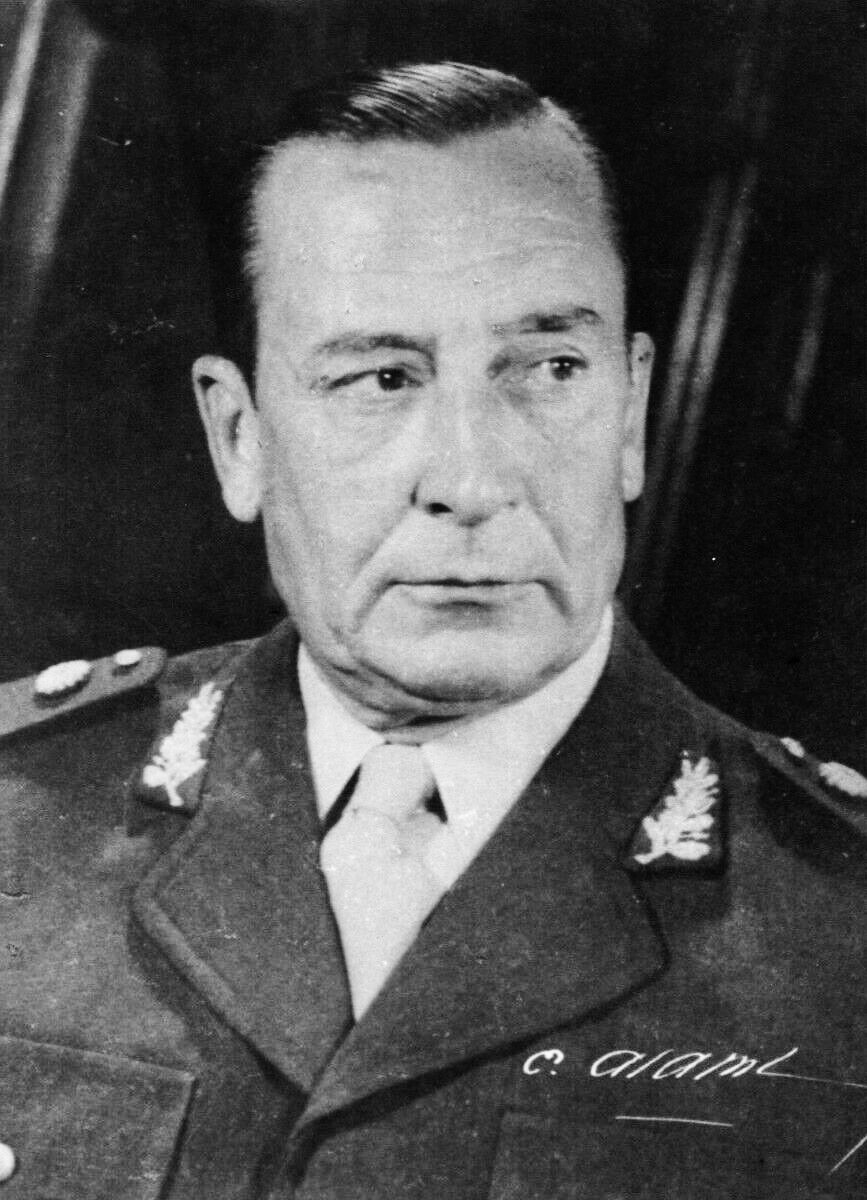
- Aramburu c. 1956

31st President of Argentina
- De facto
- In office November 13, 1955 – May 1, 1958
- Appointed by: Military junta
- Vice President: Isaac Rojas (de facto)
- Preceded by: Eduardo Lonardi (de facto)
- Succeeded by: Arturo Frondizi

Personal details
- Born: Pedro Eugenio Aramburu Silveti; May 21, 1903 Río Cuarto, Córdoba, Argentina
- Died: June 1, 1970 (aged 67) Carlos Tejedor, Buenos Aires, Argentina
- Manner of death: Assassination by firearm
- Resting place: La Recoleta Cemetery
- Party: Union of the Argentine People
- Other political affiliations: UDELPA-PDP and Missionary Alliance (1963)
- Spouse: Sara Lucía Herrera

Military service
- Allegiance: Argentina
- Branch/service: Argentine Army
- Years of service: 1922–1958
- Rank: (Pre-1991 epaulette) Lieutenant General

Pedro Eugenio Aramburu Silveti (May 21, 1903 – June 1, 1970) was an Argentine Army general and the President of Argentina from 1955 to 1958. He was a major figure behind the Revolución Libertadora, the military coup against Juan Perón in 1955. He was kidnapped by the left-wing organization Montoneros on May 29, 1970, and then murdered as part of retaliation. He had been involved in the June 1956 execution of Army General Juan José Valle—associated with the Peronist movement— and 26 Peronist militants, after a botched attempt to overthrow his regime.

== Family ==
Pedro Eugenio Aramburu Silveti was born on May 21, 1903, in Río Cuarto. Both of his parents were born in Spain. His father, Carlos Pantaleón Aramburu, was born in Zestoa, Basque Country, while his mother, Leocadia Silveti, was born in Zuriáin, Navarre. He had eight siblings.

== Military career ==
- He studied at the National Military College
- 1922: Sub-lieutenant
- 1939: Major
- 1943: War School Teacher
- 1951: Brigadier
- War School Headmaster
- 1955: Commander in Chief of the Army
- 1958: Lieutenant general.

== President of Argentina ==
He served as president of Argentina from November 13, 1955, to May 1, 1958.

The Revolución Libertadora which overthrew Juan Perón was triggered in part by his actions towards the press, as well as the imprisonment of opposition leaders and economic instability. For example, Perón incited his followers to wreck the offices and printing presses of newspapers who criticized him and he jailed the leader of the opposition, Ricardo Balbin, of the Radical Civic Union party. The military Revolución Libertadora against Perón for these actions led to three years of military rule under Aramburu, who allowed elections to be held in 1958.

Aramburu's military government forced Perón into exile and barred the Peronist Party from further elections. Perón lived in exile in Spain until 1973.

He repealed the reelectionist and statist Constitution of 1949 and restored the validity of the historical text of 1853/60, a decision that was later validated by a constituent convention. He promised to hand over power as soon as possible to a president elected by the people. He made a public commitment that none of the military who held positions in his government would accept candidacies when elections were called.

== Anti-Peronist political power ==
After the end of his presidential term in 1958, Aramburu retired from the military career and devoted himself entirely to politics.

He ran for president in 1963 as leader of the Union of the Argentine People (Unión del Pueblo Argentino, UDELPA), with the slogan "Vote UDELPA and HE won't return" ("Vote UDELPA y no vuelve"), referring to Perón.

With the Peronists banned, the Presidential elections resulted in Arturo Umberto Illia becoming president, with Aramburu coming in third.

Yet the military retained much real power, censoring both Peronism and its leader. The fragility of Argentine democracy was shown when Illia was overthrown in 1966 by a military coup led by General Juan Carlos Onganía.

In 1970, Aramburu was mentioned as a possible presidential candidate.

== Kidnapping and death ==
On May 29, 1970, at noon, Aramburu was snatched from his apartment in Buenos Aires by two members of Montoneros posing as young army officers. Montoneros dubbed the kidnapping Operación Pindapoy, after a company that produced citrus in the 1960s. Aramburu's disappearance kept Argentinian society on tenterhooks for a month before it was discovered that Aramburu had been assassinated three days after his abduction, following a mock trial and his corpse hidden inside a farmhouse near Timote, Carlos Tejedor, in Buenos Aires Province. He had been shot twice in the chest with two different pistols. Mario Firmenich took credit for the kidnapping and assassination with his partner Esther Norma Arrostito.

In the following weeks, statements from Montoneros flooded the media. Their actions were a response to the executions of twenty-seven Peronist militants who took part in an unsuccessful coup d'état in 1956 (a retaliation).

== See also ==
- History of Argentina
- List of solved missing person cases (1970s)

Political offices
Preceded by Eduardo Lonardi	President of Argentina; 1955–1958	Succeeded by Arturo Frondizi
