= Mario Firmenich =

Argentinian revolutionary and economist

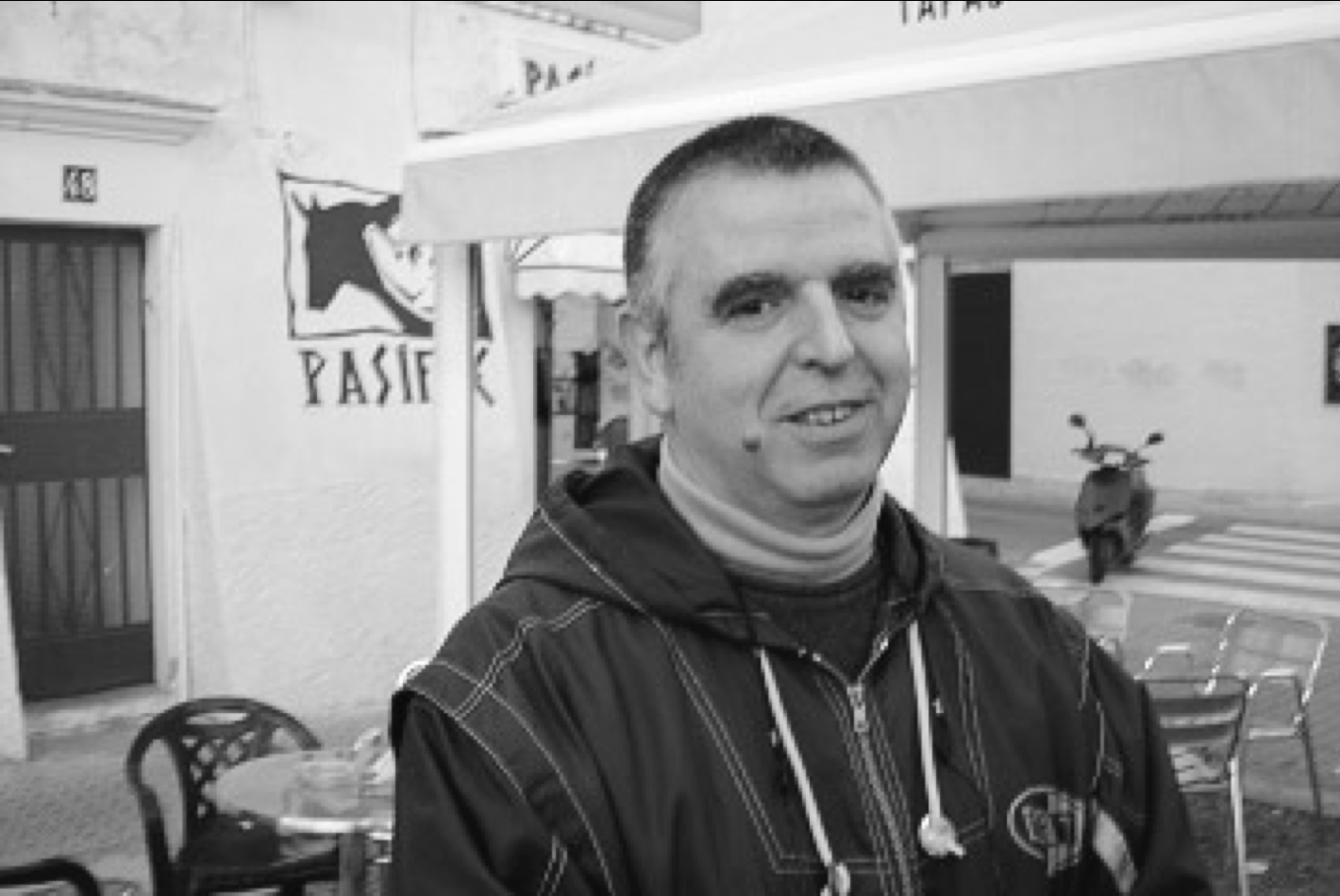
Mario Firmenich (2004)

Mario Eduardo Firmenich (born 24 January 1948) is an Argentine former urban guerrilla leader and politician. He was one of the commanders of Montoneros group and the most significant figure in the Argentine guerrillas in the 70s. In 1987, he was sentenced to life in prison for killing a businessman and attempting to murder multiple politicians in Argentina but was pardoned by president Carlos Menem in 1990.

He has been accused of many murders and kidnappings carried out by Montoneros, like the kidnapping of the Born brothers, owners of Bunge and Born, and the killing of former president Pedro Eugenio Aramburu. He confessed to the killing of Aramburu with his partner Norma Arrostito.

He was born in Buenos Aires into a family of German origins and attended the Colegio Nacional de Buenos Aires, later pursuing an agronomy degree at the University of Buenos Aires Faculty of Agronomy. He was arrested for the first time in February 1974 for his actions with Montoneros, but released soon due to legal technicalities. During the National Reorganization Process he lived in exile in different countries like Italy, Cuba, and Mexico. With the return of democracy in Argentina in 1984 under president Raúl Alfonsín, he was captured in Brazil and extradited to Argentina. After his release, he studied economy at UBA and graduated with honours, but due to his controversial figure classmates and a student political body (Franja Morada) petitioned that the honours be withdrawn.

He currently lives in Spain, where he is a professor of History and a researcher at the University of Barcelona (where he earned a degree) and at Rovira i Virgili University.
