= David Rock (historian) =

English academic (born 1945)

David Peter Rock (born 8 April 1945) is an English academic who specializes in the history of Argentina. He is a retired professor at the Department of History at the University of California, Santa Barbara, who now lives in England.

He was born in Great Harwood, Blackburn, Lancashire, England and attended Clitheroe Royal Grammar School (1956-1963). He matriculated at St John's College, Cambridge in 1964, where he graduated in 1967. He was awarded an M.A. in 1970 and a Ph.D. in 1971, both at Cambridge University. He worked as a Research Officer at the Centre of Latin American Studies, University of Cambridge in 1970-1974 and as Assistant Secretary at the Institute of Latin American Studies, University of London in London from 1974 to 1977. He moved to the U.S. to teach at the University of California, Santa Barbara, where he was promoted to Professor in 1980. He retired from university teaching 2014. He married Rosalind Farrar in 1968, with whom he had two sons.

He has been described as a "leading scholar in the field" of 19th and 20-century Argentine history. His history of the country from the sixteenth to the twentieth centuries was adjudged as "a comprehensive, clearly written and intelligent account of the evolution of Argentina which will undoubtedly remain the standard work for years to come." Rock's first book, Politics in Argentina, 1890-1930: The Rise and Fall of Radicalism won the Conference on Latin American History Bolton Prize for the best book in English. He is professor emeritus of History at the University of California, Santa Barbara.

== List of works ==
- Rock, David. The British in Argentina, Commerce, Settlers and Power, 1800–2000. London: Palgrave Macmillan, 2019
- Rock, David (2002), State Building and Political Movements in Argentina, 1860-1916, Stanford, CA: Stanford University Press.
- Rock, David, ed. (1994), Latin America in the 1940s. War and Post War Transitions, Berkeley: University of California Press.
- Rock, David (1992), Authoritarian Argentina. The Nationalist Movement: Its History and its Impact, Berkeley: University of California Press.
- Rock, David (1987), Argentina, 1516-1987. From Spanish Colonization to Alfonsín, Berkeley: University of California Press.
- Rock, David (1975), Politics in Argentina, 1890-1930. The Rise and Fall of Radicalism, Cambridge: Cambridge University Press.
