= Esther Norma Arrostito =

Argentine political far-left militant (1940–1978)

- Born: 17 January 1940; Buenos Aires, Argentina
- Died: 15 January 1978 (aged 37); Buenos Aires, Argentina
- Military career
- Allegiance: Montoneros
- Service years: 1970–1976
- Nickname: Gaby
- Conflicts: Dirty War

Esther Norma Arrostito (17 January 1940 – 15 January 1978) was an Argentine political far-left militant, initially close to communist ideology. In 1970, she became one of the founders of the Peronist revolutionary movement Montoneros along with Fernando Abal Medina, who developed a romantic relationship with her. She played a key role in the kidnapping and killing of General Pedro Eugenio Aramburu.

== Early years ==
Arrostito was born in Buenos Aires, the daughter of a middle-class couple, and grew up in a leftist background, ideologically opposed to Peronism. She graduated as an elementary school teacher and married a communist militant, Rubén Ricardo Roitvan. She later became a hard-line militant under the influence of a left-wing Peronist leader of Irish ancestry, John William Cooke. Arrostito was the only founder of the Montoneros with neither Catholic nor Nationalist affiliation.

== Militance ==
=== Killing of Aramburu ===
Norma Arrostito left the communist party in 1967, and joined the organization Comando Camilo Torres, where she met Mario Eduardo Firmenich, Carlos Ramus and Fernando Abal Medina. She fell in love with the latter, seven years her junior, and ended her relationship with Roitvan. They were trained in guerrilla warfare in Cuba during 1968, and back in Argentina they split from the Comando Camilo Torres to create a new cell. They were joined by Nélida Arrostito, a sister of Norma and her husband, Carlos Alberto Maguid. Her nom de guerre was Gaby (shortened form of the name Gabriela) or Gaviota (seagull). The organization carried out in a series of operations against the security forces, which ended on 1 June 1970 in the kidnapping and murder of General Pedro Eugenio Aramburu, a former de facto President and one of the leaders of the Revolución Libertadora which overthrew Perón in 1955. Norma played a supporting role during the kidnapping and she wrote and sent "dispatches" to the media updating the process of "trial" and "execution" of Aramburu. This operation, code named Pindapoy, marked the first public action of Montoneros. Argentina was then under military rule, but the return of Perón to power was a matter of time. The death of Aramburu prompted the fall of president Juan Carlos Onganía and triggered a huge manhunt of suspected terrorists. On 20 September, a police raid caught Ramus and Abal Medina in a restaurant in William Morris, a neighborhood in the western outskirts of Buenos Aires, killing both of them after a brief shootout. After Abal Medina's death, Arrostito was known inside the organisation as la viuda ("the widow").

=== Amnesty ===
After the military departed from power, Arrostito and her comrades of Montoneros were granted an amnesty by a decree of Héctor José Cámpora, who had won the presidential elections of March 1973. She became staff supervisor of Oscar Bidegain, Governor of Buenos Aires Province and sympathizer of Montoneros ideology. On 3 September 1973, the magazine La Causa Peronista published an interview with Arrostito and Firmenich where they described in detail the kidnapping and assassination of Aramburu.

== Clandestinity and death ==
During Perón's last term (1973–1974), the relationship between the right wing of the party and leftist organisations, including Montoneros, strained to the point of no return. In his May Day speech, Perón took sides and denounced Montoneros as imberbes ("beardless brats") and mercenaries to the service of foreign interests. The organisation was proscribed after Perón's death in July, and by September Norma and her companions were forced to live in hideouts and to meet in secret. Meanwhile, the guerrilla operations against security forces reached its climax in 1975. On 24 March 1976, a military coup overthrew president Isabel Perón. The armed forces stepped up the repression not only of leftist guerrillas, but also of their affiliates and even relatives. Arrostito was reported shot and killed after a fierce exchange of gunfire with an army patrol on 2 December 1976. The truth was that Arrostito was captured alive and illegally imprisoned at the Navy's school of mechanical engineering, the ESMA (Escuela de Mecánica de la Armada). The military faked her death in order to keep Montoneros in the belief that a lot of compromising information had been lost with her. Arrostito, however, endured more than a year of torture and humiliation without betraying her comrades. She was eventually killed by a lethal injection of pentothal on 15 January 1978, by Carlos Capdevila. Her body was never found.

== Legacy ==
- Saidon, Gabriela (2005) La montonera: Biografía de Norma Arrostito. Editorial Sudamericana. ISBN 950-07-2659-9 (in Spanish)
- The 2008 movie La Gaby directed by César D’Angiolillo is based on her biography, with Arrostito being played by Julieta Díaz. The screenwriter is Cristina Zucker, sister of disappeared Montoneros' member Ricardo Zucker and daughter of the late comedian Marcos Zucker.
