= Alberto Rocamora =

Argentine politician (1911–2004)

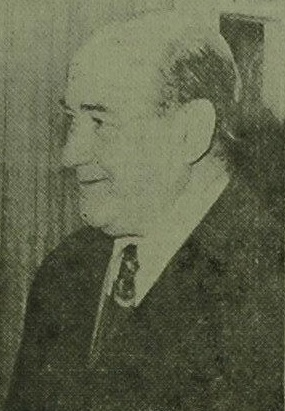
- Rocamora in 1974

Minister of the Interior
- In office 14 August 1974 – 11 July 1975
- President: Isabel Perón
- Preceded by: Benito Llambí
- Succeeded by: Antonio J. Benítez

President of the Chamber of Deputies
- In office 25 April 1955 – 16 September 1955
- Preceded by: Antonio J. Benítez
- Succeeded by: Federico Fernández de Monjardín

National Deputy
- In office 26 April 1952 – 16 September 1955
- Constituency: 13th Circunscription of Buenos Aires Province

Personal details
- Born: 5 August 1911 Ramos Mejía, Argentina
- Died: 12 July 2004 (aged 92) Buenos Aires, Argentina
- Party: Justicialist Party
- Education: University of Buenos Aires

Alberto Luis Rocamora (5 August 1911 – 12 July 2004) was an Argentine politician. A member of the Justicialist Party, he was an early supporter of President Juan Perón and his entire career unfolded as a member of the Peronist Movement.

He was elected to the Argentine Chamber of Deputies in 1951, and later served as President of the Chamber. Like all other Peronists in power, Rocamora was deposed and consequently persecuted by the military dictatorship that followed the 1955 Argentine coup d'état. Following the return of Juan Perón from exile in 1974 and the ascent to the presidency of his widow, Isabel Perón, Rocamora served as Minister of the Interior in the national cabinet until 1975.

As Interior Minister, on 5 February 1975 Rocamora was co-signant of the Decreto 261/75, which marked the beginning of the so-called Operativo Independencia, the first large-scale operation in the period of state terrorism now commonly known as the "Dirty War".

== Early life and career ==
Rocamora was born on 5 August 1911 in Ramos Mejía, Buenos Aires. He studied at the University of Buenos Aires Faculty of Law, graduating and later teaching courses there as well.

== Political career ==
A member of the Peronist Party from the moment of its foundation, he was a close collaborator of the Eva Perón Foundation. He ran for a seat in the National Chamber of Deputies in the 1951 general election; he competed for the 13th Circunscription of Buenos Aires Province and won with 74.32% of the vote for the 1952–1955 legislative term. In 1952, he was appointed by Eva Perón herself as legal representative of the Female Peronist Party.

On 25 April 1955, he was elected by his peers as President of the Chamber of Deputies, succeeding Antonio J. Benítez.

Like all other members of the National Congress, Rocamora was deposed in the 1955 coup d'état, which resulted in the exile of Juan Domingo Perón and the subsequent persecution of peronists by the military régime. In November 1972, he was part of the entourage that welcomed Perón back to Argentina, alongside other prominent members of the peronist movement such as Héctor José Cámpora, Antonio Cafiero, Raúl Lastiri, Carlos Menem, Nilda Garré, among others.

=== Minister of the Interior ===
In 1974, he briefly served from January to August as Minister of Government of Buenos Aires Province under Governor Victorio Calabró. In August, he was appointed as Minister of the Interior by President Isabel Perón. By then, Rocamora was a member of the "moderate" wing of the Peronist movement, opposed to the hardline right-wing figure of José López Rega.

In November 1974, he co-signed the federal intervention of Salta Province, then governed by Miguel Ragone, a known member of the Peronist Left who had been accused of being a "communist". On 5 February 1975 Rocamora was co-signant of the Decreto 261/75, which marked the beginning of the so-called Operativo Independencia, the first large-scale operation in the period of state terrorism now commonly known as the "Dirty War".

Rocamora also briefly served as interim Minister of Justice. In July 1975, in the midst of the economic crisis that led to the resignation of Alfredo Gómez Morales as economy minister, Rocamora resigned from his post and retired into obscurity for the remainder of Isabel Perón's government, which ended on 23 March 1976 with another coup d'état.

In 1994, he was elected to the constitutional convention in charge of writing the amendments to the national constitution, as part of the Justicialist Party. As the oldest member of the convention (aged 82), he presided the opening session before a president for the body could be elected.

== Later years and death ==
During his last years, he was a member of the Instituto del Investigaciones Históricas del Círculo de Legisladores Nacionales. As president of the institute, he had published ¿Crisis o disgregación?; hacia una nueva etapa histórica, a book recounting the 2001 crisis and summarizing his views on the short-term future of Argentina's political landscape.

Rocamora died on 12 July 2004 at Sanatorio Güemes, in Buenos Aires, and was interred at La Chacarita Cemetery. He was survived by his seven children, eleven grandchildren and three great-grandchildren, one of whom was born on the day of his death.

Political offices
Preceded by Antonio J. Benítez	President of the Chamber of Deputies; April 1955 – September 1955	Vacant 1955 coup d'état Title next held by Federico Fernández de Monjardín
Preceded by Benito Llambí	Minister of the Interior; 1974–1975	Succeeded by Antonio J. Benítez
