= David Kraiselburd =

- Born: 1912; Berisso, Argentina
- Died: July 17, 1974 (aged 61–62); Manuel B. Gonnet, Argentina
- Cause of death: Ballistic trauma
- Occupation: Journalist
- Known for: Assassination victim

David Kraiselburd (1912–1974) was an Argentine journalist, newspaper publisher, and lawyer, best known for his commitment and actions against military regimes and political violence of both right- and left-wing extraction. He was assassinated shortly after the beginning of the Dirty War—in mid-1974—and shortly before the military coup.

== Life and times ==
David Kraiselburd was born into a working-class Ukrainian Jewish family in Berisso, an industrial city north of La Plata, Argentina, in 1912. In his teens, a high-school writing contest earned him an internship in La Plata's main daily, El Día, after the end of which he was hired by the paper as a sports commentator. He enrolled in the prestigious University of La Plata, and, at the paper, he was promoted to university affairs correspondent. He was also involved in university politics—he had anarchist sympathies, and had protested Sacco and Vanzetti's execution a few years earlier. After earning the equivalent of a JD degree from Law School, he became a representative of the alumni association (Graduados). To broaden his background, he re-enrolled in the university and earned another degree in history. Also in those early years, the paper sent him to Spain to cover the Spanish Civil War.

Gradually, he rose up in the journalistic ranks and became a prominent figure within and outside the paper. El Día's financial straits eventually led the heirs of its founding partners to sell part of their stake in the daily, and, in September 1961, Kraiselburd purchased a share of El Día. The main owners of the daily became, thus, the Fascetto family (heirs of one of the founding partners) and Kraiselburd, although none had a controlling share (this partnership ended in 2010, with an agreement that gave the Fascetto family full control of Diario Popular, founded by Kraiselburd in 1974, while control of El Día was given fully to the Kraiselburd family, especially his eldest son, Raul, who took up his father's post after his murder).

== Kraiselburd and El Día in the face of the 1960s military coups and the political turmoil of the early 1970s ==
Putting his legal background in action as director and editor-in-chief, Kraiselburd was among the few Argentine publishers to openly oppose the 1966 coup d'état against the moderate, democratically elected President Arturo Illia. Kraiselburd denounced the imminent coup, and then refused to publish dictator Juan Carlos Onganía's inaugural address. Onganía's La Plata officials retaliated by confiscating that day's circulation and harassing the paper.

El Día's challenges were not mitigated by the March 1973 return to democracy. A decree signed by interim President Raúl Lastiri sought to prohibit Argentine periodicals' access to international news agencies wires, in an attempt to limit them to wires published by Telam, the state news agency founded by Lastiri's benefactor, populist former President Juan Perón. This measure amounted to a monopoly of news wires by the state agency, controlled by the government. Kraiselburd moved quickly, however, and, on his initiative, El Día and numerous other Argentine dailies established a national news agency, Noticias Argentinas. He was named president of the agency while remaining at the helm of El Día.

== Kraiselburd's murder during the 1974 "unofficial" beginning of the Dirty War ==
Staunchly centrist, El Día marshaled its "Page 4" editorial section, which had openly opposed the Ongania coup in the 60s, and that by early 1974 denounced the Argentine Anti-Communist Alliance (AAA), a right-wing paramilitary organization that was given free rein (and was supported by) the Ministry of Welfare in chasing down left-wing organizations. Naturally, the stronger left-wing organizations (i.e., the left-Peronist Montoneros) retaliated. Yet, by the same token, "El Dia" warned against the escalation of violence that was ensuing, as well as against the increasingly violent "politics" of both Left and Right. "Violence was the main medium of politics first, and became politics later," as researcher Pilar Calveiro succinctly said in regard to the process underwent by the left-wing Montoneros. Threatened by both the AAA and Montoneros, and although he was a more "fitting" target for the former, it was the latter organization the one which took action against the paper and its editor. Kraiselburd was kidnapped on June 25, 1974, by a Montoneros cell while the editor was walking toward the newspaper building.

In a spree against dissenters, and prefiguring Kraiselburd's fate, on July 15 a Montoneros unit burst into a small-town restaurant and machine-gunned a frequent El Dia contributor, former Interior (law enforcement) Minister Arturo Mor Roig, who, under the military regime of Gen. Lanusse, had been instrumental in the transition toward democracy that led to two 1973 elections, which Peron's stand-in (Hector Campora) first, and Peron later, won by a landslide. Mor Roig was a well-known moderate democrat. He had knowingly sacrificed his political career when he accepted the position offered to him by Gen. Lanusse years earlier, for the sake of speeding up the transition toward democracy. Montoneros, however, emphasized that during Mor Roig's tenure, prominent political prisoners had been massacred in the course of (and even after) a partially successful escape attempt in a Patagonian prison. The massacre had been brutal, but it was known that Mor Roig had had no involvement whatsoever. Yet, on Montoneros' view, his past association with a military government, in addition to his 1974 El Dia critical articles, made him a suitable target.

As remarked by intelligence officer, journalist, and outstanding Rodolfo Walsh—these "acts of individual terror," as Walsh called them, would not only backfire, but make popular support dwindle.

Kraiselburd would soon follow Mor Roig's fate. He was being held captive in a house in Gonnet, located between La Plata and Buenos Aires. Twenty odd days after the kidnapping, a neighbor called the police after noticing "suspicious activity" in the house next door. On July 17, 1974, a police unit was sent to investigate, and a shooting between the Montoneros cell and the police ensued. Outnumbered, the Montoneros shot Kraiselburd to death and fled the scene.

In September 1975, Kraiselburd was posthumously awarded the prestigious Maria Moors Cabot prize by Columbia University's School of Journalism, for his defense of democratic values in the face of forms of authoritarianism of both right-wing and left-wing leanings.

== Kraiselburd's imprint after 1974. Kraiselburd Jr. and El Dia during the 1976-1983 dictatorship ==
After Kraiselburd's murder, his eldest son, Raul, took up his post. Under his direction, and following the lead of his father, El Dia continued its explicit plea for the adherence to consensus-building, democratic practices, and its equally explicit rejection of lawless, criminal murders and disappearances, increasingly effected with the support of the State apparatus (1975) and, after the coup (1976) with the full disposal of the State resources at the tip of the Armed Forces. Threats from right-wing paramilitary groups, bombs in the printing press, random machine-gun attacks on buildings and houses, and other intimidatory tactics were overshadowed by the kidnapping and murder of Raul's two-year-old son, named David, after his grandfather. Chalked up to the action of "run-of-the-mill" kidnappers in search for a ransom, the case of David Kraiselburd's homonymous grandson was never fully explained—nor was the baby's body ever found.

Despite sporadic anti-Semitic aspersions claiming the contrary, El Día was, as media researcher Cesar Diaz put it in a book-length critical analysis of the printed media under the 1976-83 dictatorship, one of the few "non-partner" (no socios) newspapers, along with the better-known case of The Buenos Aires Herald and a few others; that is, newspapers that didn't partake in the "gentleman's agreement" that the military regime had imposed. The "non-partners," therefore, reported on disappearances and related crimes perpetrated by the regime. In this connection, both Robert Cox, from the Herald, and Raul Kraiselburd, from El Dia, were also awarded Columbia University's Moors Cabot Prize. Diaz's analysis of the media under the military regime, unusually virtuous in escaping the widespread polarization of accounts of the 1970s (and therefore advancing a critical stance, rather than an unqualified paean), hints that the example of the late David Kraiselburd strengthened the commitment of the journalists who risked their lives every day at the newsroom during the dark years of the juntas.

== See also ==
- List of kidnappings
- List of solved missing person cases
