= Arturo Mor Roig =

Argentine politician (1914–1974)

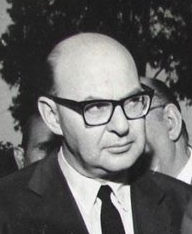

Minister of the Interior
- In office 26 March 1971 – 24 May 1973
- President: Alejandro Agustín Lanusse (de facto)
- Preceded by: Arturo Cordón Aguirre
- Succeeded by: Esteban Righi

President of the Chamber of Deputies
- In office 12 October 1963 – 28 June 1966
- Preceded by: Federico Fernández de Monjardín
- Succeeded by: Raúl Lastiri

National Deputy
- In office 12 October 1963 – 28 June 1966
- Constituency: Buenos Aires

Personal details
- Born: 14 December 1914 Lleida, Spain
- Died: 15 July 1974 (aged 59) San Justo, Argentina
- Party: Radical Civic Union
- Profession: Lawyer

Arturo Mor Roig (14 December 1914 – 15 July 1974) was an Argentine politician.

== Biography ==
Mor Roig was born in Lleida, Spain, but immigrated to Argentina with his parents and settled in San Pedro. A lawyer by profession and a member of the Radical Civic Union, he served as National Deputy for Buenos Aires Province as well as President of the Chamber of Deputies from 1963 to 1966, during the presidency of Arturo Umberto Illia.

In 1971, Mor Roig was appointed Minister of the Interior under the de facto presidency of Alejandro Agustín Lanusse. His appointment caused controversy within the Radical Civic Union, as large factions of the party were opposed to the military regime in power at the time. After Lanusse's government left office in 1973, Mor Roig retired from political life.

On 15 July 1974, Mor Roig was assassinated by a commando of the Montoneros while dining at a restaurant in San Justo. His killing, which came two weeks after the government of Isabel Perón took office, has been interpreted as a way to intimidate the new government and to make sure the Montoneros would not be left aside in future political negotiations; however, it has also been explained as an act of revenge for the 1972 Trelew massacre of 16 political prisoners, committed during Mor Roig's tenure as Minister of the Interior.

Political offices
Vacant 1962 coup d'état Title last held by Federico Fernández de Monjardín	President of the Chamber of Deputies; 1963–1966	Vacant 1966 coup d'état Title next held by Raúl Lastiri
