= Federico Fernández de Monjardín =

Argentine politician (1895–1970)

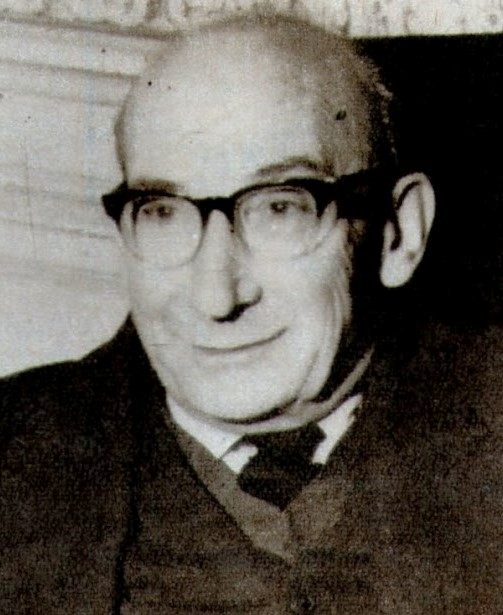
- Fernández de Monjardín in 1950

President of the Chamber of Deputies
- In office 31 March 1958 – 29 March 1962
- Preceded by: Alberto Rocamora
- Succeeded by: Arturo Mor Roig

National Deputy
- In office 31 March 1958 – 29 March 1962
- Constituency: Buenos Aires
- In office 26 April 1948 – 30 April 1952
- Constituency: Buenos Aires

Mayor of Luján
- In office 1926–1930
- Succeeded by: Enrique Urién

Personal details
- Born: 14 December 1895 Buenos Aires, Argentina
- Died: 3 April 1970 (aged 74) Luján, Argentina
- Party: Radical Civic Union (until 1957); Intransigent Radical Civic Union (1957–1970)

Federico Fernández de Monjardín (14 December 1895 – 3 April 1970) was an Argentine politician, journalist and historian. He was a member of the Radical Civic Union throughout most of his career, later joining the faction that split into the Intransigent Radical Civic Union in the aftermath of the 1955 coup d'état.

Fernández de Monjardín served as mayor of Luján Partido for two consecutive terms from 1926 to 1930. He was later elected to the Argentine Chamber of Deputies in 1948, serving until the coup d'état, and was re-elected in 1958. During his second term as deputy, he was elected by his peers as President of the Chamber.

== Early life ==
Fernández de Monjardín was born on 14 December 1895 in La Boca, Buenos Aires. His parents were Asturian wine merchants who returned to Spain when Federico was six years old. In Gijón, he graduated as a bachiller at the Instituto Jovellanos, dependent on the University of Oviedo. When he turned 18, Federico returned to Buenos Aires on his own and became employed at a store on Avenida Callao and Avenida Corrientes owned by a Spanish man.

After visiting Luján, he took a liking to the city and decided to settle there, taking employment at the El Sol store, owned by Emilio Gibaja, one of the richest men in the city.

== Political career ==
Fernández de Monjardín became a member of the Radical Civic Union (UCR) during his youth. He was elected as mayor of Luján Partido in 1926, later being re-elected for a second two-year term in 1928. As mayor, he edited the first issue of a local boletín listing all income and spending by the municipal government. Upon the end of his second term, in 1930, he was accused of embezzlement of public funds by the opposition, although the public inquiry held against him ruled him to be innocent of all charges.

In the 1948 legislative election, Fernández de Monjardín ran for a seat in the National Chamber of Deputies on the UCR list in Buenos Aires Province; he was elected with 200,882 individual votes. He did not run for re-election in the 1954 election.

After the 1955 coup d'état, which saw the overthrow of President Juan Domingo Perón, Fernández de Monjardín joined the dissident Intransigent Radical Civic Union (UCRI) which backed the presidential candidacy of Arturo Frondizi in the 1958 general election. In the same election, Fernández de Monjardín was once again elected to the Chamber of Deputies in Buenos Aires, and upon taking office he was elected by his peers as President of the Chamber.

As deputy, he sponsored laws to establish the Escuela de Comercio and to build a new headquarters for the Correo Argentino in Luján. Upon completing his term, he did not seek re-election and instead returned to Luján. The 1962 coup d'état took place four months after that.

In Luján, he is particularly remembered for his efforts to register mundane day-to-day events in the city in his Luján Retrospectivo column, published periodically in the local El Civismo newspaper starting in 1952 and until his death. His full works were compiled and re-issued in 2017.

He died on 3 April 1970 in Luján. He was survived by his two children, Raúl and Ruth, the latter of whom would go on to have a career in politics as well, serving as a National Deputy and as Secretary of Childhood Affairs during the dictatorships of Alejandro Lanusse and the National Reorganization Process.

Political offices
Preceded by	Mayor of Luján; 1926–1930	Succeeded by Enrique Urién
Vacant 1955 coup d'état Title last held by Alberto Rocamora	President of the Chamber of Deputies; 1958–1962	Vacant 1962 coup d'état Title next held by Arturo Mor Roig
