= Antonio J. Benítez =

Argentine politician (1903–1992)

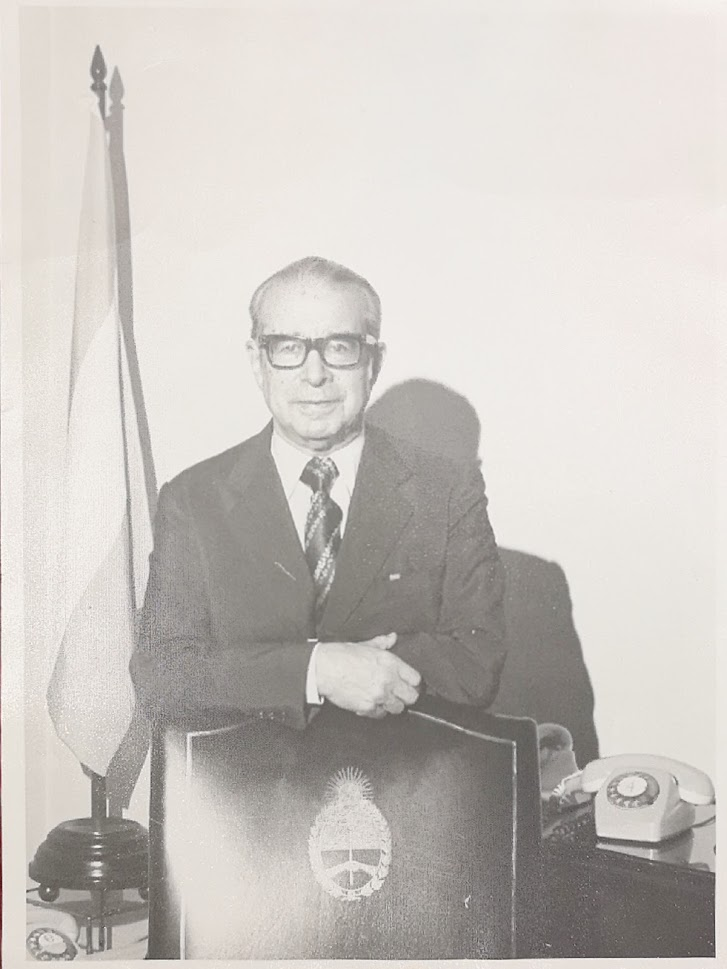
- Benítez in 1983

Minister of the Interior
- In office 11 July 1975 – 11 August 1975
- President: Isabel Perón
- Preceded by: Alberto Rocamora
- Succeeded by: Vicente Damasco

Minister of Justice
- In office 25 May 1973 – 10 June 1975
- President: See list: Héctor Cámpora Raúl Lastiri Juan Perón Isabel Perón
- Preceded by: Gervasio Colombres
- Succeeded by: Ernesto Corvalán Nanclares
- In office 26 March 1945 – 4 June 1945
- President: Edelmiro Farrell
- Preceded by: Rómulo Etcheverry Boneo
- Succeeded by: Héctor Vernengo Lima

National Deputy
- In office 26 April 1946 – 16 September 1955
- Constituency: Federal Capital (1946–1952); 15th Circunscription of the Federal Capital (1952–1955); 1st Circunscription of the Federal Capital (1955)

President of the Chamber of Deputies
- In office 25 April 1953 – 25 April 1955
- Preceded by: Héctor Cámpora
- Succeeded by: Alberto Rocamora

Personal details
- Born: 3 March 1903 Rosario, Argentina
- Died: 14 June 1992 (aged 89) Buenos Aires, Argentina
- Party: Radical Civic Union (until 1946); Justicialist Party (1946–1992)
- Education: Universidad Nacional del Litoral

Antonio Juan Benítez (3 March 1903 – 14 June 1992) was an Argentine politician. Initially a member of the Radical Civic Union, he later became a supporter of General Juan Perón, and served in several important positions during the successive Peronist governments.

A lawyer by profession, Benítez first served as Minister of Justice during the de facto administration of President Edelmiro Farrell, who rose to power after the 1943 coup d'état. Later, in 1946, Benítez was elected to the National Chamber of Deputies in the same election that brought Juan Perón to the presidency. In 1953, Benítez was elected President of the Chamber of Deputies, a position he held until 1955. Like most other high-ranking Peronists, Benítez was deposed and suffered persecution under the military government that rose to power in the 1955 coup d'état.

Benítez returned to his post as Minister of Justice in 1973, upon the election of the Peronist Héctor Cámpora as president. He would remain in the position during the successive, short-lived Peronist governments that followed, serving as minister to Raúl Lastiri, Juan Perón, and Isabel Perón. In July 1975, Isabel Perón appointed him as Minister of the Interior.

An academic and professor in the field of law (and especially aviation law), Benítez taught classes at his alma mater, the National University of the Littoral, and at the University of Buenos Aires. He also served as national commissioner of the University of Buenos Aires in 1945.

== Early life and career ==
Benítez was born in Rosario, Santa Fe, on 3 March 1903. His mother was Juana Ferrán, and his father was Cipriano A. Benítez, a Radical Civic Union politician who briefly served as mayor of Rosario from January to May 1910.

Benítez studied Judicial Sciences at the Universidad Nacional del Litoral, graduating as "Doctor in Law" in 1925, aged 22. He would later move to Buenos Aires, where he began his political involvement under the wing of UCR senator Armando Antille. Following the 1930 coup d'état, Antille and Benítez were among those who supported the deposed president Hipólito Yrigoyen, working as his defense lawyer.

== Political career ==
Benítez was first appointed to the national cabinet as Minister of Justice and Public Instruction by President Edelmiro Farrell, who had risen to power following the 1943 coup d'état.

=== First Peronist governments ===
In the 1946 general election, Benítez was the first candidate in the "Junta Renovadora UCR" list to the Argentine Chamber of Deputies in Buenos Aires. The Junta Renovadora had been formed that year as a breakaway from the UCR backing the presidential candidacy of Lieutenant General Juan Perón, who was running under the Labour Party.

With 45.61% of the vote, the Labour Party – UCR (JR) list received more than enough votes for Benítez to be elected to the Chamber of Deputies. He was re-elected in the 1951 legislative election, this time as the Peronist Party candidate in the 15th Circunscription of the Federal Capital (the electoral system of the Lower Chamber of Congress had been reformed ahead of the election). The following year, he was elected by his peers as President of the Chamber of Deputies, a position he held until 1955. He also formed part of the Constitutional Convention that wrote the Argentine Constitution of 1949 (which extended his and all other legislators' mandates from 1950 to 1952).

As congressman, in 1954 Benítez authored Ley 14.346, which increased the length of prison sentences for crimes of animal cruelty. He also sponsored a law granting equality of inheritance and rights to extramarital children, a concern for the Peronist government as First Lady Eva Perón herself was an extramarital child. In addition, Benítez sponsored the law to create the Faculty of Philosophy, Letters, and Education Sciences of the National University of Rosario.

Like the rest of Congress, Benítez was deposed from his position by the 1955 coup d'état. Due to his affiliation with the Peronist movement, Benítez suffered persecution by the new military government, and he was finally put under arrest in 1956. A 2006 report published by the Argentine Senate reported that in the early hours of 10 June 1956, Benítez and other high-ranking Peronist officials were nearly executed by a civilian military squad at Caseros Prison, but were ultimately spared.

=== Third Peronist government ===
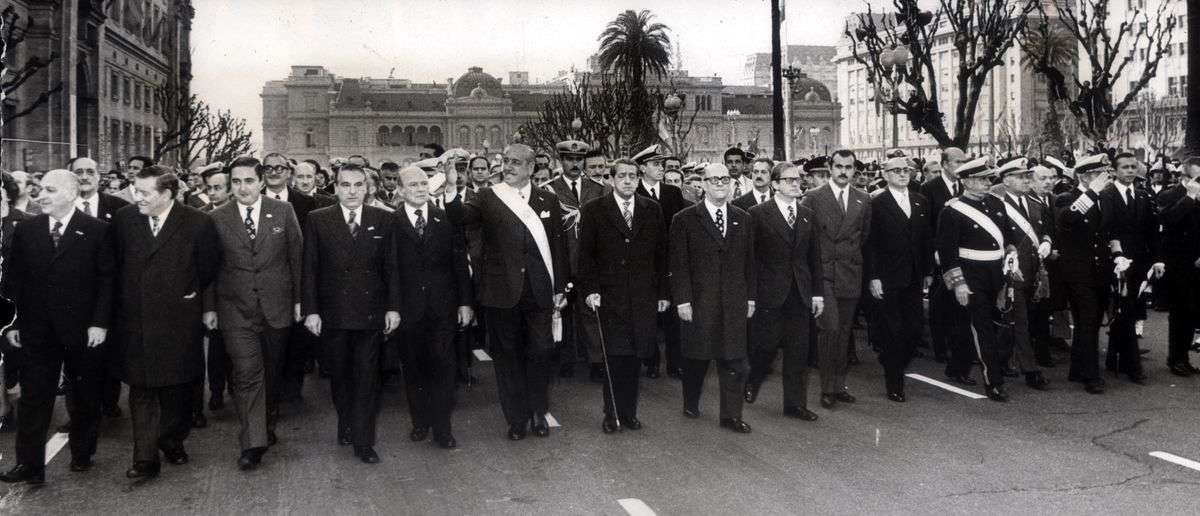
Newly elected president Héctor Cámpora and his cabinet, including Benítez (centre-right).

Following the return of democracy to Argentina and the election of Peronist Héctor Cámpora to the presidency in 1973, Benítez was once again appointed Minister of Justice in the national cabinet. Benítez remained in the position following the resignation of Cámpora mere months after being sworn in, during the interim presidency of Senate president Raúl Lastiri, and later (following his return from exile), under Juan Perón himself. Later, after Perón's death in 1974, Benítez served under his widow (and vice president-turned-president) Isabel Perón, who also had him appointed Minister of the Interior. Benítez briefly served in this position until his resignation mere weeks later on 11 August 1975.

Following the 1976 coup d'état, Isabel Perón was deposed and Peronists suffered persecution once again at the hands of the military régime. Benítez was detained and summarily condemned to prison under Acta institucional N° 2. He was imprisoned for two years at the Magdalena military prison, until he was granted house arrest due to his advanced age. He remained under house arrest well into the dictatorship, and was only released shortly before the end of the National Reorganization Process in 1983.

== Academic career ==
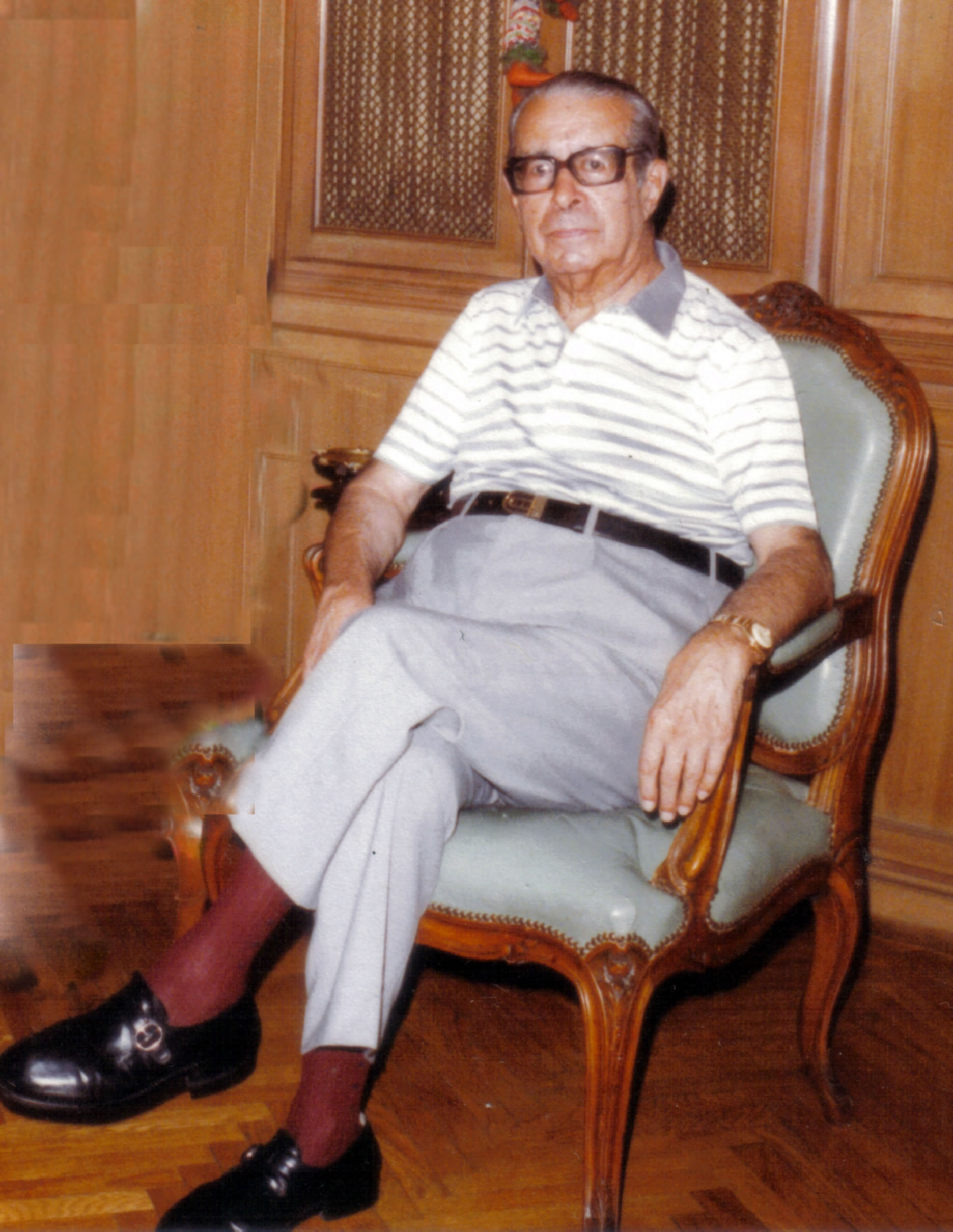
Benítez in 1989.

Benítez worked as a professor of civil law at his alma mater, the National University of the Littoral, until his designation as a maritime law professor at the University of Buenos Aires Faculty of Law. At the UBA he also created a new department for aviation law, the first in an Argentine university. In total, Benítez taught classes of maritime, aviation, and terrestrial transport law. At UBA he was also designated director of the Instituto de Derecho Comercial, and he co-authored the Código Aeronáutico de la Nación, Argentina's first aviation law code.

As Justice Minister, from 17 February to 1 March 1945 he was national commissioner of the University of Buenos Aires, intervened during the military government.

== Death ==
Benítez died on 14 June 1992 in Buenos Aires, aged 89. His funeral was held at the Salón de los Pasos Perdidos of the Congressional Palace, and he was interred on 15 June 1992 at Chacarita Cemetery.

== Honours ==
- Italy: Knight Grand Cross of the Order of Merit of the Italian Republic (16 November 1953)
- Spain: Grand Cross of the Order of Saint Raymond of Peñafort (22 May 1975)

Political offices
Preceded by Rómulo Etcheverry Boneo	Minister of Justice; March 1945 – June 1945	Succeeded by Héctor Vernengo Lima
Preceded by Héctor J. Cámpora	President of the Chamber of Deputies; 1953–1955	Succeeded by Alberto Rocamora
Preceded by Gervasio Colombres	Minister of Justice; 1973–1975	Succeeded by Ernesto Corvalán Nanclares
Preceded by Alberto Rocamora	Minister of the Interior; July 1975 – August 1975	Succeeded by Vicente Damasco
Academic offices
Preceded by Carlos Waldorp	Commissioner of the University of Buenos Aires; February 1945 – March 1945	Succeeded by Salvador Oría as Rector
