= Nicasio Sánchez Toranzo =

Argentine diplomat and politician

National Deputy
- In office 10 December 1983 – 10 December 1987
- Constituency: Tucumán
- In office 25 May 1973 – 24 March 1976
- Constituency: Tucumán

President of the Chamber of Deputies
- In office 17 July 1975 – 24 March 1976
- Preceded by: Raúl Lastiri
- Succeeded by: Juan Carlos Pugliese

Personal details
- Born: 1905 Tucumán Province
- Died: 24 April 2009 (aged 103–104)
- Party: Radical Civic Union; Justicialist Party

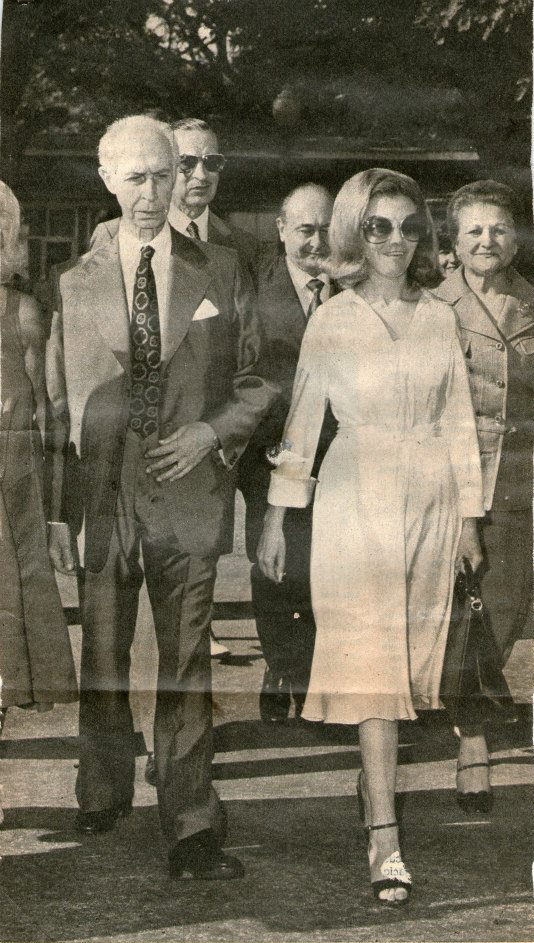
Toranzo walking with Argentinian President Isabel Perón in February 1976

Nicasio Juan Sánchez Toranzo (1905 – 24 April 2009) was an Argentine diplomat and politician of the Justicialist Party. He served as a member of the National Chamber of Deputies from 1973 to 1976 and from 1983 to 1987, and was president of the Chamber of Deputies from 1975 to 1976.

Sánchez Toranzo's political career began in his native Tucumán Province as a member of the Radical Civic Union and an agrarian leader. He would later become part of the Peronist Party, and in 1955 he was appointed chargé d'affaires of Argentina to Guatemala by President Juan Perón. As Argentina's diplomatic envoy in Guatemala during the 1954 Guatemalan coup d'état, Sánchez Toranzo gave protection to Ernesto "Che" Guevara, who was at the time staying in Guatemala City.

In 1975, following the resignation of Raúl Lastiri as president of the Chamber of Deputies, President Isabel Perón appointed Sánchez Toranzo as president of the Chamber upon recommendation of Peronist members of Congress. He would become a loyal member of Isabel Perón's reduced political circle. Alongside the rest of Congress, Sánchez Toranzo was deposed by the 1976 coup d'état.

Following the return of democracy in 1983, Sánchez Toranzo was once again elected to the Chamber of Deputies in Tucumán for the 1983–1987 term.

Political offices
| Preceded by Raúl Lastiri | President of the Chamber of Deputies; 1975–1976 | Vacant 1976 coup d'état Title next held by Juan Carlos Pugliese |
