= José López Rega =

Argentine politician (1916–1989)

José López Rega OIC
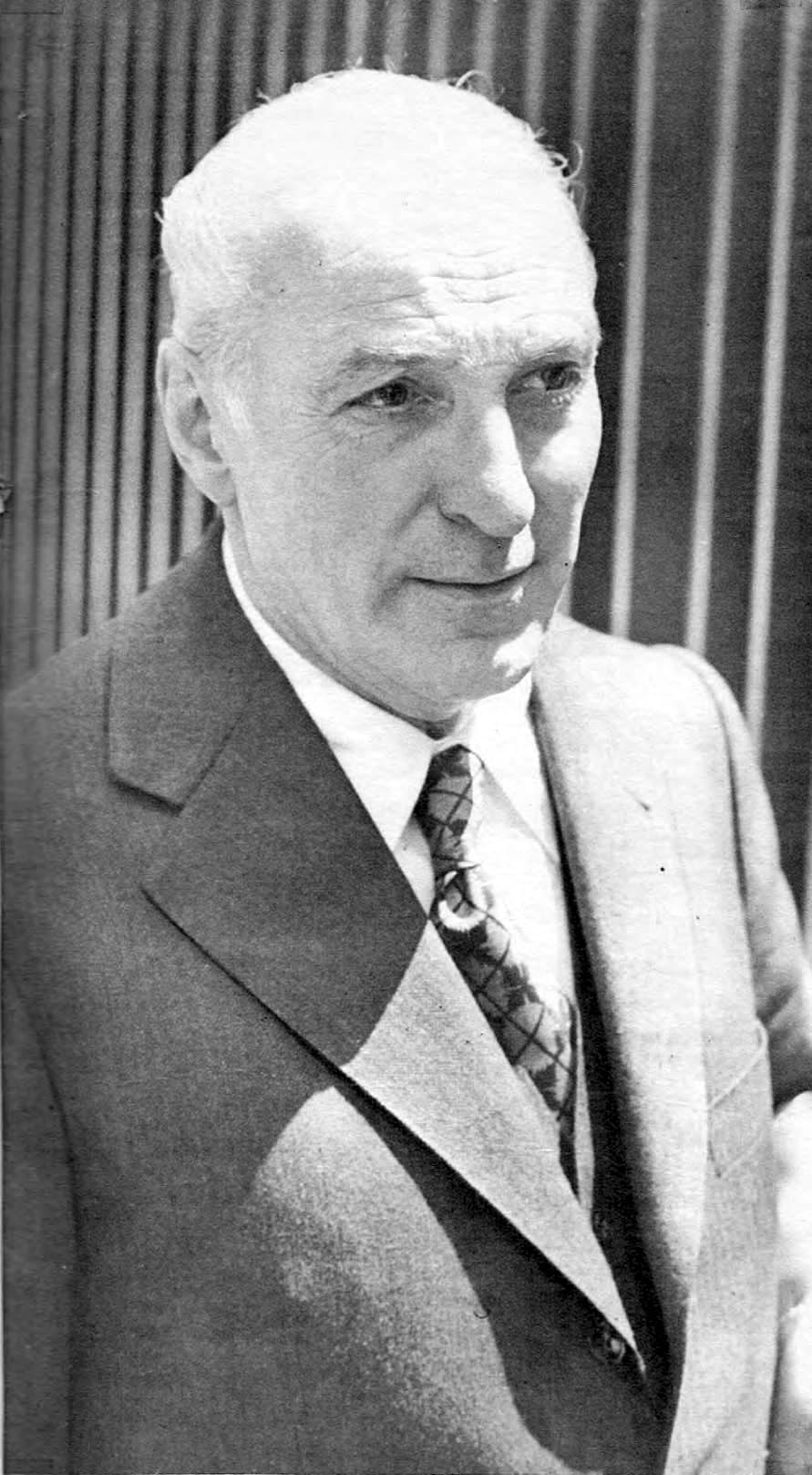
- López Rega in 1975

Argentine Ambassador to Spain
- In office 11 July 1975 – 18 June 1976
- President: Isabel Perón

Minister of the Social Security
- In office 25 May 1973 – 11 July 1975
- President: Héctor Cámpora, Raúl Lastiri, Juan Perón, Isabel Perón
- Preceded by: Oscar Puiggrós
- Succeeded by: Carlos Villone

Chief of the Triple A
- In office 13 July 1973 – 18 June 1976
- Preceded by: Title established
- Succeeded by: Title abolished

Personal details
- Born: 17 November 1916 Buenos Aires, Argentina
- Died: 9 June 1989 (aged 72) Buenos Aires, Argentina
- Party: Peronist Party
- Spouse: Josefa Flora Maseda Fontenla (m. 1943; died 1989)
- Children: 1
- Profession: Police officer, diplomat
- Nickname(s): "The Warlock", "Argentine Evola"

Military service
- Allegiance: Argentine Federal Police
- Years of service: 1945–1976
- Rank: Police commissioner Captain; Corporal

José López Rega (17 November 1916 – 9 June 1989) was an Argentine politician who served as Minister of Social Welfare from 1973 to 1975, first under Juan Perón and continuing under Isabel Perón, Juan Perón's third wife and presidential successor. Lopez Rega exercised an allegedly Rasputin-like power and influence over Isabel Perón during her presidency, and used both this and his unique access to become the de facto political boss of Argentina. His orthodox Peronist and far-right politics and interest in occultism earned him the nickname El Brujo ("the Warlock"). López Rega had one daughter, Norma Beatriz, who went on to become the spouse of President Raúl Lastiri.

== Biography ==
=== Early life ===
López Rega's mother died giving birth to him in Buenos Aires. According to his biography by Marcelo Larraquy (2002), he was a respectful, introverted boy, who had a library covering an entire wall and a special interest in spiritual topics (which would later turn into a passion for esotericism and occultism). He married at the age of 27. In 1944 he joined the Federal Police; with the help of police chief Filomeno Velazco, he joined the guard which protected the Casa Rosada, seat of the executive, with the rank of corporal.

In 1951, he met Victoria Montero who introduced him in the subject of esotericism. López Rega was a frequent visitor in Montero's home, where he met members of the freemasons organization. A common interest in esotericism linked him to Isabel, Perón's third wife, in 1965. (Evidently, Rega's esotericism included the writings of Alice Bailey: "Also found in his [Rega's] home were 12 volumes by Alice Bailey on telepathy and Cosmic Fire...") Sent to Argentina by Perón, exiled in Spain since the 1955 "Revolución Libertadora" coup, she organized a meeting in the house of major Bernardo Alberte, Perón's delegate and sponsor of various left-wing Peronist movements, among which the CGT de los Argentinos, a labour union federation which, between 1968 and 1972, gathered opponents to a pact with Juan Carlos Onganía's dictatorship, and which had an important role in the 1969 Cordobazo insurrection. After winning Isabel's trust, López Rega travelled to Spain, where he worked first for Perón's security before becoming the couple's personal secretary.

=== Allegiance with Perón ===
When Héctor José Cámpora was elected president on 11 March 1973, for the first general elections since 1963, as Perón's stand-in since the latter was forbidden from running himself, José López Rega, sent by Perón, became Minister of Social Welfare. From there, he opposed himself to Esteban Righi and other representatives of the Peronist left-wing. Perón returned to Argentina on 20 June 1973, acclaimed by the masses.

The Ezeiza massacre, organized by López Rega on the day of Perón's return from an 18-year exile, led to a definitive split between left and right-wing Peronism, with Cámpora as representative of the left-wing and López Rega as representative of the right-wing. López Rega had positioned snipers under Perón's stage, who opened fire on members of left-wing Peronist organizations, such as the Montoneros. On the following day, Mario Roberto Santucho, leader of the Guevarist Ejército Revolucionario del Pueblo (ERP), held a press conference during which he accused López Rega and Colonel José Manuel Osindi of the massacre.

Perón and López Rega, who had formerly supported left-wing Peronists while in Spain, strongly criticized them this time around. López Rega openly criticized president Cámpora's position during the cabinet meeting. After discovering that Perón had met with José Ignacio Rucci and other right-wing CGT leaders, as well as the Army, Cámpora and his vice-president Vicente Solano Lima resigned. All of Cámpora's followers were sacked from government positions. López Rega's son-in-law, Raúl Alberto Lastiri, also a member of P2, became interim president and organized the elections.

López Rega's success in the expulsion of the left-wing Peronists from power was confirmed on 4 August 1973, during the National Congress of Perón's Justicialist Party, with the nomination of his protector Isabel as a candidate for the vice-presidency. On 23 September, the Perón-Perón ticket won comfortably, with 61.85% of the votes. Troubled by the right-wing shift of Peronism and of the government, the Montoneros, a left-wing Peronist group, assassinated CGT leader José Ignacio Rucci on 25 September 1973. The latter had also been involved in the creation of the Triple A (Alianza Argentina Anticomunista — Argentine Anticommunist Alliance). This assassination gave a pretext to López Rega to decree the prohibition of all armed groups and the closure of El Mundo, a left-wing newspaper. On 21 November 1973, radical senator Hipólito Solari Yrigoyen was seriously injured in the first terrorist attack claimed by the Triple A. Federal Police Chief Rodolfo Almirón had been suspected of organizing this attack.

=== Role in the government ===
Among Juan Perón's first actions after taking office were tougher sentences against "sedition" and "subversion". Started after the Ezeiza massacre, the split with the Peronist left-wing became even more visible with the resignation of eight representatives belonging to the Juventud Peronista (Peronist Youth). When Perón died on 1 July 1974, Isabel assumed power and López Rega became a sort of Prime minister, assuming the direction of all ministries in the Presidency's orbit. He decided almost by himself on the composition of the new cabinet, keeping for himself the title of Minister of Social Welfare. He was promoted to Comisario General, the highest rank in the Federal Police; he had reached the rank of corporal when a member of the police force.

As Isabel Perón's Minister of Social Welfare, López Rega conducted an unpopular policy of fiscal conservatism. In 1975 his protégé Celestino Rodrigo, Minister of Economy, devalued the Argentine peso by 50%, causing massive economic havoc, inflation, loss of savings, and general hardship on the middle and lower classes (in particular, public employees and retirees). López Rega came under attack from the leftist factions of the Peronist Party, accused of being a counter-revolutionary and a fascist.

In July 1975 he was formally accused by the main party organ of instigating the action of the Argentine Anti-Communist Alliance (Triple A). A terrorist group organized with his other protégé Rodolfo Almirón and funded by the Ministry of Social Welfare, this death squad was responsible for the death of 1,500 people and the exile of hundreds more. Starting with the 20 June 1973 Ezeiza massacre, it initiated the "Dirty War" in Argentina which was later taken over by Jorge Videla's military junta (1976–83) during which around 30,000 people were "disappeared" (the Argentinian army acknowledged 22,000 disappearances between 1975 and 1979 8000 more in 5 years are a conservative guess). López Rega was a member of Licio Gelli's Propaganda Due, who often visited him as a friend.

=== Fall and final years ===
Under heavy criticism due to Celestino Rodrigo's economic policies, López Rega was forced to resign on 11 July 1975; he was hurriedly appointed ambassador to Spain by Isabel Perón and fled to Franco's Spain with Rodolfo Almirón; Almirón later became the chief of security of Manuel Fraga, leader of the People's Alliance post-Franco conservative party, but was arrested in Spain in December 2006.

On 24 March 1976, President Isabel Perón was deposed by the military Junta, which in turn organized the so-called "National Reorganization Process" and generalized the "Dirty War". López Rega spent the following ten years fleeing prosecution abroad, leaving Spain for Switzerland, where he lived near Geneva until 1982. Discovered by a photographer, he then fled to the Bahamas. He lived between Miami and the Bahamas until 1986, when he was arrested in the United States while trying to renew his passport, and extradited to Argentina, where he was wanted for corruption, conspiracy, and multiple homicides. He died of diabetes on 9 June 1989 in Buenos Aires, while awaiting trial in prison.

== In film ==
In the 2013 film Puerta de Hierro, el exilio de Perón, Fito Yanelli plays López Rega during Perón's exile in Madrid. López Rega is dismissed by Perón but allowed back because of his wife's intercession.

== Sources ==
- Biography of José López Rega (in Spanish)
- López Rega. La biografía. Marcelo Larraquy. Editorial Sudamericana. 473 pages. ISBN 950-07-2441-3.
- Bra, Gerardo, "La 'P-2- en la Argentina", in Félix Luna (ed) et al., Todo es historia, No. 214, Feb 1985, pp. 12–15
