= Vicente Solano Lima =

Vice President of Argentina

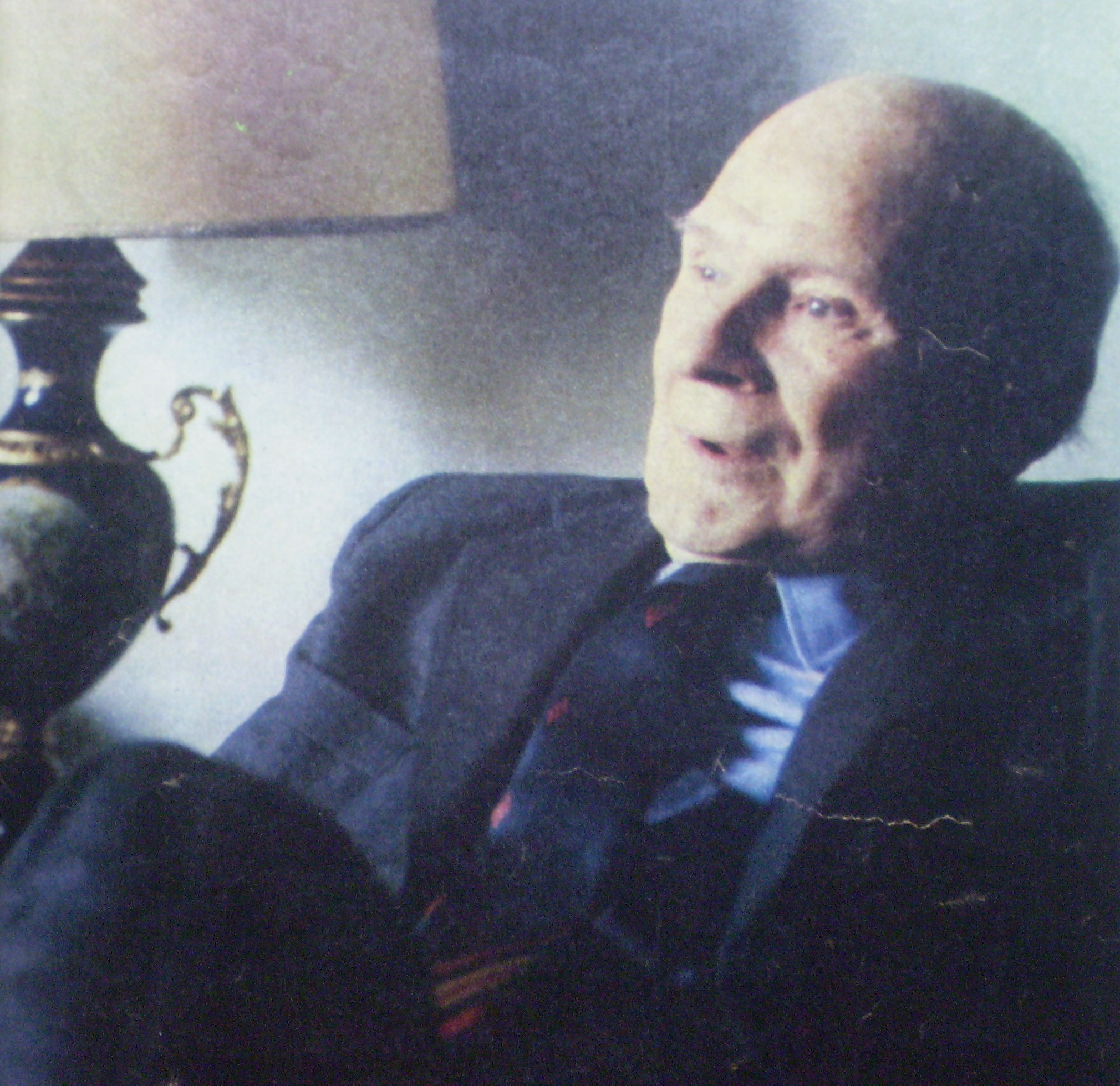

27th Vice President of Argentina
- In office May 25, 1973 – July 13, 1973
- President: Héctor Cámpora
- Preceded by: Carlos H. Perette
- Succeeded by: Isabel Perón

Personal details
- Born: September 21, 1901 Ramallo; Buenos Aires Province
- Died: April 23, 1984 (aged 82) Buenos Aires
- Party: Conservative People's Party
- Profession: Lawyer

Vicente Solano Lima (September 21, 1901 – April 23, 1984) was a moderately conservative newspaper publisher and politician who served as Vice President of Argentina from May 25, 1973, to July 13, 1973.

== Life and times ==
Born in Ramallo, Buenos Aires, Solano Lima joined the Conservative People's Party while enrolled in the University of La Plata. He earned a law degree in 1921 and became a provincial legislator in 1925, serving in the Lower House of the Argentine Congress on two occasions as a center-right National Democratic Party member. Solano Lima purchased an ailing San Nicolás de los Arroyos newspaper, El Norte, in 1928. Becoming a market leader in northeastern Buenos Aires Province (an area which also includes Ramallo), El Norte became a forum for the National Democrats, who enjoyed majorities in Congress during most of the 1930s.

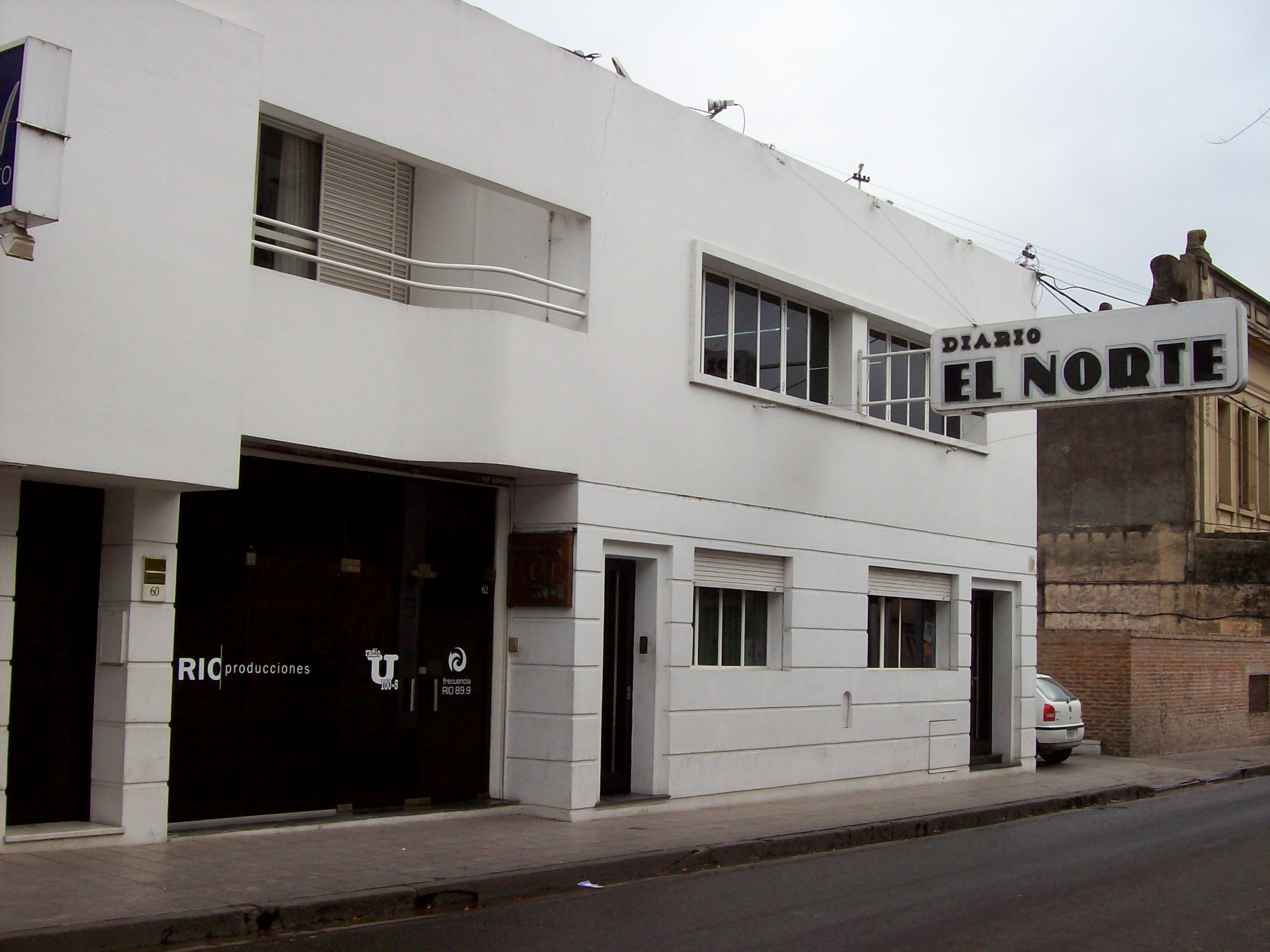
Solano Lima's influential El Norte, San Nicolás de los Arroyos.

The election of laborist leader Juan Perón to the Presidency in 1946 resulted in the daily's closure in 1948. Following Perón's 1955 overthrow, however, the National Democrats' staunchly anti-Peronist stance led Solano Lima to join Senator Alberto Fonrouge in his break from the party, co-founding the Conservative People's Party in 1958. Supporting a policy of rapprochement with the exiled Perón, the Popular Conservatives joined the banned Peronists in a joint Popular Front for the 1963 elections, for which he accepted the nomination for the Presidency; the military's insistence on their ban thwarted the move, however, and helped lead to record blank votes.

The ban on Peronism was rescinded ahead by President Alejandro Lanusse ahead of his call for new elections in 1973, and the Popular Conservatives endorsed Perón's stand-in, Héctor Cámpora. Despite his conservative affiliation, Solano Lima was nominated as the leftist Cámpora's running mate, and the ticket sailed to victory on March 11. Taking office on May 25, Solano Lima focused his attention on helping increase university enrollment among the working and lower classes in Argentina. He joined President Cámpora in Juan Perón's retinue on the leader's June 20 return from exile in Madrid; facing sudden rioting near the international airport on their descent, further tragedy was averted by the Vice President's insistence that the flight be diverted to the Morón Airport and Air Base. The confrontation and differences between Cámpora and Perón's leading right-wing advisor, José López Rega, caused Solano Lima to resign as Vice President on July 13, leading Cámpora to do likewise.

Suffering from worsening asthma, Solano Lima considered retirement in Spain, but was persuaded by Perón to stay on as Chief of Staff when the latter was elected President on snap elections in September. Perón appointed him Rector of the University of Buenos Aires in March 1974, though the president's death that July led to Solano Lima's retirement from public life, days later. Returning to San Nicolás, he joined a number of friends in a law practice, and granted numerous interviews in subsequent years; he died in Buenos Aires in 1984, at age 82.

Political offices
Preceded by Carlos H. Perette	Vice President of Argentina; 1973	Succeeded by Isabel Perón
