= Elena Holmberg =

Argentine diplomat

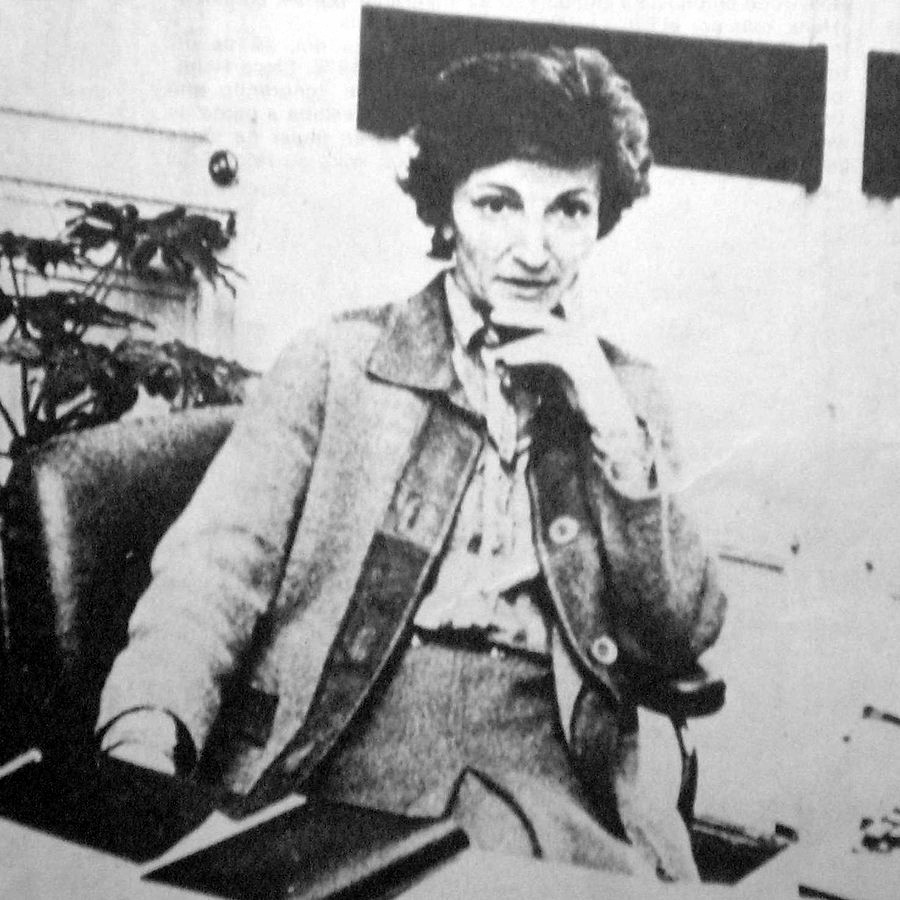
- Born: Elena Angélica Dolores Holmberg Lanusse; 24 May 1931; Buenos Aires, Argentina
- Disappeared: 20 December 1978 (aged 47); Buenos Aires, Argentina
- Occupation: Diplomat

Elena Angélica Dolores Holmberg Lanusse (24 May 1931 – disappeared 20 December 1978), better known as Elena Holmberg, was an Argentine diplomat who was kidnapped and assassinated in 1978. Distinguished for being the first woman to graduate from the Institute of Foreign Services of the Nation, Holmberg was an important official of the military dictatorship which took power in 1976, and is generally believed to have been detained-disappeared and then killed by the regime to which she belonged.

== Biography ==
Elena Holmberg came from a traditional family, the sister of retired Colonel Enrique Holmberg and cousin of General Alejandro Lanusse (former president of Argentina). She worked as a career functionary at the Argentine Embassy in France.

Due to friction with the staff of the "Pilot Information Center" (a group of Argentine Navy intelligence officers headquartered in Paris, where Puma Perrén, Alfredo Astiz, and Adolfo Donda were also assigned), the diplomat was summoned to Buenos Aires to report to her superiors. There she was kidnapped by Task Group 3.3.2 on 20 December 1978 when she left the Ministry of Foreign Affairs to meet a group of French journalists.

People released from the Higher School of Mechanics of the Navy (ESMA) declared that at that time certain officers of the detention center alluded to their participation in the disappearance of Elena Holmberg.

On 11 January 1979, her decomposed body was found in the Luján River in Tigre, Buenos Aires Province. It was later identified by her cousin Lanusse.

Holmberg's family and journalist Andrea Basconi have asserted they believe that Admiral Emilio Massera was the one who directly ordered her death, believing that she possessed compromising information about his contact with members of the Montoneros.

== See also ==
- List of kidnappings
- List of solved missing person cases
