= President of Argentine Chamber of Deputies =

President of the Argentine Chamber of Deputies
- Presidente de la Honorable Cámara de Diputados de la Nación Argentina
- Logo of the Chamber of Deputies

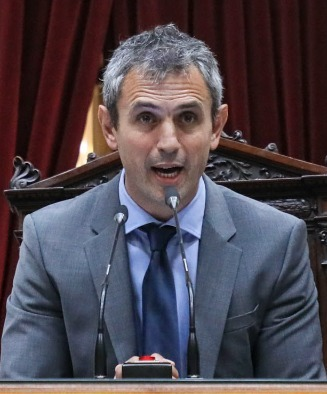
- Incumbent; Martín Menem since 10 December 2023
- Term length: One year, renewable
- Inaugural holder: José Graña
- Formation: Argentine Constitution of 1853
- Deputy: Cecilia Moreau, First Vice President
- Website: Honorable Cámara de Diputados de la Nación

The president of the Honourable Chamber of Deputies of the Argentine Nation (Spanish: Presidente de la Honorable Cámara de Diputados de la Nación Argentina), commonly known simply as the president of the Chamber of Deputies, is the presiding officer of the lower house of the National Congress of Argentina, customarily a member of the governing party.

The president is an elected member of the Chamber who is chosen by his or her fellow deputies at the outset of each legislative year, which per governing statutes established in 1996, takes place during the first ten days of December. Three vice presidents deputise the president, and they are typically elected from minority blocs in the Chamber.

In the country's order of succession, the president of the Chamber of Deputies is third in line should the president of Argentina die, resign, or be otherwise incapacitated, after the vice president and the provisional president of the Senate. In all of Argentina's history, only two presidents of the Chamber have ever assumed executive powers in interim fashion: Raúl Lastiri in 1973, and Eduardo Camaño in 2001.

== List of presidents ==
President	Party	Term start	Term end
José Graña	Unitarian Party	17 October 1854	10 May 1856
Baltazar Sánchez	Unitarian Party	10 May 1856	9 May 1857
Juan José Álvarez	Unitarian Party	9 May 1857	7 May 1858
Mateo Luque	Federalist Party	7 May 1858	5 May 1860
Eusebio Ocampo	Federalist Party	5 May 1860	4 April 1861
José García Isasa	Federalist Party	4 April 1861	24 May 1862
Pastor Obligado	Autonomist Party	24 May 1862	27 April 1863
José Evaristo Uriburu	Autonomist Party	27 April 1863	4 May 1864
Arístides Villanueva	Autonomist Party	4 May 1864	30 April 1865
José Evaristo Uriburu	Autonomist Party	30 April 1865	15 May 1868
Mariano Acosta	Autonomist Party	15 May 1868	4 May 1869
Manuel Quintana	Autonomist Party	4 May 1869	5 May 1870
Mariano Acosta	Autonomist Party	5 May 1870	29 April 1872
Octavio Garrigós	Autonomist Party	29 April 1872	4 May 1874
Luis Sáenz Peña	National Autonomist Party	4 May 1874	5 May 1875
Bernardo de Irigoyen	National Autonomist Party	4 May 1875	5 May 1876
Félix Frías	National Autonomist Party	4 May 1876	1 May 1879
Manuel Quintana	National Autonomist Party	1 May 1879	3 May 1881
Vicente Peralta	National Autonomist Party	3 May 1881	28 April 1882
Tristán Achával	National Autonomist Party	28 April 1882	30 April 1883
Miguel Navarro	National Autonomist Party	30 April 1883	29 April 1884
Rafael Ruiz	National Autonomist Party	29 April 1884	26 April 1886
Juan Serú	National Autonomist Party	26 April 1886	4 May 1887
Estanislao Zeballos	National Autonomist Party	4 May 1887	1 May 1888
Carlos Tagle	National Autonomist Party	1 May 1888	4 May 1889
Tristán Malbrán	National Autonomist Party	4 May 1889	28 April 1890
Benjamín Zorrilla	National Autonomist Party	28 April 1890	1 May 1893
Francisco García	National Autonomist Party	1 May 1893	26 April 1894
Francisco Alcobendas	National Autonomist Party	26 April 1894	27 April 1896
Marco Aurelio Avellaneda	National Autonomist Party	27 April 1896	15 June 1901
Benito Villanueva	National Autonomist Party	15 June 1901	26 April 1904
Benjamín Victorica	National Autonomist Party	26 April 1904	28 April 1905
Ángel Sastre	National Autonomist Party	28 April 1905	26 April 1906
Alejandro Carbó	National Autonomist Party	26 April 1906	29 April 1907
Juan Manuel Ortiz de Rosas	National Autonomist Party	29 April 1907	1 May 1908
Eliseo Cantón	National Autonomist Party	1 May 1908	13 May 1912
Rosendo Fraga	National Autonomist Party	13 May 1912	25 April 1914
Marco Aurelio Avellaneda	National Autonomist Party	25 April 1914	1 May 1915
Alejandro Carbó	National Autonomist Party	1 May 1915	12 January 1916
Mariano Demaría	National Autonomist Party	12 January 1916	10 April 1918
Fernando Saguier	Radical Civic Union	10 April 1918	8 January 1919
Arturo Goyeneche	Radical Civic Union	8 January 1919	26 April 1922
Ricardo Pereyra	Radical Civic Union	26 April 1922	10 April 1924
Mario Guido	Radical Civic Union	10 April 1924	6 April 1926
Miguel Sussini	Antipersonalist UCR	6 April 1926	21 May 1928
Andrés Ferreyra	Radical Civic Union	21 May 1928	6 September 1930
Congress closed during the dictatorship of José Félix Uriburu (1930–1932)
Juan Cafferata	National Democratic Party	20 January 1932	10 April 1934
Manuel Fresco	National Democratic Party	10 April 1934	25 April 1936
Carlos Noel	Radical Civic Union	25 April 1936	26 April 1938
Juan Gaudencio Kaiser	National Democratic Party	26 April 1938	26 April 1940
Carlos Noel	Radical Civic Union	26 April 1940	3 January 1941
José Luis Cantilo	Radical Civic Union	3 January 1941	5 June 1943
Congress closed during the dictatorship of the Revolución del 43 (1943–1946)
Ricardo Guardo	Peronist Party	26 April 1946	26 April 1948
Héctor Cámpora	Peronist Party	26 April 1948	25 April 1953
Antonio J. Benítez	Peronist Party	23 April 1953	27 July 1955
Alberto Rocamora	Peronist Party	27 July 1955	23 September 1955
Congress closed during the dictatorship of the Revolución Libertadora (1955–1958)
Federico Fernández de Monjardín	Intransigent UCR	31 March 1958	29 March 1962
Arturo Mor Roig	Radical Civic Union	12 August 1963	28 June 1966
Congress closed during the dictatorship of the Revolución Argentina (1966–1973)
Raúl Lastiri	Justicialist Party	7 May 1973	7 July 1975
Nicasio Sánchez Toranzo	Justicialist Party	7 July 1975	24 March 1976
Congress closed during the dictatorship of the National Reorganization Process (1976–1983)
Juan Carlos Pugliese	Radical Civic Union	29 November 1983	3 April 1989
Leopoldo Moreau	Radical Civic Union	26 April 1989	6 July 1989
Alberto Pierri	Justicialist Party	6 July 1989	1 December 1999
Rafael Pascual	Radical Civic Union	1 December 1999	5 December 2001
Eduardo Camaño	Justicialist Party	5 December 2001	6 December 2005
Alberto Balestrini	Justicialist Party–FPV	6 December 2005	12 December 2007
Eduardo Fellner	Justicialist Party–FPV	12 December 2007	6 December 2011
Julián Domínguez	Justicialist Party–FPV	6 December 2011	4 December 2015
Emilio Monzó	PRO–Cambiemos	4 December 2015	10 December 2019
Sergio Massa	Renewal Front–FdT	10 December 2019	3 August 2022
Cecilia Moreau	Renewal Front–FdT	3 August 2022	10 December 2023
Martín Menem	UCEDE–LLA	10 December 2023	incumbent
