= El Día (La Plata) =

Argentine daily newspaper

- Type: Daily newspaper
- Owner(s): El Día S.A.I.C. y F.
- Publisher: Raúl Kraiselburd
- Founded: 1884
- Political alignment: centre-right
- Headquarters: La Plata, Argentina
- Website: eldia.com

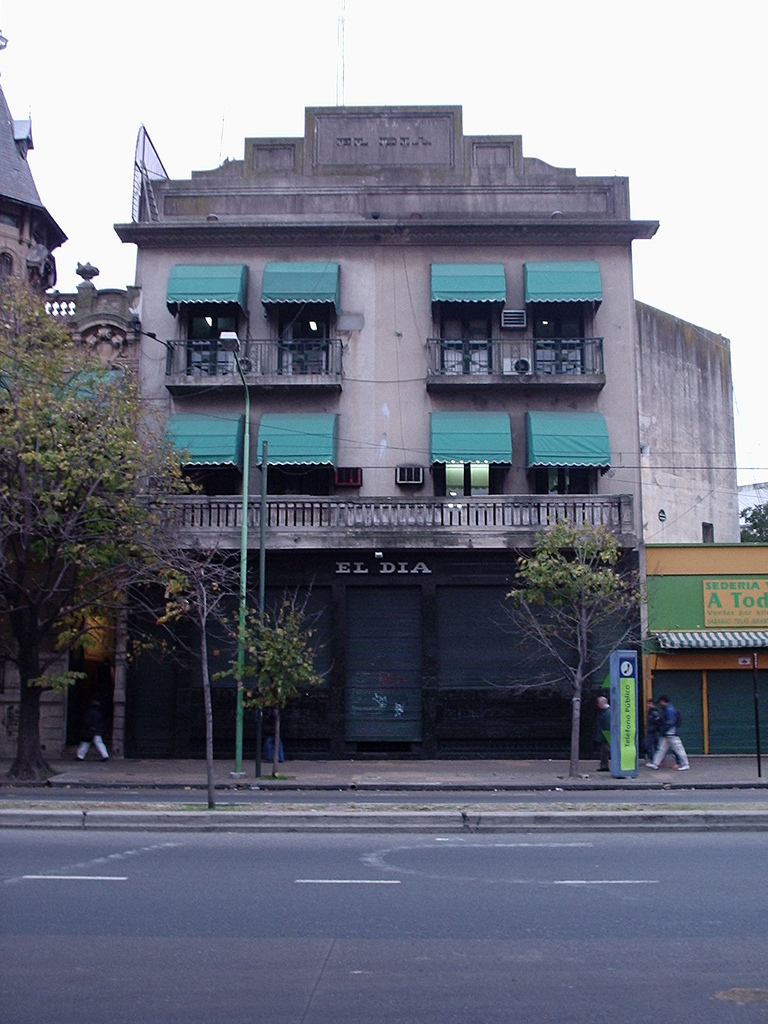
Editorial bureau in La Plata

El Día is an Argentine daily newspaper published in the city of La Plata.

== History ==
A year following the establishment of the city of La Plata as the capital of the Province of Buenos Aires, four local intellectuals, Manuel Lainez, Arturo Ugalde, Martín Biedma and Julio Botet formed a partnership with the purpose of giving the new town (the first planned city in Argentina and South America) a daily newspaper. The hamlet depended on Buenos Aires media and counted with only one local periodical: La Propaganda (a listing of classified ads). Their preparation led to the 2 March 1884, launch of El Día, whose first issue boasted 4 pages and cost 5 cents; 900 copies were circulated that day.

Published in a small building near the former freight railway depot, the owners of the struggling daily persuaded a distinguished retired journalist, José María Mendía, to serve as its first director.

Soon earning renown for its timely coverage and for its outspoken editorials section on page 4, El Día was directed for most of the era between 1894 and 1952 by Hugo Stunz, who fended off periodic competition from the numerous upstart dailies which enjoyed a passing history in La Plata during the 20th century. The growing daily drew much of its new staff from the prestigious local University of La Plata and its related high-school, the Colegio Nacional. From the latter, El Dia hired David Kraiselburd, who would become a prominent local lawyer, head of the university alumni federation, and journalist.

By 1961, Kraiselburd had become editor-in-chief, and, along with the Fascetto family (heirs of Stunz's daughter), bought an important share of El Dia. Inheriting a financially strapped company, Kraiselburd's staunch opposition to the era's military coups, and innovations such as special sections, helped recover El Día, whose circulation soon averaged over 70,000.

Kraiselburd was murdered by the far-left Montoneros in 1974, and El Día has since been directed by the owner's son, Raúl Kraiselburd, who was also recognized as an advocate of free press. According to Columbia University's School of Journalism, which awarded both father and son the prestigious Moors Cabot Prize (in 1975, posthumously, to the former; in 2003 to the latter), the Kraiselburds maintained the independence of El Dia, which reported on disappearances and other issues that were covered up by most of the Argentine media during the Dirty War (1976–1983).

The 1980s and 1990s brought different challenges – the launching of other local newspapers, the worldwide spread of the internet, which had a detrimental effect on print papers – and El Dia therefore strengthened its local sections (sports, but also, remarkably, an important section that took the role of "ombudsman" of the county, where citizens could send their complaints) as well as its coverage of international news.

In the 2000s, El Dia strengthened its interactive relation with its readers via more online resources (there is a section called "Send Your Own News") and an online form to present complaints and comments to the "Advocate of the Neighbors" (Defensor de los Vecinos).
