= Héctor José Cámpora =

President of Argentina from May to July 1973

Héctor Cámpora
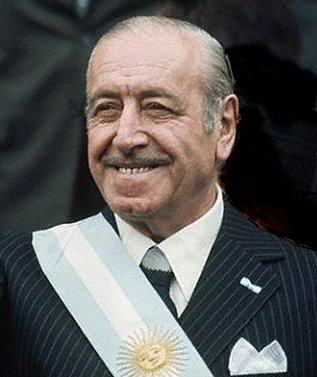
- Campora in 1973

38th President of Argentina
- In office 25 May 1973 – 13 July 1973
- Vice President: Vicente Solano Lima
- Preceded by: Alejandro Agustín Lanusse (de facto)
- Succeeded by: Raúl Alberto Lastiri (interim)

President of the Chamber of Deputies
- In office 26 April 1948 – 26 April 1953
- Preceded by: Ricardo Guardo
- Succeeded by: Antonio J. Benítez

National Deputy
- In office 4 June 1946 – 16 September 1955
- Constituency: Buenos Aires (1946–1952); Buenos Aires's 24th circonscription (1952–1955)

Personal details
- Born: Héctor José Cámpora; 26 March 1909 Mercedes, Argentina
- Died: 18 December 1980 (aged 71) Cuernavaca, Mexico
- Party: Justicialist
- Spouse: María Georgina Cecilia Acevedo
- Profession: Dentist
- Héctor José Cámpora's voice Recorded c.1973

Héctor José Cámpora (26 March 1909 – 18 December 1980) was an Argentine politician. A major figure of left-wing Peronism, Cámpora was briefly Argentine president from 25 May to 13 July 1973 and subsequently arranged for Juan Perón to run for president in an election that he subsequently won. The modern left-wing Peronist political youth organization La Cámpora is named after him.

Cámpora, affectionately known as el Tío (the Uncle), was born as Héctor José Cámpora Demaestre on 26 March 1909, in the city of Mercedes, in the Province of Buenos Aires. He earned a degree in dentistry in Córdoba University and practiced his profession in his hometown before moving to nearby San Andrés de Giles.

== From 1945 to 1970 ==
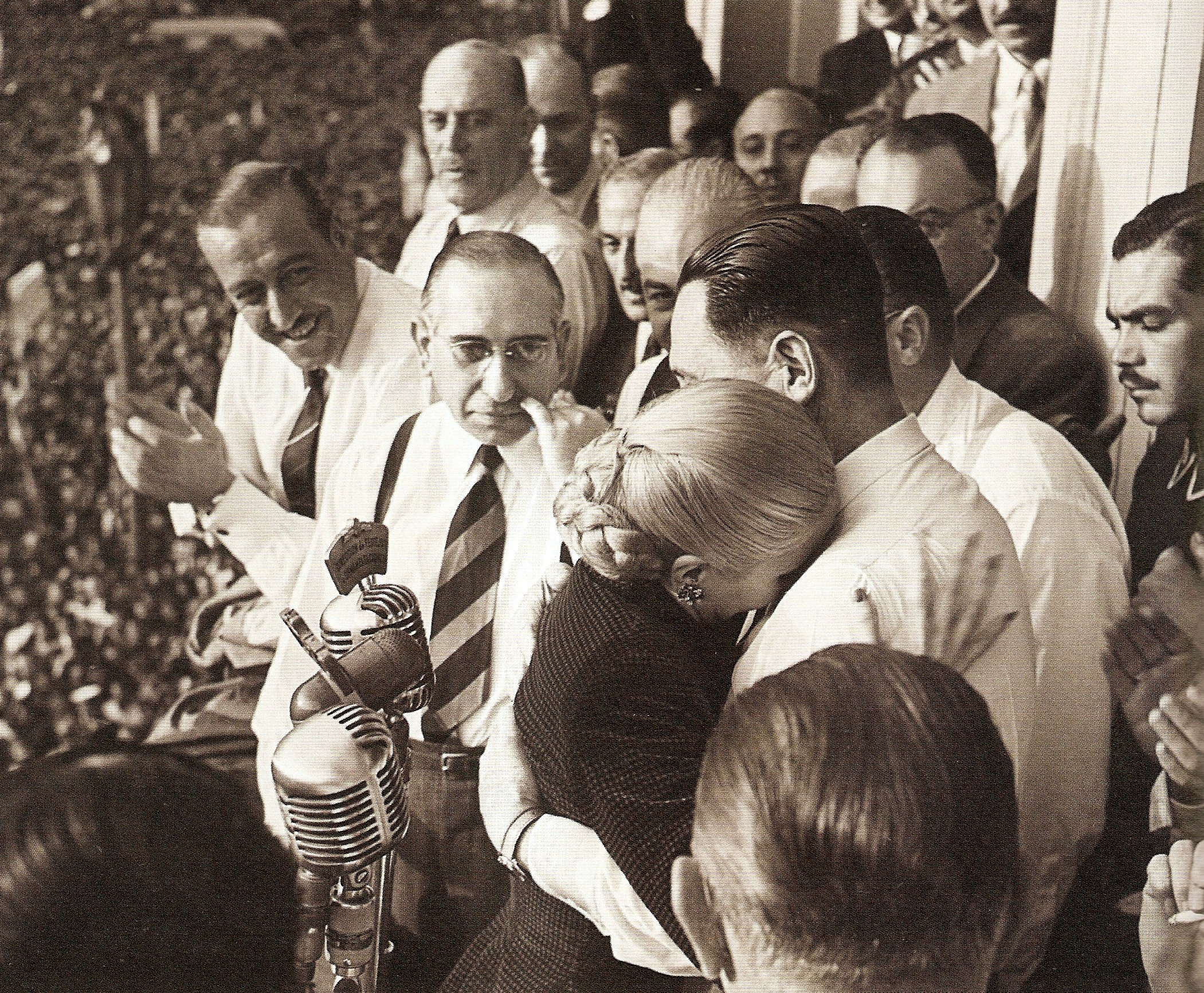
Cámpora was alongside Evita during the 1951 joint ticket rally, unable to accept popular calls that she run for Vice-President.

Cámpora knew General Juan Perón when the latter visited San Andrés de Giles as minister of labour in 1944. After Perón was elected president in 1946, Cámpora led an independent coalition of labourists and radicals and won a seat in the house of representatives, which he presided during the period 1948–1952. He was commissioned for a diplomatic trip through 17 countries as plenipotentiary ambassador in 1953. He was arrested and indicted for corruption and embezzlement by the Revolución Libertadora which overthrew Perón in 1955. After fleeing the country in 1956, he returned three years later when all the charges were dropped.

== From 1971 to July 1973 ==
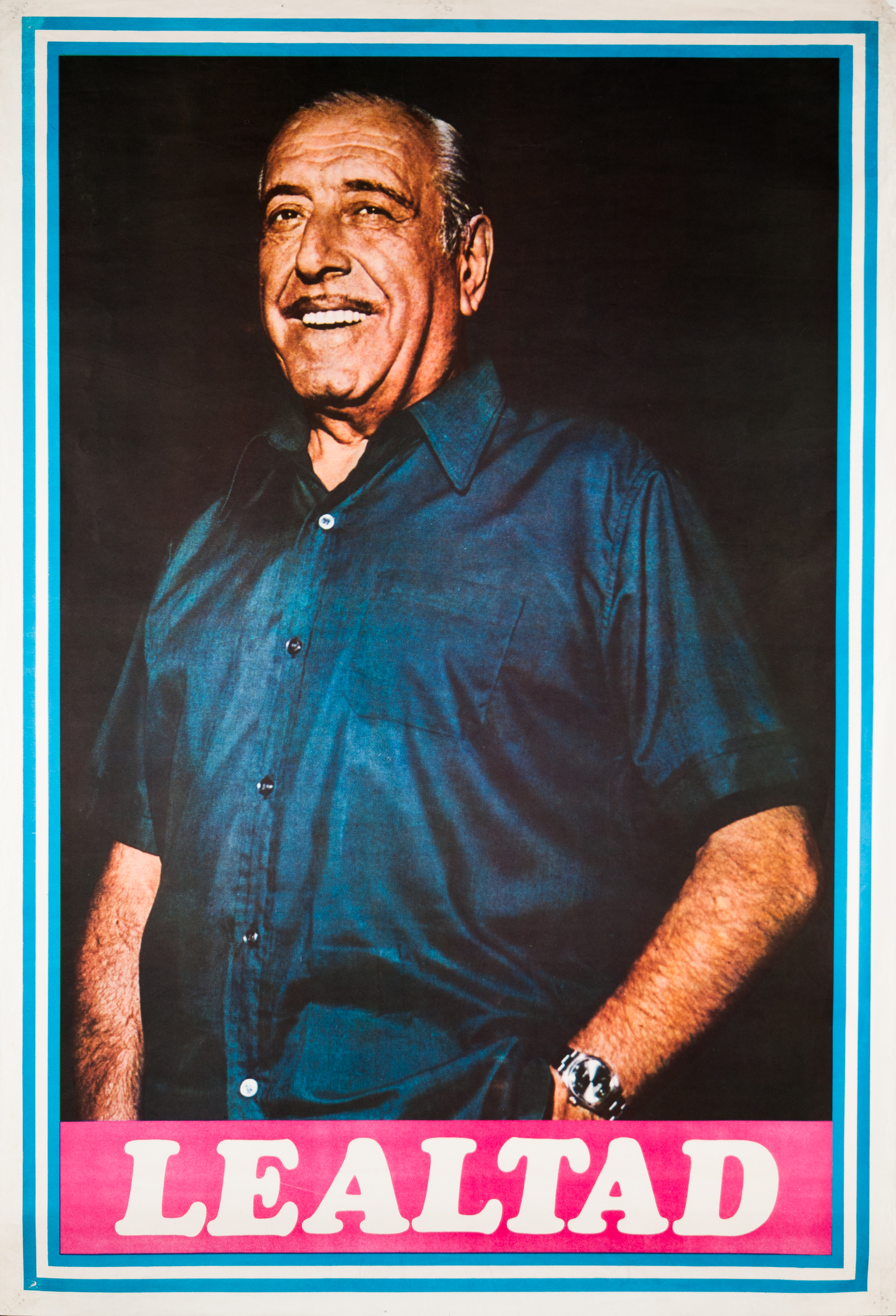
Candidate poster of Héctor Cámpora (1973)

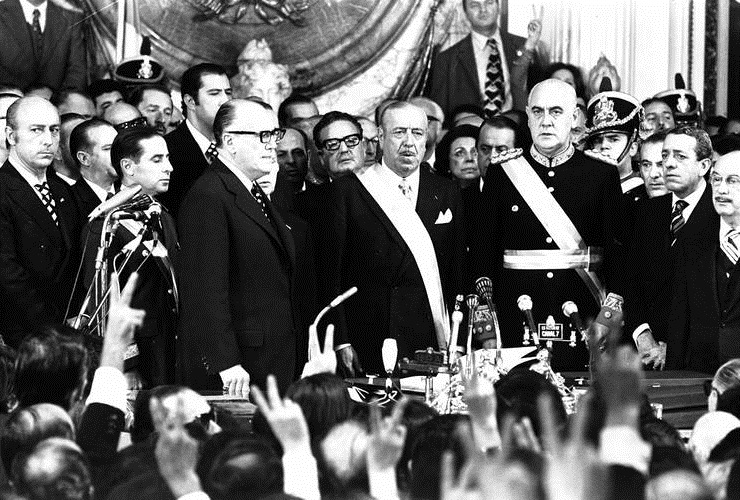
Cámpora takes the oath as President of Argentina in 1973. The then-president of Chile, Salvador Allende, can be seen over Cámpora's right shoulder.

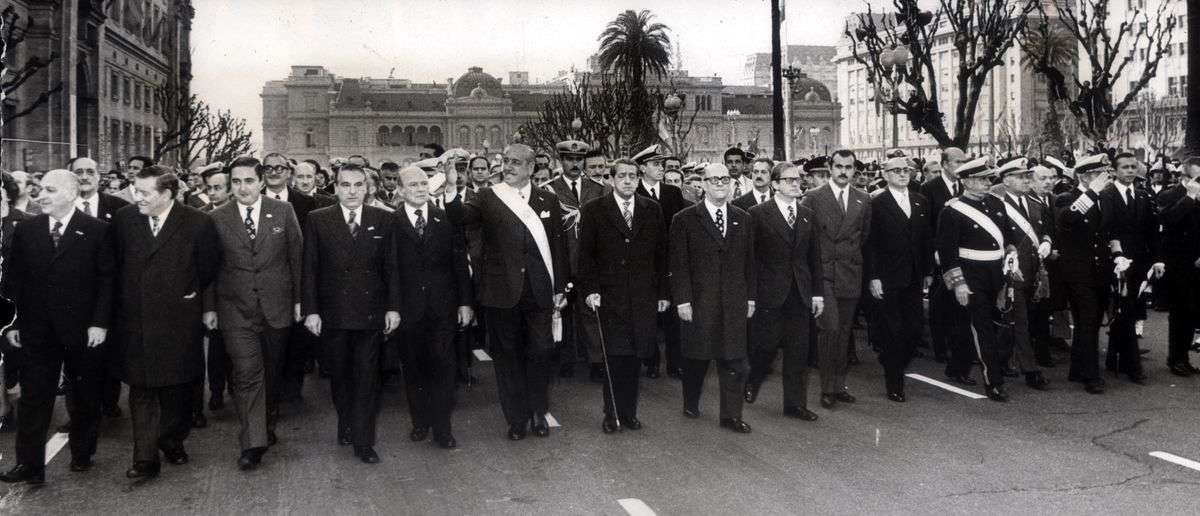
Cámpora appoint his Cabinet in Plaza de Mayo, when he was elected.

Perón chose him as his "personal delegate" in 1971. He ran for president in 1973 to circumvent the veto on Perón's participation in the election which had been issued by Argentine dictator General Alejandro Lanusse. His running-mate was Vicente Solano Lima. Despite Cámpora's own left-leaning tendencies, Solano Lima belonged to the Popular Conservative Party.

Cámpora won the March 1973 election with 49.6% of the votes. The Radical leader, Ricardo Balbín, had arrived second with 21.3%, but it was enough to include him in the runoff with Cámpora, as absolute majority was necessary to avoid a second ballot. However, he resigned his right in order to avoid a political crisis, and recognized his defeat. Cámpora assumed his functions on 25 May 1973, in the presence of Chilean President Salvador Allende and Cuban President Osvaldo Dorticós. A million people gathered on the Plaza de Mayo to acclaim the new President.

One of Cámpora's first presidential actions was a granting of amnesty to members of terrorist organizations who had carried out political assassinations and terror attacks against military and police personnel and who had been tried and sentenced to prison by judges. Once liberated, these terrorist began executing these judges for revenge.

On 28 May Argentina restored diplomatic relations with Cuba, which then received Argentine aid such as food and industrial products to break the United States embargo against Cuba.

During Cámpora's first months of government, approximatively 600 social conflicts, strikes and factory occupations had taken place. The revolutionary left had however suspended armed struggle, joining itself to the participatory democracy process, which created alarms in the Peronist right-wing bureaucracy.

Cámpora's ideology set him against the right-wing tendencies of Peronism. When Perón returned to Argentina on 20 June 1973, his plane had to be redirected to a military airport because at the gathering to greet his arrival at Buenos Aires' main airport, snipers affiliated with the right wing of Peronism attacked and killed a number of left-wing Peronist activists. This event, known as the Ezeiza Massacre, left 13 killed and more than 300 wounded.

José Ber Gelbard, president of the CGE, a small and medium-sized enterprise association, was designated as minister of economics. Gelbard tried to establish a "social pact" among the CGT workers and the "National Bourgeoisie", including a price freeze and widespread salary hikes.

Finally, on 13 July 1973, Cámpora resigned to allow Juan Perón to return to power. New elections were held on 23 September, twelve days after the Chilean coup. Cámpora was later designated as Argentine ambassador to Mexico.

== July 1973 to 1980 ==
After the March 1976 coup d'état that displaced Perón's successor, his widow Isabel Perón, Cámpora sought refuge at the Mexican embassy in Buenos Aires. Three years later, after being diagnosed with laryngeal cancer, he was allowed to fly to Mexico. Cámpora died in Cuernavaca a few months after his arrival, in December 1980.

== See also ==
- Peronism
- Montoneros
- Movimiento Nacionalista Tacuara
- Ezeiza massacre

Political offices
| Preceded by Ricardo Guardo | President of the Chamber of Deputies; 1948–1953 | Succeeded by Antonio J. Benítez |
| Preceded by Alejandro Lanusse | President of Argentina; 1973 | Succeeded by Raúl Lastiri |
