= Raúl Lastiri =

President of Argentina from July to October 1973

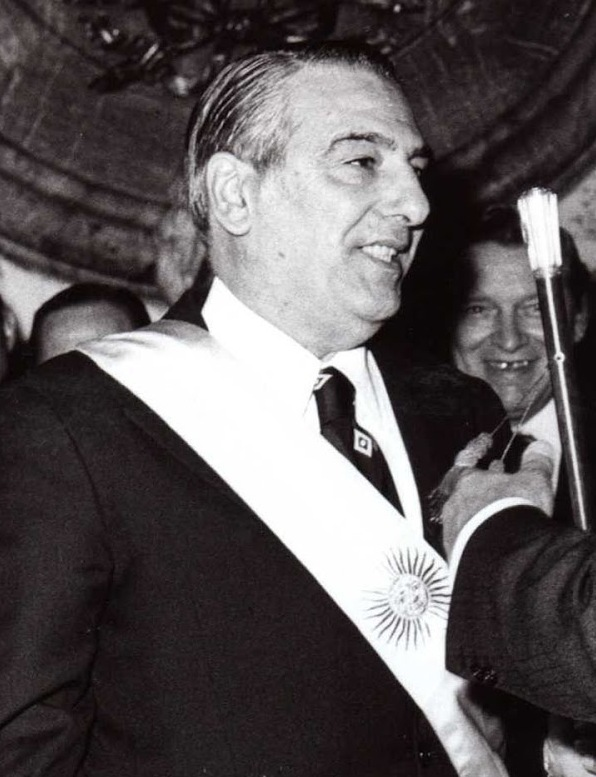
- Lastiri during his inauguration as president, 1973

39th President of Argentina
- Interim; 13 July 1973 – 12 October 1973
- Vice President: None
- Preceded by: Héctor José Cámpora
- Succeeded by: Juan Domingo Perón

President of the Chamber of Deputies
- In office 3 May 1973 – 7 July 1975
- Preceded by: Arturo Mor Roig
- Succeeded by: Nicasio Sánchez Toranzo

National Deputy
- In office 25 May 1973 – 24 March 1976
- Constituency: Buenos Aires

Personal details
- Born: Raúl Alberto Lastiri; 11 September 1915 Parque Patricios, Buenos Aires, Argentina
- Died: 11 December 1978 (aged 63) Buenos Aires, Argentina
- Party: Justicialist
- Spouses: Amelia Concepción Martino (m. 1943; div. 1971); Norma Beatriz López Rega (m. 1972)

Raúl Alberto Lastiri (11 September 1915 – 11 December 1978) was an Argentine politician who was interim president of Argentina from 13 July 1973 until 12 October 1973. Lastiri, who presided over the Argentine Chamber of Deputies, was promoted to the presidency of the country after Héctor Cámpora and Vicente Solano Lima resigned, he called new elections and delivered the country's government to Juan Perón, who won in September with over 60% of the votes.

== Biography ==
=== Family ===
His father, José María Lastiri, was born in Almandoz, Navarre in northern Spain, while his mother, María Ferrari was born in Rome, Lazio in central Italy. He has nine siblings.

=== Rise to power and fall ===
His brief tenure marked a turn towards right-wing policies and factions within the Peronist Party. His father-in-law, José López Rega, a P2 member and the creator of the paramilitary organization Triple A, was confirmed as Minister of Social Welfare. Alberto Juan Vignes replaced Puig in the Ministry of Foreign Affairs and Benito Llambí took over from Esteban Righi as Minister of Interior. In spite of this, Argentine foreign policy kept a Third World orientation; for example, in August 1973, Argentina granted Cuba a US$200 million loan to buy machinery and cars.

José Ber Gelbard, also confirmed as Economy Minister, continued with his previous policy, nationalizing bank deposits and announced a "Triennial Plan" for development.

Anti-government leftist violence experienced sustained growth in the last days of his presidency. On September 25 a Montoneros commando allegedly killed José Ignacio Rucci, Secretary-General of the CGT national trade union center and Perón's good friend. The same month, the Ejército Revolucionario del Pueblo (ERP) had assaulted the Army medical unit located at Parque Patricios, a neighborhood of Buenos Aires, killing an officer. This action served to justify the ERP illegalization and the closedown of the newspaper El Mundo.

Lastiri handed over the presidency to Perón on 12 October 1973. He remained as President of the Chamber of Deputies until 17 July 1975 when replaced by Nicasio Sánchez Sorondo. Lastiri's links to José López Rega resulted in the end of his political career when the latter marched to exile after being accused of abuse of power and corruption.

Lastiri was put under house arrest when the military dictatorship took power on 24 March 1976 and died on 11 December 1978.

==== Propaganda Due ====
Lastiri was on Licio Gelli's list of P2 members, a masonic lodge, discovered in 1980.

== Honours and awards ==
=== Foreign honours ===
- (Spain) Grand Cross of the Order of Isabella the Catholic (1973)
- (Czechoslovakia) Order of the White Lion, 2nd Class (1974)

Political offices
Vacant 1966 coup d'état Title last held by Arturo Mor Roig	President of the Chamber of Deputies; 1973–1975	Succeeded by Nicasio Sánchez Toranzo
Preceded by Héctor Cámpora	President of Argentina; 1973	Succeeded by Juan Perón
