= Alejandro Agustín Lanusse =

Dictator of Argentina from 1971 to 1973

Alejandro Lanusse
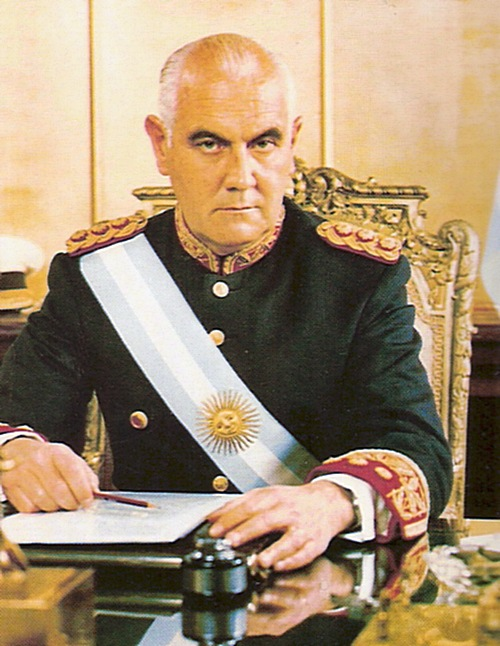

37th President of Argentina
- De facto
- In office 26 March 1971 – 25 May 1973
- Appointed by: Military junta
- Vice President: None
- Preceded by: Roberto Marcelo Levingston (de facto)
- Succeeded by: Héctor José Cámpora

Personal details
- Born: Alejandro Agustín Lanusse Gelly; 28 August 1918 Buenos Aires, Argentina
- Died: 26 August 1996 (aged 77) Buenos Aires, Argentina
- Party: Independent
- Spouse: Ileana María Bell Bidart
- Children: 10
- Profession: Military
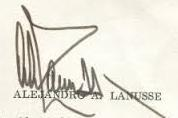
- Signature

Military service
- Allegiance: Argentina
- Branch/service: Argentine Army
- Years of service: 1938–1973
- Rank: Lieutenant General

Alejandro Agustín Lanusse Gelly (28 August 1918 – 26 August 1996) was the de facto president of the Argentine Republic between 26 March 1971 and 25 May 1973, during the military dictatorship of the country called the "Argentine Revolution".

On 26 March 1971, Lanusse assumed the presidency in a totally unfavorable political climate. Guerrilla violence grew, popular discontent also, the continuity of the military government became difficult to sustain. Lanusse evaluated that the solution to the multiple conflicts was to end the proscription of Peronism and to decree a political opening that allowed a transition towards democracy.

== Early life ==
He was born as Alejandro Agustín Lanusse Gelly on 28 August 1918, in Buenos Aires to Luis Gustavo Lanusse Justo and Albertina Gelly Cantilo. He was raised in an upper middle class family that had vast landholdings and interests in multiple commercial and industrial enterprises.

== Career ==
A graduate of the Army Academy (Colegio Militar de la Nación, class of 1938), he served in different Cavalry units before becoming commander of the Regimiento de Granaderos a Caballo (Regiment of Horse Grenadiers, presidential escort unit). In 1951, he was sentenced to life imprisonment for his part in an attempted coup against Juan Perón. He was released in 1955 with the Revolución Libertadora, a military uprising which ousted Perón and set up a military dictatorship which was in power from 1955 to 1958. In 1956, he was designated Ambassador to the Holy See.

In 1960, he became assistant director of the Superior Military School and later Commander of the First Armored Cavalry Division. In 1962, he took part in the overthrowing of president Arturo Frondizi, and, in 1966, supported General Juan Carlos Onganía in the ousting of president Arturo Illia, a decision which he later regretted. In 1968, he became Commander-in-Chief of the Argentine Army.

== Presidency ==
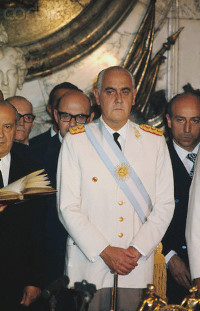
Alejandro Lanusse's presidential inauguration, 1971.

In contrast to the conservative Onganía, Lanusse was regarded by his aides as "the last liberal officer in the Argentine armed forces". In 1970, Lanusse led the coup that overthrew Onganía and installed General Roberto Levingston as president. Lanusse later called Levingston's appointment as a "barbarity" while defending the decision at the time, saying that "it was done so as to avoid what had been happening" under Onganía. After Levingston tried to dismiss Lanusse as commander-in-chief, Lanusse carried out another coup that overthrew Levingston and installed himself as president in 1971.

During his administration he continuously faced political unrest, with an increase in guerrilla activity. Many political opponents were jailed, and Lanusse decided to negotiate with the Montoneros (a Peronist guerrilla movement) for the return of the corpse of Evita (Eva Duarte de Perón), Juan Domingo Perón's second wife whose body had been hidden by the "Revolución Libertadora". This culminated in what became known as the "Grand National Accord". On 22 August 1971, several imprisoned guerrillas attempted to escape from the Naval Base of Rawson in Patagonia, and were executed without trial in the Trelew massacre.

During his administration he established diplomatic relations with China and publicly supported Chile's Socialist president, Salvador Allende, calling his death in the 1973 Chilean coup d'état a personal loss.

Lanusse ordered presidential elections that were held in March 1973 and won by Hector Cámpora. Lanusse was jostled and spat at as he left the Casa Rosada and the presidency. Despite saying that Perón, who was living in exile in Spain, would never return to Argentina "either because he doesn't want to, or doesn't have the guts", Lanusse helped arrange for Perón's arrival in Argentina in June 1973.

== Later years ==
In 1985, Lanusse published his autobiography, titled Confessions of a General, and criticized the human rights violations that took place during the Dirty War, including the state murder of his cousin, diplomat Elena Holmberg. He also testified against the leaders of the military regime during the Trial of the Juntas, having lost one of his press secretaries to a forced disappearance.

He was placed under house arrest in 1994 for criticizing president Carlos Menem in a magazine interview, having called him a "womanizer".

== Personal life and death ==
Lanusse was married to Ileana Bell and had nine children. He died in Buenos Aires on 26 August 1996 after undergoing surgery for a blood clot that had formed in his brain after a fall in his home.

Political offices
Preceded by Roberto Levingston	President of Argentina; 1971–1973	Succeeded by Héctor Cámpora
