= Demetrio Elíades Building =

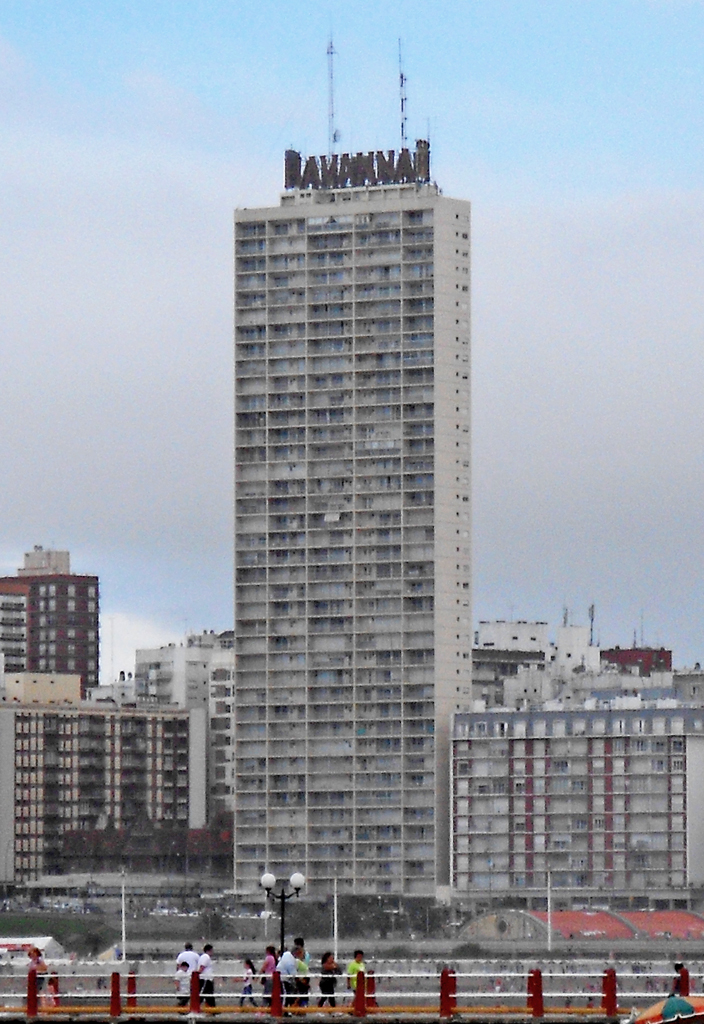
- Building in 2014
- Interactive map of the Demetrio Elíades Building area

General information
- Status: Completed
- Type: Residential
- Location: Avenida Patricio Peralta Ramos 2865; Mar del Plata, Argentina
- Coordinates: 38°00′32″S 57°32′16″W
- Construction started: August 1966
- Completed: 1969

Height
- Height: 125 m (410 ft)

Technical details
- Floor count: 39

Design and construction
- Architecture firm: DELCO

The Demetrio Elíades Building, also known as the Edificio Havanna, is a 125 m (410 ft)-tall residential skyscraper located in the city of Mar del Plata, Argentina. Constructed in 1969, it is the tallest building in Mar del Plata and the tallest building in the province of Buenos Aires, surpassing the Palacio Cosmos upon its construction.

== Location and design ==
The Demetrio Elíades Building stands at a height of 125 m (410 ft), with 39 stories and 273 apartment spaces. The building was constructed using over 60 tons of steel, 650,000 kilos of iron and a reinforced concrete partition in the design of a T-shape. No beams or columns were used to create the building, with prefabricated partitions used instead. The front of the building faces the Atlantic Ocean and as such is lined with balconies. The building is also located near the Casino Central.

== History ==
The building was constructed by Demetrio Elíades, an immigrant from Crete for whom the building is named, and his company, DELCO. Among the goals of Elíades and his company was to alter the skyline of Mar del Plata to make it more similar to that of New York City. The company had built several other buildings in Mar del Plata, including the Palacio Edén. The construction of the structure, initially referred to as the Belvedere Palace, was first proposed in 1964 by architect Antonio Dompé.

Work began on the building in August 1966. The construction of the building involved some of the earliest usage of aluminum carpentry in Argentina. Building occurred quickly, with one floor being completed every ten days. The building was completed in 1969. At the time of its completion, the building was the second-tallest in the country. A large sign with the words "Havanna", which illuminates daily, was added to the building in 1970. On December 4 of that year, the name of the building was changed to honor Elíades, who died during the building's construction.

The building had been granted several irregular exceptions in building in order to facilitate its construction, which led to accusations of corruption amongst government officials in 1970.

== In popular culture ==
During the 1980s, the Argentine government used a panoramic rendition of Mar del Plata, with the Demetrio Elíades Building visible, on the 5000 peso bill. Bruno Leonardo Gelber, a famous pianist, and Carlos Balá, an actor, have both resided in the building.
