= Palacio Cosmos =

Apartment building in Mar del Plata, Argentina

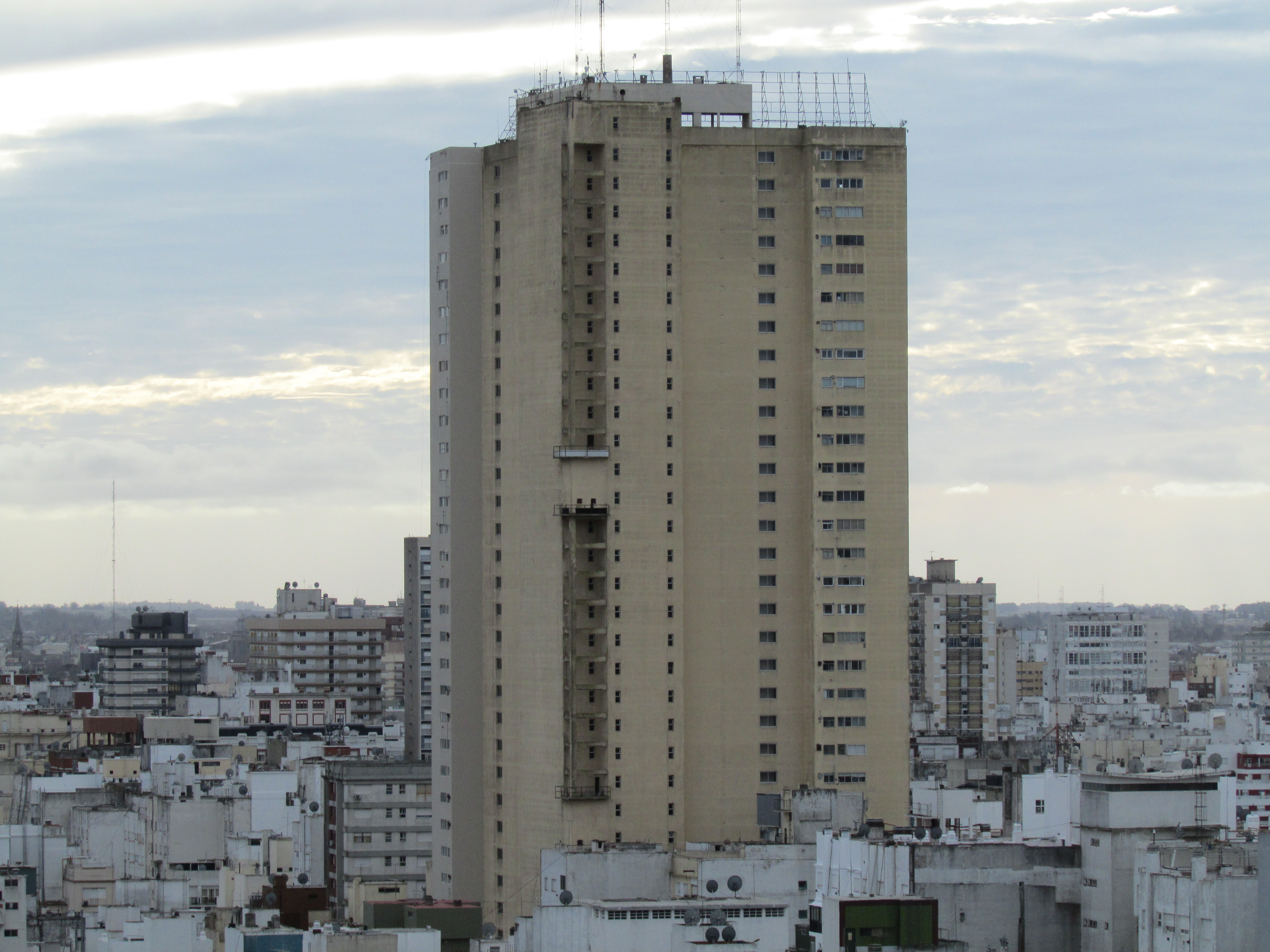
- Palacio Cosmos in 2013
- Interactive map of the Palacio Cosmos area

General information
- Status: Completed
- Type: Apartments
- Location: Colón 1550; Mar del Plata, Argentina
- Coordinates: 38°00′32″S 57°32′16″W
- Completed: 1964

Height
- Height: 119 m (390 ft)

Technical details
- Floor count: 38

Design and construction
- Architecture firm: DELCO S.A.

Palacio Cosmos is a residential building located in the city of Mar del Plata, Argentina. At 119 m (390 ft) tall, it is the second tallest building in Mar del Plata, behind the Demetrio Elíades Building.

== Design ==
Edificio Cosmos is 119 m (390 ft) tall with 38 floors. 35 hold apartments, with each floor having 8 for a total of 280 throughout the building, with 2 basements and parking spots available in the building. The ground floor of the Palacio Cosmos consists of commercial space. The building is known for its "L" shape as well as the design of the building, which was modernistic for the time. The Palacio Cosmos has large windows on each floor.

== History ==
Palacio Cosmos was constructed by architect Juan Antonio Dompé, who also built the Palacio Edén and the Demetrio Elíades Building. The building's construction was financed by DELCO S.A, and it opened to the public in 1964. Palacio Cosmos was constructed during a major building boom in Mar del Plata, which saw the construction of most of the city's tallest buildings. At the time of its inauguration, it was the tallest building in Mar del Plata. The building's construction was technically not permitted due to building regulations in Mar del Plata, however in practice these laws were routinely not enforced. For several decades, the building contained advertisements for Pepsi which were displayed on the top of the building. Because of this, the Palacio Cosmos has sometimes been nicknamed the "Pepsi Building".

== In popular culture ==
During the 1980s, the Argentine government used a panoramic rendition of Mar del Plata, with the Palacio Cosmos visible, on the 5000 peso bill.
