= Carlos Noel =

Argentine politician (1886–1941)

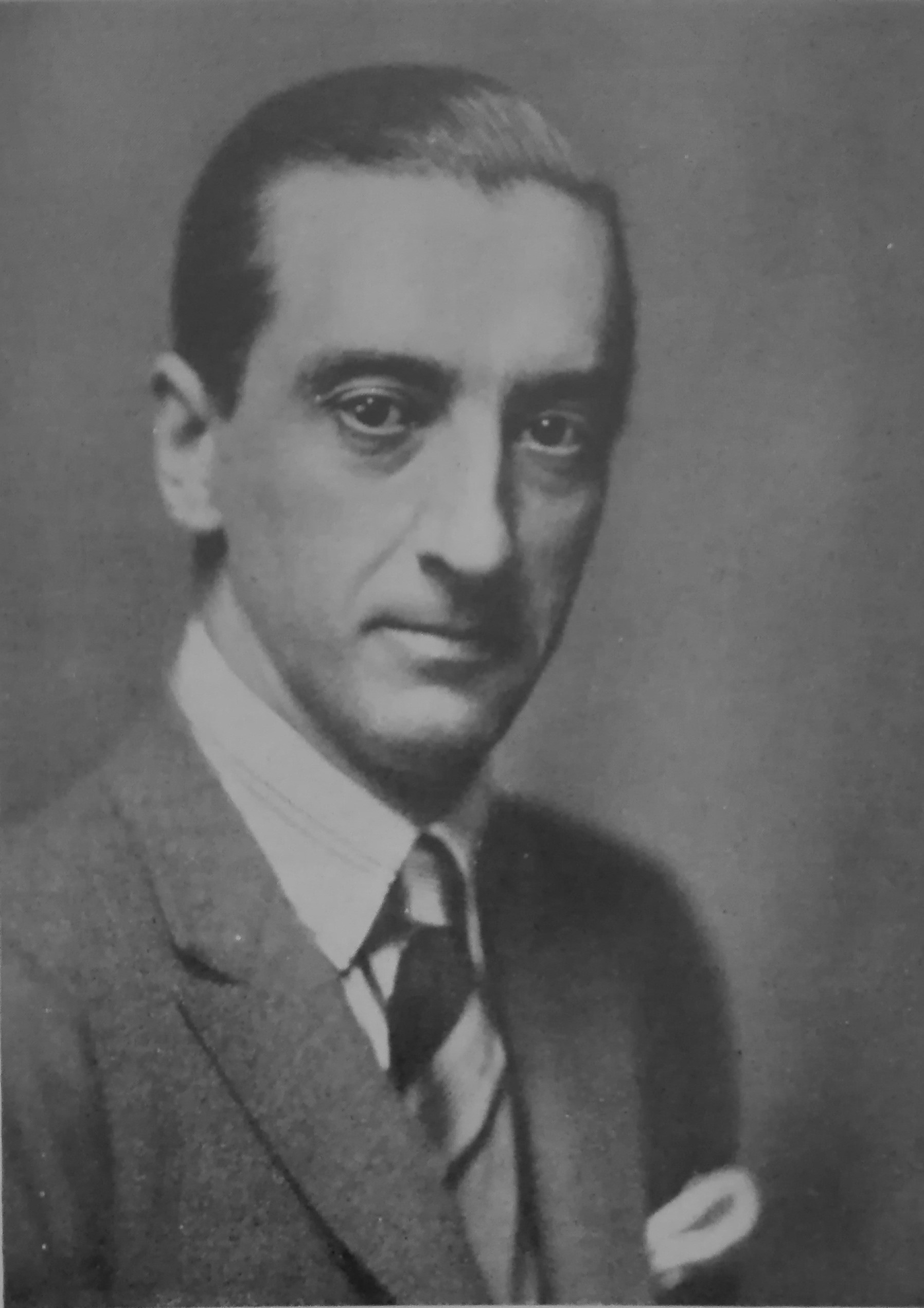
- Noel in 1936

President of the Chamber of Deputies
- In office 25 April 1940 – 3 January 1941
- Preceded by: Juan Gaudencio Kaiser
- Succeeded by: José Luis Cantilo
- In office 25 April 1936 – 25 April 1938
- Preceded by: Manuel Fresco
- Succeeded by: Juan Gaudencio Kaiser

National Deputy
- In office 1936 – 3 January 1941
- Constituency: Federal Capital

Mayor of Buenos Aires
- In office 16 October 1922 – 3 May 1927
- President: Marcelo Torcuato de Alvear
- Preceded by: Virgilio Tedín Uriburu
- Succeeded by: Horacio Casco

Personal details
- Born: 30 August 1886 Buenos Aires, Argentina
- Died: 3 January 1941 (aged 54) Poços de Caldas, Brazil
- Party: Radical Civic Union

Carlos Martín Noel (30 August 1886 – 3 January 1941) was an Argentine diplomat and politician of the Radical Civic Union. He served as intendente (mayor) of Buenos Aires from 1922 to 1927, and later went on to serve in the Chamber of Deputies from 1936 until his death in 1941. Noel was president of the Chamber of Deputies on two occasions, from 1936 to 1938, and later from 1940 to 1941.

His tenure as mayor of Buenos Aires is remembered for the "Plan Noel", an urbanistic roadmap for the city which sought to include, for the first time in the history of Buenos Aires, native-born Argentine architects (as opposed to European and North American architects).

== Early life and career ==
Noel was born on 30 August 1886 in Buenos Aires into a wealthy family of Spanish immigrants. He attended the prestigious Colegio Nacional de Buenos Aires, graduating in 1904, and later studied diplomacy and literature at the École des Hautes Études en Sciences Sociales and the Sorbonne, in Paris.

Noel became politically active in the Radical Civic Union upon his return to Argentina in 1915, focusing his activities in San Fernando and Tigre, in Buenos Aires Province. He was later appointed president of the Unión Industrial Argentina, and in 1917, he was elected to the municipal council of Las Conchas. In 1920, he was posted to the Argentine embassy in Chile by President Hipólito Yrigoyen, and later ascended to ambassador of Argentina in Chile.

== Mayor of Buenos Aires ==
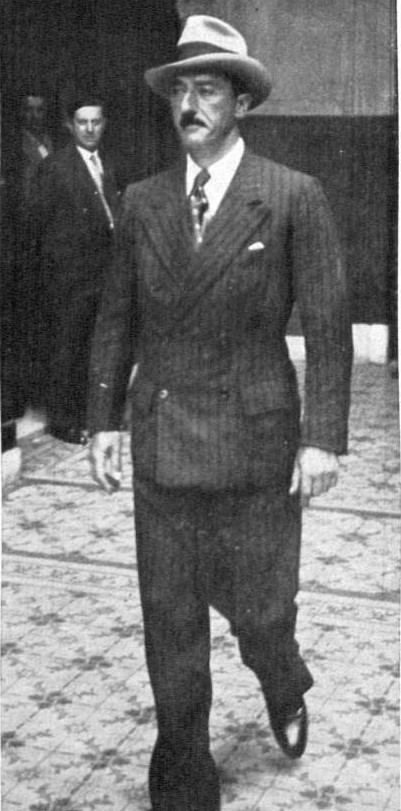
Carlos Noel in 1930.

In 1922, President Marcelo Torcuato de Alvear appointed Noel as intendente (mayor) of Buenos Aires. In 1923, Noel established the municipal "Commission on Architectural Aesthetic". In September 1925, Noel published a book wherein he laid out a new urbanistic plan for the city of Buenos Aires. The plan (revolutionary for its inclusion of Argentine architects) shifted the municipal government's attention away from the city centre and into the new neighbourhoods developing in the peripheries of the city, especially those populated by working-class immigrant families – at least half of Buenos Aires was populated by immigrants at the turn of the 1920s. The plan envisioned different commercial poles acting as "multiple city centres", with monumental civic buildings and a public park system, and for what would decades later become the Aeroparque Jorge Newbery.

Although the "Plan Noel" was never fully carried out, many of its proposals were completed during Noel's mayorship and in following years by successive administrations. Among these was the "reconquest of the River", the completion of the two diagonals (Avenida Roque Sáenz Peña and Avenida Presidente Julio Argentino Roca) and Avenida Santa Fe, the creation of new working-class neighbourhoods and kindergartens, the railway bridge over Avenida San Martín, and the establishment of the Bernardino Rivadavia Natural Sciences Argentine Museum and the Colonial Art Museum, housed in the Palacio Noel (named after the mayor).

It was, for a time, proposed that the avenue facing the Río de la Plata on the northern side of Buenos Aires be known as "Avenida Intendente Carlos Noel".

Noel resigned from the mayorship in 1927. He was subject to persecution during the dictatorship of José Félix Uriburu due to his affiliation with the Radical Civic Union, and had to go into exile.

== Congressman ==
Noel was elected to the Argentine Chamber of Deputies in the 1936 legislative election, having run in Buenos Aires. He was elected as President of the Chamber in April 1936, shortly after taking office, and served in the position until 1938, and later from 1940 to 1941. As deputy, Noel formed part of the Commission on Foreign Affairs and lobbied for the establishment of the National Economic Council in 1938. He also pushed for the creation of the National Directorate of Urbanism and the sanctioning of the municipal urbanisation law.

In addition to his preoccupation with urban development, Noel took part in debates on Argentina's foreign policy, especially with neighbouring South American nations. Inspired by the system employed by the French diplomatic service, Noel pushed for reforms to professionalise the Argentine diplomatic corps, and sought to position Argentina as a mediator in the Chaco War.

He was re-elected in 1940, but died the following year on 3 January 1941, aged 54, in Poços de Caldas, Brazil.

== Personal life ==
Noel's colonial-style residence in the Retiro neighbourhood of Buenos Aires, designed by his architect brother Martín S. Noel, later became one of the two buildings of the Museo de Arte Hispanoamericano Isaac Fernández Blanco (formerly Museo de Arte Colonial) and is nowadays known as "Palacio Noel". The museum hosts an extensive collection of Spanish and Latin American art (particularly of the Cuzco School) amassed by Isaac Fernández Blanco.

He was married to Josefina Acosta Font.

Political offices
Preceded by Virgilio Tedín Uriburu	Mayor of Buenos Aires; 1922–1927	Succeeded by Horacio Casco
Preceded by Manuel Fresco	President of the Chamber of Deputies; 1940–1941	Succeeded by Juan Gaudencio Kaiser
Preceded by Juan Gaudencio Kaiser	President of the Chamber of Deputies; 1940–1941	Succeeded by José Luis Cantilo
