= NH Gran Hotel Provincial =

Hotel in Mar del Plata, Argentina

General information
- Location: Mar del Plata, Argentina
- Coordinates: 38°00′21″S 57°32′29″W
- Opening: February 18, 1950; February 8, 2009
- Owner: NH Hotels

Technical details
- Floor count: 4
- Floor area: 77,500 square metres (834,000 ft^{2})

Design and construction
- Architect: Alejandro Bustillo
- Developer: Province of Buenos Aires

Other information
- Number of rooms: 469
- Number of suites: 12
- Number of restaurants: 1
- Parking: 600

Website
- Official website

The NH Gran Hotel Provincial is a historic five star beach resort hotel in Mar del Plata, Argentina.

== Overview ==
The hotel is one of a pair of twin buildings designed in 1937 by architect Alejandro Bustillo. Inspired by the seafront Hotel du Palais in Biarritz, France, the hotel and neighboring Casino Central remain architectural landmarks of the city of Mar del Plata as well as of Argentina. The Casino opened on December 22, 1939 and President Ramón Castillo inaugurated the Rambla in December 1941. Work on the 500-room hotel slowed, however, and it was not completed for nearly ten years. The hotel's lobby featured murals painted by César Bustillo (the architect's son) and its decoration was planned by famed French designer Jean-Michel Frank (who was in Argentina at work on the Llao Llao Hotel) together with Casa Comte.

The structure was completed in 1948 and the Hotel Provincial opened on February 18, 1950, and was long the largest in Argentina. The neighboring Casino Central was the largest in the world by floor space until the 1990 opening of Trump Taj Mahal Casino Resort, in Atlantic City.

Operation of the publicly-owned hotel was privatized in 1984, with the concession granted to Empresa Hotelera Americana. Ongoing losses led the operator to withdraw from the business at the end of 1998, and the provincial government closed the hotel.

The hotel remained shuttered for a decade, until the province obtained an investment bid from Madrid-based NH Hotels, in April 2008. Following US$30 million refurbishment directed by local architect Alejandro Novakovsky, the hotel reopened on February 8, 2009.

Its 77,500 square metres (834,000 sq ft) of floor area includes 469 rooms and 12 suites, as well as a convention center.

The hotel has hosted numerous Mar del Plata Film Festivals, as well as the 2010 Ibero-American Summit. Its more notable international guests have included actors Gina Lollobrigida and Paul Newman.

== Architecture ==
The buildings of the Central Casino and the Gran Hotel Provincial were designed by Alejandro Bustillo in 1937. For them, he made use of his characteristic Neoclassical style, with strong French inspiration, adapted—according to his own words—to the local environment. In this case, Bustillo was inspired by the Louis XIII style of the buildings of the Place Vendôme in Paris.

According to the rules of classical composition, the façade consists of a base clad in Mar del Plata stone, with a covered gallery; a main body faced in exposed brick, with ornaments and pilasters in Mar del Plata stone; and a crowning mansard roof of black slate. However, to demonstrate that Bustillo placed aesthetics over functionality or reality, beneath that artificial mansard there is a reinforced concrete slab which is the actual structural roof. The building has a ground floor (base), six storeys, and a mansard.
