= Marco Aurelio Avellaneda =

Argentinian politician (1835–1911)

Marco Aurelio Avellaneda (1835 – January 29, 1911) was a prominent Argentine legislator and official. He was a deputy and senator of the nation and served in the ministry three times.

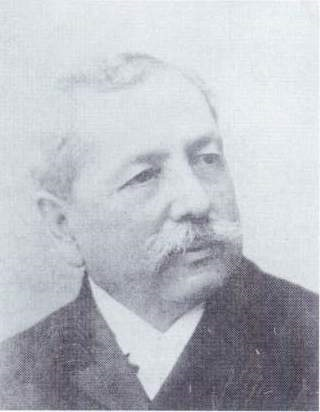
Image of Avellaneda

== Biography ==
Marco Aurelio Martín Avellaneda y Silva was born in San Miguel de Tucumán, Tucumán, Argentina, in 1835, the son of Marco Manuel de Avellaneda and Dolores de Silva y Zavaleta. He was the brother of Nicolás Avellaneda, the future Argentine president, and of the legislator Eudoro Avellaneda.

He graduated with a doctorate in law from the University of Buenos Aires, later dedicating himself to politics. He was a national deputy for his province for the period 1876–1880 and was re-elected on other occasions until 1901. Dean of legislators, for 11 years he served as president of the Chamber of Deputies. He was the national auditor in the province of Corrientes and in the province of Buenos Aires.

He was appointed president of the Inspection Office of Guaranteed Banks until April 1890, when he resigned in the midst of the serious economic crisis during the government of Miguel Juárez Celman for refusing to authorize an issue of two million by the National Bank that promoted Minister Wenceslao Pacheco when the institution already lacked reserves. Finally, Pacheco would be forced to leave the ministry but would become president of the bank and carry out clandestine issues that would aggravate the crisis and cause the bankruptcy of the institution.

Between June 7, 1893, and July 18, 1893, he was minister of finance for President Luis Sáenz Peña. In June 1901, he was again appointed minister of finance by President Julio Argentino Roca, serving in the position until 1902.

On November 21, 1906, he became minister of the interior of President José Figueroa Alcorta, serving until September 27, 1907.

In 1909, he became a national senator until his death, which took place in the Tigre district on January 29, 1911.

=== Sáenz Peña law ===
In 1910, during the Senate's treatment of the electoral reform law known as the Sáenz Peña Law, Marco Aurelio Avellaneda led the attack on the project, defending the complete list system "under whose system the country had achieved all its progress" and calling the "harmless, undemocratic, and unconstitutional" reform.

Already from the time of his passage through the Chamber of Deputies, he unofficially proposed a system of elections controlled by the government but guaranteeing sufficient transparency: "my opinion is that the government, in consultation, passes the best decision to some people of recognized honesty, without excluding in an absolute way to no circle and without giving any a decisive preponderance, elect as Deputy among the honorable men of the country, more or less intelligent, more or less of good position, those who inspire the most confidence and with whose determined support he can count for your administrative progress for the good of the country (...) I wholeheartedly applaud the resolution you have made to exercise your influence in the provincial elections (...) Although the immense majority that makes the choice does not act with independence and knowledge, but rather by the influence to which it obeys, I believe that the most legitimate is that of the government, which is especially in charge of preserving public order, which is as a general rule the most impartial as it should be above the miseries and passions of the circles and which is finally the one that has the most responsibility since that of the circles is null due to the collective reason for being. What has been the result of the electoral struggles in which the governments have been or wanted to be dispensed with?" But this intervention had to have limits "I have been an opponent of certain electoral governments (...) I have fought and will always fight the abuse of official influence of the government that without consulting anything other than its whims, making the most unfriendly candidates to the people triumph against all odds (...) and I will always severely criticize governments that do not keep in mind the true conveniences of the country (sic) and that do not consult above all honesty and suitability for political positions.

And he continued: "here, as the time for the appointment of Deputies approaches, public indifference increases. As you have seen the copy of the Civic Registry that is published, you will not find a well-known name. The commercial and speculative spirit has invaded in such a way to all classes of society that no one is concerned other than finding means to earn money. The elections are made by (...) individuals who register assumed names, where people are hooked to vote and whoever returns for the vote would be disappointed. interest with which the newspapers deal with the electoral issue (…) The majority of the population does not read the newspapers but rather the advertisements from merchants . "

== Bibliography ==
- Cutolo, Vicente Osvaldo (1968). New Argentine biographical dictionary (1750-1930) . Buenos Aires: Editorial Elche.
- Yaben, Jacinto R. (1952). Argentine and South American biographies . Buenos Aires: Argentine Historical Editions.
