= Manuel Fresco =

Argentine politician (1888–1971)

Manuel Antonio Fresco
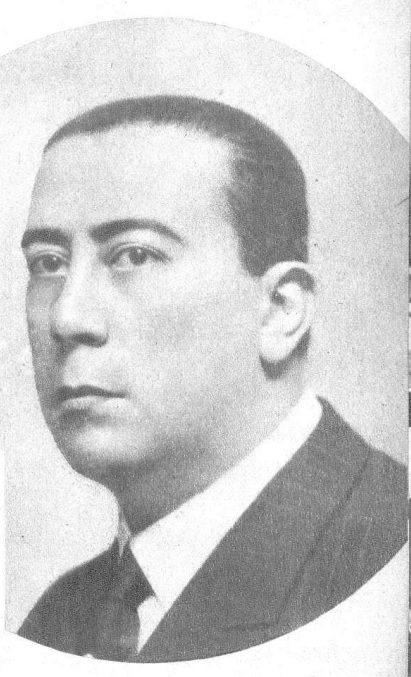

Governor of Buenos Aires
- In office 18 February 1936 – 7 March 1940
- Preceded by: Raul Díaz
- Succeeded by: Luis Ángel Cassinelli

President of the Chamber of Deputies
- In office 25 Abril 1934 – 25 April 1936
- Preceded by: Juan Félix Cafferata
- Succeeded by: Carlos Noel

Personal details
- Born: 3 June 1888 Navarro, Argentina
- Died: 17 November 1971 (aged 83) Haedo, Argentina
- Party: National Democratic Party
- Spouse: Raquel de Monasterio
- Children: 3
- Education: University of Buenos Aires

Manuel Antonio Justo Pastor Pascual Fresco (June 3, 1888 in Navarro, Buenos Aires – November 17, 1971 in Buenos Aires) was an Argentine doctor and Politician, national deputy and governor of Buenos Aires Province between 1936 and 1940 for the conservative National Democratic Party.

== Early life and education ==
Fresco was the son of Manuel Antonio Fresco from Salta and María Josefa Escarpati. During his youth he devoted himself to fencing, achieving some sporting success. He received his medical degree in 1914 at the University of Buenos Aires; one of his classmates was the socialist leader Alicia Moreau de Justo.

== Career ==
=== Medical and early political career ===
Installed in Avellaneda, province of Buenos Aires, he was an active collaborator of the local conservative caudillo, Alberto Barceló. Later he was appointed doctor of the Western Railway of Buenos Aires, settling for life in the town of Haedo

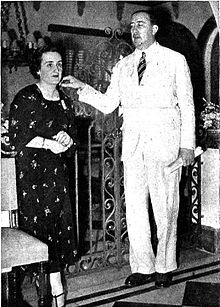

In the year 1919 he became a deputy of the Province of Buenos Aires, occupying a vacancy until the following year, and in 1922 he was again elected provincial deputy. After two years of recess, he was elected deputy again in 1928; he stood out as an opponent of the governments of the Radical Civic Union of the time. He was wounded by a bullet in a political act in February 1930 in the town of Lincoln, saving his life thanks to the doctor Enrique Finochietto. He supported the 1930 coup d'etat, which began the so-called Infamous Decade.

He was a municipal commissioner for Morón Partido during the de facto presidency of José Félix Uriburu, and sympathized with the Spanish dictator Miguel Primo de Rivera's leaning toward corporatism. He exercised tight control over the sale of merchandise, especially food. In 1932 he was elected national deputy; He served as president of the Chamber of Deputies of the Argentine Nation from 1934, under the influence of President Agustín Pedro Justo. He stood out by announcing his disagreement with democracy as it was exercised in his time, intending to replace the National Congress with a parliament of technical specialists.

=== Governor of Buenos Aires ===
After the resignation of Governor Federico Martínez de Hoz, who intended not to commit electoral fraud again, the National Democratic Party appointed him as its candidate for Governor of the Province of Buenos Aires, a position he achieved thanks to the widespread application of fraud and use of provincial funds for proselytizing acts; he mobilized large numbers of supporters by means of special trains, initiating a particular form of mass democracy. His campaign slogan, referring to the radicals, was "They will not pass!"

Manuel Fresco took office as Governor of the Province of Buenos Aires on February 18, 1936, accompanied by Deputy Governor Aurelio Amoedo, leader of the town of Marcos Paz, Buenos Aires. In his inauguration speech, he denounced the secret ballot, inciting an electoral reform to make the "vote at sight".

The large amount of public building work had an additional striking component, through the buildings of the monumental and spectacular architecture of Francisco Salamone, who built public buildings in an art deco and futuristic style, with a distant inspiration in the architecture of the fascist regimes. and Nazi, in many of the towns in the interior of the province. building dozens of hospitals, town halls, cemeteries, Catholic churches, schools, paved roads and routes. Although it is often said that there was a friendship between the governor and Salamone, in reality, this has not been proven.

Fresco's ministers were notable figures, such as the agricultural engineer José María Bustillo, his Minister of Public Works, who was accompanied by the activity of his brother, the architect Alejandro Bustillo; this left its mark on the architecture of the San Carlos de Bariloche region and also on the architecture of Buenos Aires public work, as in the case of the Casino and the Provincial Hotel of Mar del Plata, designed for the growth of the city as a new mass spa after the paving of route 2.

Other renowned ministers were Roberto Noble, who later founded the Clarín newspaper, and Cesar Ameghino, who later became the Ministry of Foreign Affairs and Worship of the governments of the 1943 Argentine coup d'état.

=== Political influences ===
Fresco was an emphatic admirer of the President of the United States, the Democrat Franklin D. Roosevelt, from whom he followed his public policies. But at the same time, in different speeches, he praised the totalitarian regimes of the German National Socialist Adolf Hitler and the Italian fascist Benito Mussolini, whose busts adorned his office. He declared the Italian Communist Party illegal. Shortly afterwards he proclaimed that his government was guided by the teachings of the Church through the encyclical Rerum Novarum. In line with this idea, he promoted the construction of cheap housing for the workers, which only remained in preliminary plans, and tried to force the businessmen to pay better wages and a family salary.

Political offices
Preceded by Juan Félix Cafferata	President of the Chamber of Deputies; 1934–1936	Succeeded by Carlos Noel
Preceded by Raul Díaz	Governor of Buenos Aires; 1936–1940	Succeeded by Luis Ángel Cassinelli
