= Juan Gaudencio Kaiser =

Argentine politician (1869–1952)

Juan G. Kaiser
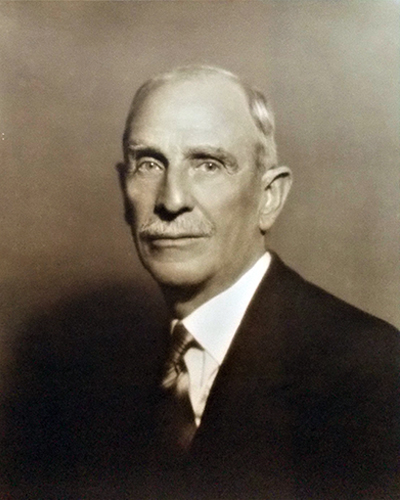

President of the Chamber of Deputies
- In office 25 April 1938 – 3 January 1940
- Preceded by: Carlos Noel
- Succeeded by: Carlos Noel

National Deputy
- In office 27 April 1936 – 25 April 1940
- Constituency: Buenos Aires

Mayor of Luján
- In office January 1909 – 31 December 1910
- Preceded by: Juan B. Barnech
- Succeeded by: José María Pérez

Personal details
- Born: 16 September 1869 Buenos Aires, Argentina
- Died: 1 February 1952 (aged 82) Luján, Argentina
- Party: National Democratic Party

Juan Gaudencio Kaiser (16 September 1869 – 1 February 1952) was an Argentine businessman and politician of the National Democratic Party. He served as intendente (mayor) of Luján, Buenos Aires, from 1909 to 1910, and later served as President of the National Chamber of Deputies from 1938 to 1940.

== Early life ==
Kaiser was born on 16 September 1869 in Buenos Aires. Shortly after his birth, his family moved to Luján, Buenos Aires, fleeing a yellow fever epidemic in the capital. He attended high school in France, before returning to Argentina in 1886. Back in Luján, Kaiser married Francisca Echandi, daughter of a carpenter.

Kaiser worked as a primary school teacher before joining the Radical Revolution of 1893. In 1897, he was appointed as secretary of the magistrate's court of Luján. He served a number of times as member of the Luján City Council, eventually becoming its president. In 1904, he founded La Opinión, which remained the main newspaper in Luján for some time.

== Political career ==
Despite having formed part of the Radical Civic Union (UCR) during its early years, he would later become a member of the National Democratic Party, the country's main conservative party, as did many former UCR members who supported the gubernatorial candidacy of Bernardo de Irigoyen in 1898.

Having served as secretary to mayor Juan B. Barnech from 1905 to 1906, he would later be elected mayor in his own right in 1909, and later in 1915. He was also a member of the Buenos Aires Province Chamber of Deputies, and in 1936 he was elected to the Argentine Chamber of Deputies for a four-year term. He was president of both chambers: from 5 December 1934 to 27 April 1936 he presided the provincial chamber, and from 1938 to 1940 he presided the national chamber. He was also a member of the province's Constitutional Convention in 1934. As president of the National Chamber of Deputies, he attended the first Flag Day celebrations in Rosario in 1938.

Kaiser fell from grace due to a bribery case in El Palomar in 1940, and he was declared guilty by a local court. He later went into exile in Uruguay. President Juan Perón granted him pardon shortly before his death in 1952, in Luján.

Political offices
Preceded by Juan B. Barnech	Mayor of Luján; 1909–1910	Succeeded by José María Pérez
Preceded by Luis María Berro	President of the Chamber of Deputies of Buenos Aires; 1934–1936	Succeeded by Roberto Mario Uzal
Preceded by Carlos Noel	President of the Chamber of Deputies; 1939–1940	Succeeded by Carlos Noel
