= Marcelino Ugarte =

Argentinian politician

Doctor Marcelino Ugarte
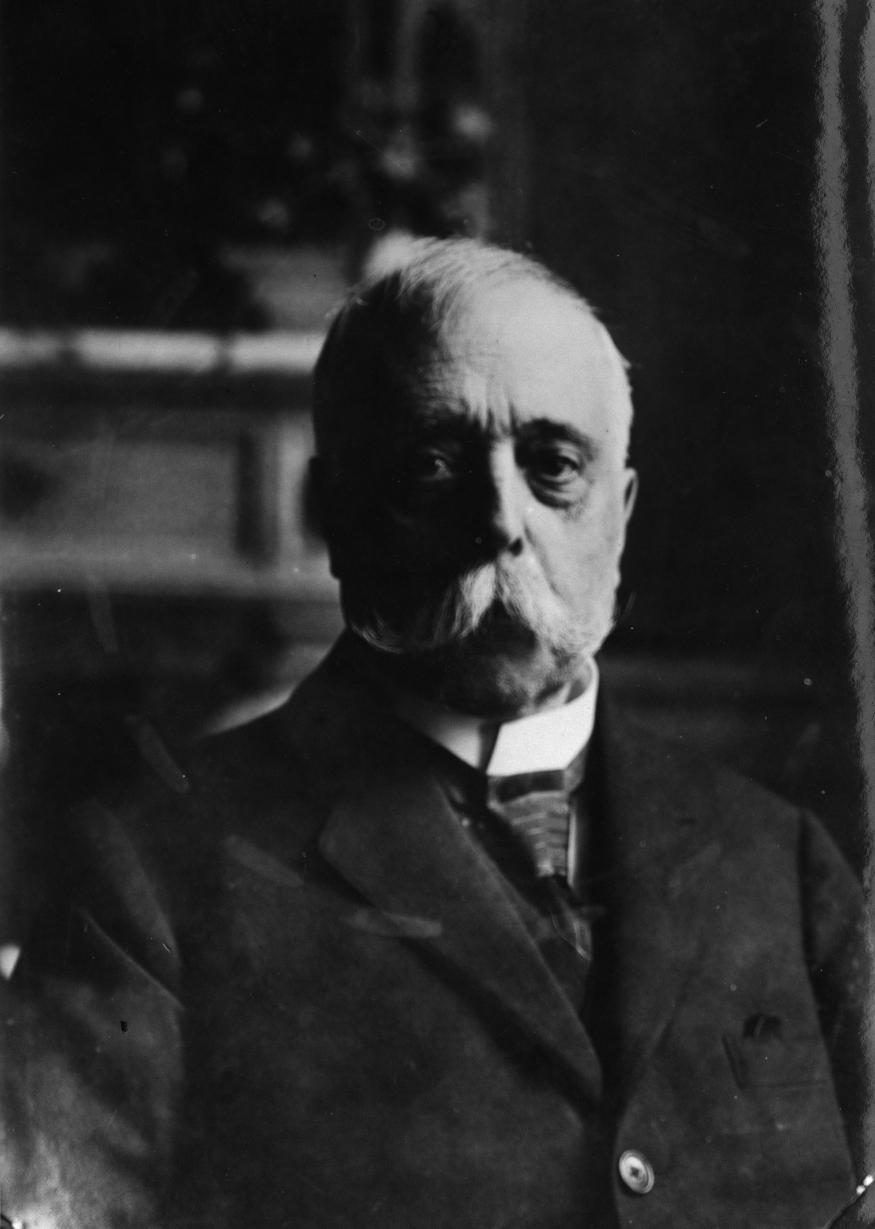

Governor of Buenos Aires Province
- In office 1902–1906
- Preceded by: Bernardo de Irigoyen
- Succeeded by: Ignacio Darío Irigoyen

Governor of Buenos Aires Province
- In office 1914–1917
- Preceded by: Luis García
- Succeeded by: José Luis Cantilo

National Senator by Buenos Aires Province
- In office 1913–1914

National Deputy by Buenos Aires Province
- In office 1900–1902

Personal details
- Born: Marcelino Germán Ugarte Lavalle; May 28, 1855 Buenos Aires, Argentina
- Died: August 6, 1929 (aged 74) Buenos Aires, Argentina
- Resting place: La Recoleta Cemetery
- Party: National Autonomist Party
- Spouse: Carolina Tomkinson de Alvear

Marcelino Ugarte (1855–1929) was an Argentine jurist and politician, who served for two terms as governor of the province of Buenos Aires. He also served as deputy and national senator for the province of Buenos Aires.

He was born in Buenos Aires, the son of Marcelino Ugarte and Adela Jerónima Lavalle, belonging to an aristocatric family of the city. He was married to Carolina Tomkinson Alvear, daughter of Enrique Tomkinson, born in Endon, England, and Virginia de Alvear y Sáenz de la Quintanilla, a noble lady belonging to the family of Carlos María de Alvear.

His father was Minister of Foreign Affairs of the Argentine Nation during the presidency of Bartolomé Mitre. By maternal line, he was a nephew grandson of Juan Lavalle, governor of Buenos Aires between 1828 and 1829, and descendant of Guillermo Ross, a Scottish soldier, who served as acting governor of Buenos Aires in the mid-18th century.
