= José Luis Cantilo =

Argentine politician (1871–1944)

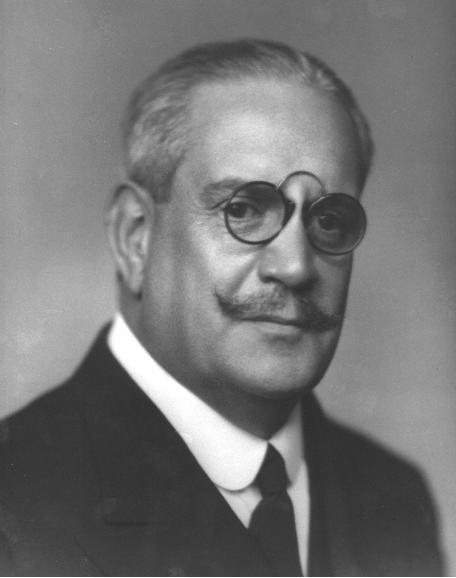
- Cantilo c. 1930

President of the Chamber of Deputies
- In office 25 April 1941 – 4 June 1943
- Preceded by: Carlos Noel
- Succeeded by: Ricardo Guardo

National Deputy
- In office 25 April 1936 – 4 June 1943
- Constituency: Federal Capital

Mayor of Buenos Aires
- In office 15 November 1928 – 6 September 1930
- President: Hipólito Yrigoyen
- Preceded by: Adrián Fernández Casco
- Succeeded by: José Guerrico
- In office 5 December 1919 – 25 October 1921
- President: Hipólito Yrigoyen
- Preceded by: Saturnino García Anido
- Succeeded by: Juan Bartneche

Governor of Buenos Aires
- In office 1 May 1922 – 1 May 1926
- Vice Governor: Pedro Solanet
- Preceded by: Luis Monteverde
- Succeeded by: Valentín Vergara

Personal details
- Born: 6 February 1871 Buenos Aires, Argentina
- Died: 11 October 1944 (aged 73) Buenos Aires, Argentina
- Party: Radical Civic Union

José Luis Cantilo (6 February 1871 – 11 October 1944) was an Argentine diplomat and politician of the Radical Civic Union. He served both as intendente (mayor) of the City of Buenos Aires and as governor of Buenos Aires Province during the 1920s. From 1936 to 1941, he also served as a National Deputy and as President of the Chamber of Deputies.

== Early and personal life ==
Cantilo was born on 6 February 1871 in Buenos Aires, son of José María Raimundo Cantilo Muñoz and Magdalena Ortiz Basualdo Quesada. In 1897, he married Josefina Alejandra Achával Rufino, with whom he had seven children: Rosa, Magdalena, Esther, Teresa, Rafael, José Luis, and Héctor. José Luis (the younger) would also become involved in politics, and served as Minister of Defense in the caretaker administration of José María Guido.

== Career ==
A close friend of Hipólito Yrigoyen, Cantilo was part of Yrigoyen's clique and formed part of the Civic Union, later becoming a founding member of the Radical Civic Union (UCR) in 1891. He participated in the 1893 Revolution and the 1905 Revolution. In 1895, he was elected to the Buenos Aires Province Chamber of Deputies.

In 1916, he founded La Época, a propagandist newspaper supporting the newly elected government of Yrigoyen.

In 1917, Yrigoyen appointed Cantilo as federal interventor of Buenos Aires Province, until then governed by the conservative Marcelino Ugarte, a political opponent of Yrigoyen's. By 1918, Cantilo's administration had further intervened 44 municipalities, withholding fiscal taxes from them: the provincial government was no longer paying for hospital and police services in a number of localities, and police services had been suspended completely.

In 1919, Yrigoyen appointed Cantilo as intendente (mayor) of the City of Buenos Aires. During Cantilo's mayorship, Buenos Aires held celebrations in commemoration of the centennial of Manuel Belgrano's passing. Cantilo frontlined the events alongside José Tamborini at Teatro Belgrano, located in the homonymous Belgrano barrio. His term as mayor also saw the creation of the Barrio Cafferata, an unofficial working-class barrio in Parque Chacabuco.

In 1922, he was elected Governor of Buenos Aires Province in his own right. As governor, he mandated the establishment of the Organización Deportiva de la Provincia, the province's first sports organisation. His governorship also saw the provincial telegraph company declaring bankruptcy.

Cantilo was elected to the National Chamber of Deputies in 1936, having run for a seat in the Federal Capital. He was elected as the Chamber's president in 1940, and held the position until the 1943 coup shut Congress down. Cantilo died the following year, on 11 October 1944.

Political offices
Preceded by Marcelino Ugarte as Governor	Federal Interventor of Buenos Aires Province; 1916–1918	Succeeded by José Camilo Crotto as Governor
Preceded by Saturnino García Anido	Mayor of Buenos Aires; 1919–1921	Succeeded by Juan Bartneche
Preceded by Luis Monteverde	Governor of Buenos Aires Province; 1928–1930	Succeeded by Valentín Vergara
Preceded by Adrián Fernández Casco	Mayor of Buenos Aires; 1928–1930	Succeeded by José Guerrico
Preceded by Carlos Noel	President of the Chamber of Deputies; 1941–1943	Vacant 1943 coup d'état Title next held by Ricardo Guardo
