= José Camilo Crotto =

Argentine politician

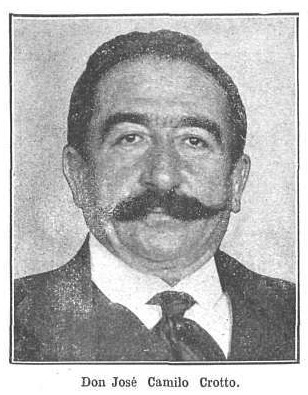

Governor of Buenos Aires
- In office 1 May 1918 – 1 May 1921
- Vice Governor: Luis Monteverde
- Preceded by: José Luis Cantilo (Interventor)
- Succeeded by: Luis Monteverde

National Senator
- In office 1912–1918
- Constituency: Federal Capital

Personal details
- Born: 26 May 1863 Dolores, Buenos Aires, Argentina
- Died: 1936 (aged 72–73) Buenos Aires, Argentina
- Resting place: La Recoleta Cemetery
- Party: Radical Civic Union
- Spouse: Eva Ángela Mazzini.
- Occupation: Politician
- Profession: Legal

José Camilo Crotto (1863–1936) was an Argentine politician, founder member of the Radical Civic Union. He served as national Senator and was Governor of Buenos Aires Province between 1918 and 1921.

== Early life ==
José Camilo was born Dolores, son of Giuseppe Crotto and Valeria Villas, belonging to a family of French-Italian roots. He received his primary education in his hometown. Later in 1873, Crotto became a pupil at San Jose school, where he completed his secondary education.

== Education ==
Crotto obtained his law degree at the University of Buenos Aires in 1888.

== Political career ==
José Camilo Crotto was involved in the military civic uprisings, organized by the Civic Union. In 1890, he participated in the Revolution of the Park, and 15 years later in the Revolution of 1905. Between 1909 and 1918, Crotto was president of the Unión Cívica Radical. In 1912, he was elected national senator, and on 1 May 1918 Crotto assumed the government of the province. He resigned in 1921, due to disagreements with Hipólito Yrigoyen.

Political offices
Preceded by José Luis Cantilo as Federal Interventor	Governor of Buenos Aires Province; 1918–1921	Succeeded by Luis Monteverde
