= Zelmar Casco =

Argentine fencer (1926–2020)

Personal information
- Born: 31 July 1926 La Plata, Argentina
- Died: 5 September 2020 (aged 94)

Sport
- Sport: Fencing

Zelmar Roberto Casco (31 July 1926 – 5 September 2020) was an Argentine fencer. He competed in the individual and team épée events at the 1964 Summer Olympics. His uncle was fellow fencer Horacio Casco.

Casco died from COVID-19 in 2020.
