= Ricardo Guardo =

Argentine politician (1908–1984)

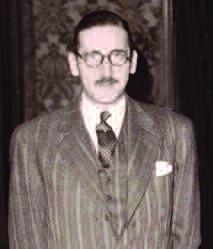
- Guardo in 1947

Minister of Defense
- In office 22 January 1976 – 4 March 1976
- President: Isabel Perón
- Preceded by: Tomás Vottero
- Succeeded by: José Deheza

Ambassador of Argentina to the Holy See
- In office 1974 – 22 January 1976
- Preceded by: Santiago Alberto de Estrada
- Succeeded by: Antonio Cafiero

President of the Chamber of Deputies
- In office 26 April 1946 – 26 April 1948
- Preceded by: José Luis Cantilo
- Succeeded by: Héctor Cámpora

National Deputy
- In office 29 April 1946 – 30 April 1952
- Constituency: Federal Capital

Personal details
- Born: 21 October 1908 Buenos Aires, Argentina
- Died: 1984 (aged 75–76) Buenos Aires, Argentina
- Party: Justicialist Party

Ricardo César Guardo (21 October 1908 – 1984) was an Argentine dentist and politician. He served as a National Deputy elected in Buenos Aires from 1946 to 1952, and as President of the Chamber of Deputies from 1946 to 1948. A member of the peronist Justicialist Party, he also briefly served as Minister of Defense during the presidency of Isabel Perón in 1976 and as Argentina's ambassador to the Holy See from 1974 to 1976.

== Early life and career ==
Guardo was born on 21 October 1908 in Buenos Aires, son of Antonio Juan Guardo, a dentist by profession, and María Victoria Lértora. He followed his father's footsteps in becoming a dentist, and earned a dentistry degree in 1929. He would later earn a general medicine degree from the National University of La Plata (UNLP) in 1942. As a student, he was a frequent collaborator of the Círculo Odontológico Argentino journal, and served as director of the Prótesis journal.

In 1945, he was elected as the Dentistry School representative before the UNLP Faculty of Medicinal Sciences Directive Council, in representation of the school's professors. In addition to his practice, Guardo also worked as the dentistry inspector of the medical school corps, director of the Colegio de Odontólogos, and president of the Sociedad Argentina de Cirugía Dentomaxilofacial.

== Political career ==
Although not an early supporter of the Peronist movement, Guardo decided to become involved in politics after meeting General Juan Perón in person in 1945. Upon Perón's request, Guardo founded the Centro Universitario Argentino, a university students' organisation aimed at grouping students into the movement. It was inaugurated on 5 December 1945, with an attendance of over 300 young students from all over Argentina, and counted with Perón's presence.

Guardo was later elected to the National Chamber of Deputies in the 1946 legislative election for Buenos Aires. During his time as a member of Congress, Guardo's main concerns were education and health. He co-authored Law 13.031, which mandated the creation of the Faculty of Dentistry at the University of Buenos Aires. From 1946 to 1948, he was president of the Chamber. As president, Guardo had all of Perón's speeches and public interventions compiled into a single book and printed at the Congress press, which he later gifted to the General.

Following the 1955 coup d'état that overthrew Perón and established a military dictatorship, Guardo and his family went into exile, finding refuge at the Argentine embassy in Haiti. While in exile, Guardo wrote Horas difíciles, reminiscing on the history of Peronism and its downfall.

In 1973, with the end of Perón's exile and his re-election as president, Guardo returned to Argentina and was appointed ambassador to the Holy See. Later, upon Perón's death and Isabel Perón's ascent to the presidency, Guardo became Minister of Defense on 22 January 1976, but resigned less than two months later on 4 March, 20 days before the military launched another coup, once again overthrowing the democratically elected peronist government and establishing a military dictatorship.

== Personal life ==
He was married to Lillian Lagomarsino, an heiress and protocol instructor who was Eva Perón's escort and confidant during her 1947 European tour. Guardo and Lagomarsino had four children: Lilian, Marta, Graciela and Ricardo. He died in 1984, aged 76.

In 2012, the Municipal Dentistry Hospital in Tigre, Buenos Aires, was named "Dr. Ricardo Guardo" in his honour.

Political offices
Vacant 1943 Revolution Title last held by José Luis Cantilo	President of the Chamber of Deputies; 1946–1948	Succeeded by Héctor Cámpora
Preceded by Tomás Vottero	Minister of Defense; 1976	Succeeded by José Deheza
