= Museo de Arte Hispanoamericano Isaac Fernández Blanco =

Art museum in Buenos Aires, Argentina

Coordinates: 34°35′28″S 58°22′49″W

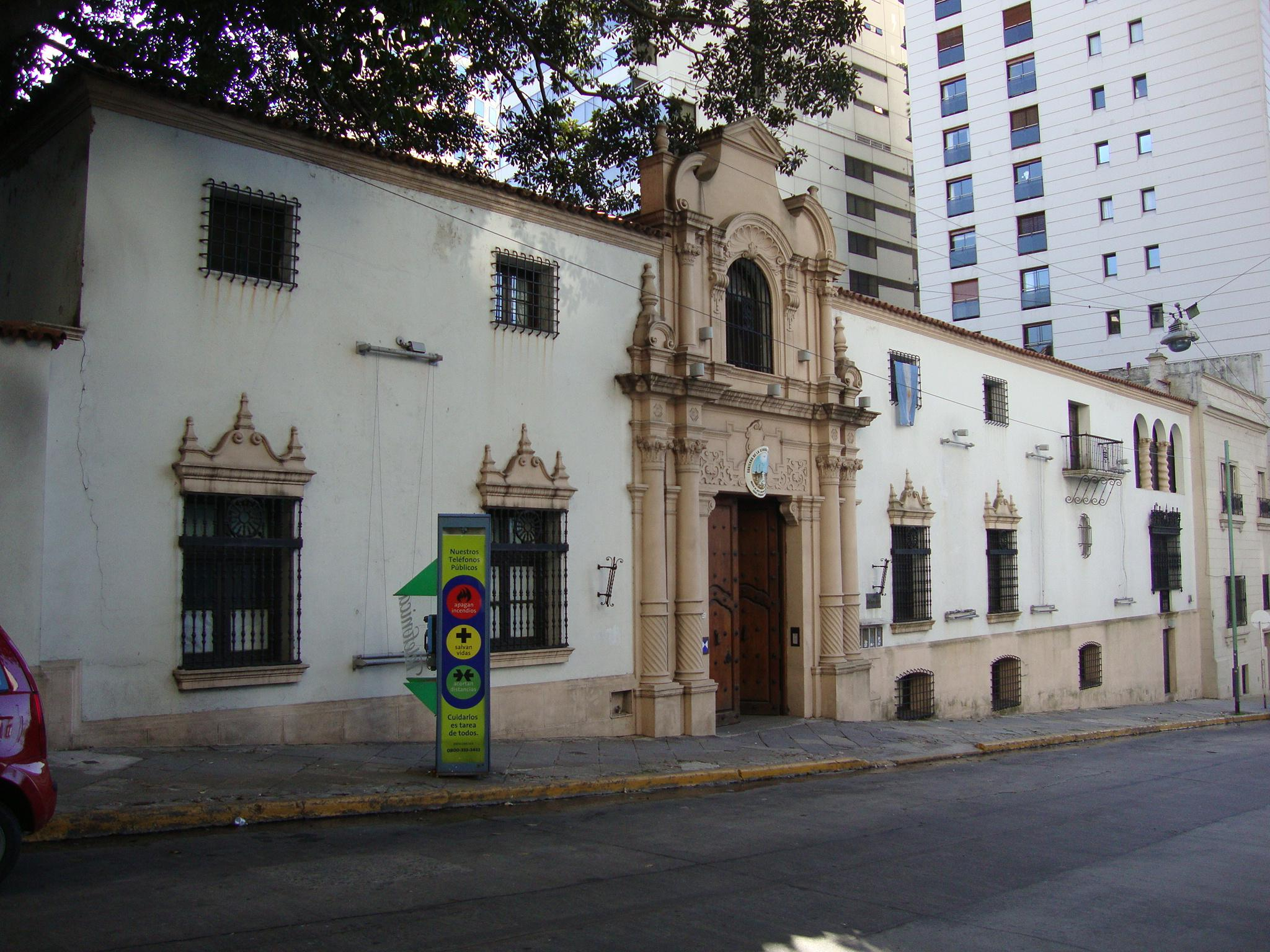
- Established: May 25, 1922
- Location: 1422 Suipacha Street; Buenos Aires, Argentina
- Director: Jorge Cometti.
- Website: museos.buenosaires.gov.ar

The Museo de Arte Hispanoamericano Isaac Fernández Blanco is a museum of art located in the Retiro ward of Buenos Aires, Argentina.

== Overview ==
The museum originated with an extensive collection of Spanish art and Latin American art (particularly of the Cuzco School) amassed by Isaac Fernández Blanco from 1882 onwards. Fernández Blanco was an engineer by vocation; but he was also very fond of the violin, and the family fortune let him had an important collection of string instruments. Later on, he extended his interest to objects of Spanish American culture: silverware, religious icons, paintings, furniture, books, and documents. The Fernández Blanco patrimony, which totals nearly 10,000 works, is considered one of the most important in Spanish American art, mostly in art and silverware from Peru. His Peruvian art collection features extensive silverware and fine arts, the latter including numerous original works from the Cuzco School of the colonial period. Other collections include works from the Río de la Plata basin, Jesuit and Quito iconography, Brazilian furniture, and decorative arts from both colonial Latin America and Spain.

Among the museum's peculiarities is a collection of hand fans, tortoiseshell or horn ornamental combs used by women during the days of the Viceroyalty of the Río de la Plata and of the subsequent Argentine Confederation (in the first half of the 19th century).

The museum was originally opened in the family's home near Congressional Plaza in 1921, and his youngest daughter, Naïr, served as its first guide. Fernández Blanco sold the property and museum to the City of Buenos Aires the following year, however, and on May 25, 1922, it was re-inaugurated as the Museo de Arte Colonial. The founder remained at the helm of the museum until 1926, and continued to serve as curator on an ad honorem basis until his death in 1928. His son-in-law and fellow connoisseur of Hispanic art, Dr. Alberto Gowland, continued to add to its collections, and in 1943, the city bequeathed to the museum an eclectic Baroque mansion acquired from Martín Noel seven years earlier.

Noel, a French Argentine architect graduate of the École Spéciale d'Architecture, designed the mansion following his return to Argentina in 1914, and its construction was completed in 1922. He shared the residence with his brother, Dr. Carlos Noel (who served as mayor of Buenos Aires), and graced the property with an Andalusian patio. Sold to the city in 1936, the mansion became the home of the Colonial Art Museum in 1947, and it was renamed in its founder's honor at that time.

Its patrimony was further enriched with donations from Celina González Garaño in 1963 (mostly silverware and paintings) and from her brother Alfredo in 1972. Other significant contributions included collections bequeathed by Ricardo Braun Menéndez (1967), Fiat Concord (1970), Pedro San Martín (1975), Max von Buch (1978), Mario Hirsch (1983), María Alcorta de Waldorp (1997), the Angli family (2002), and from the estates of Mabel and María Castellano Fotheringham.

The Chief Curator of the Louvre, Marie-Catherine Sahut, visited the museum in November 2009, and subsequently helped establish a joint studies committee with the renowned French institution.

== Gallery ==
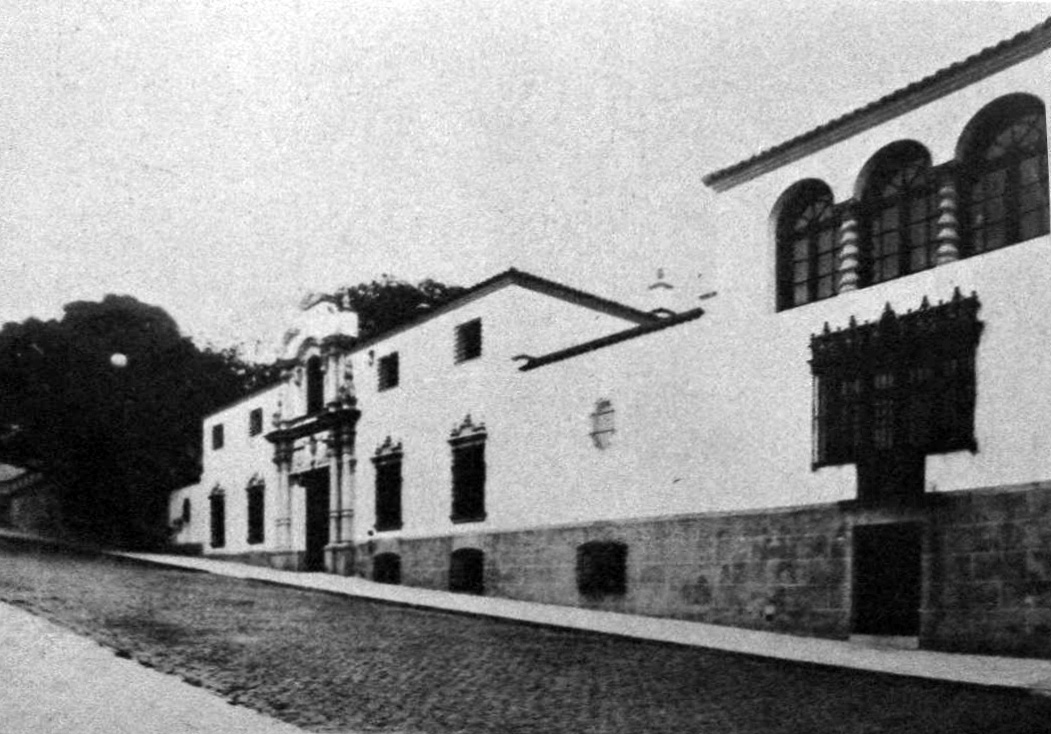

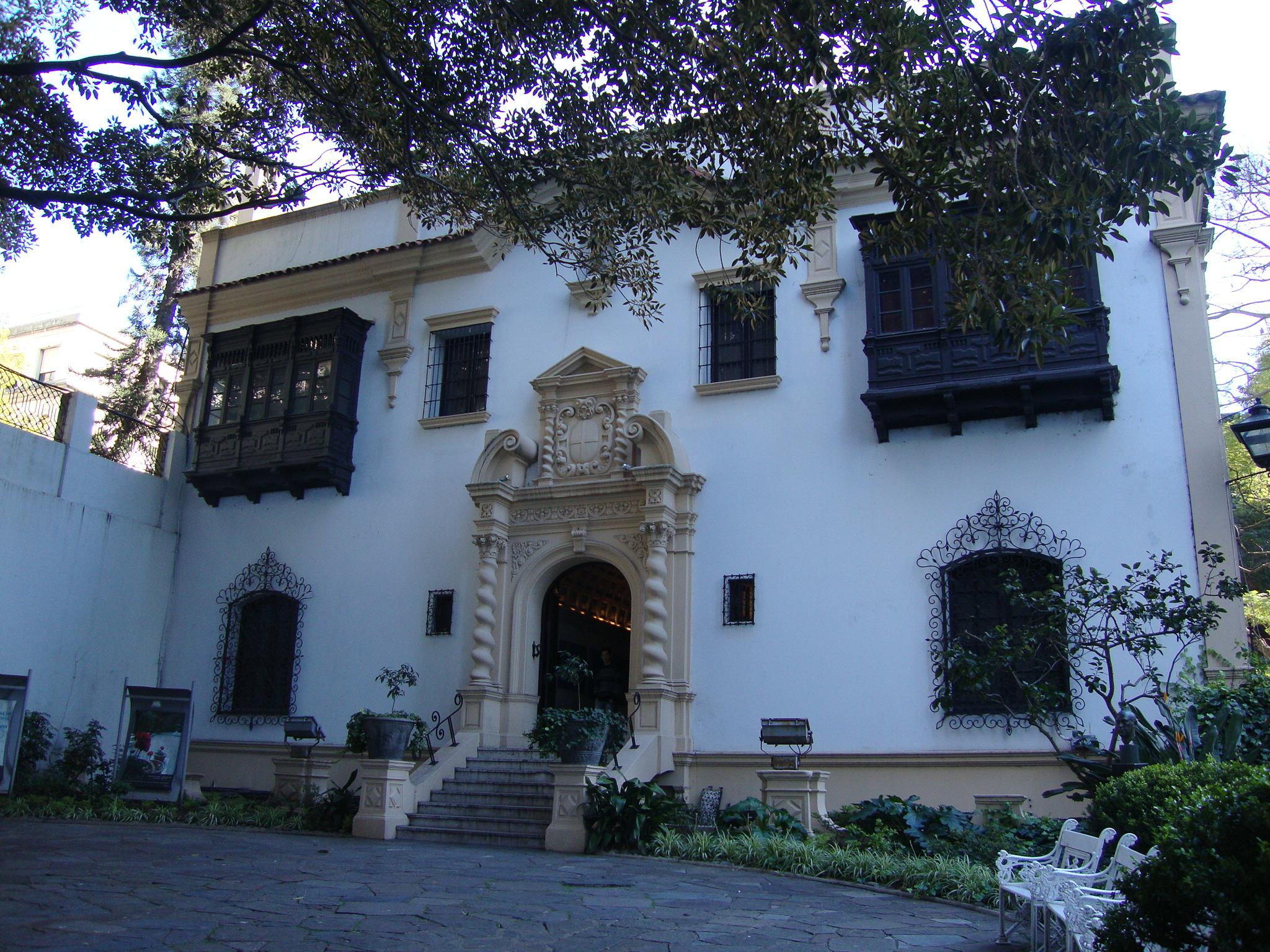

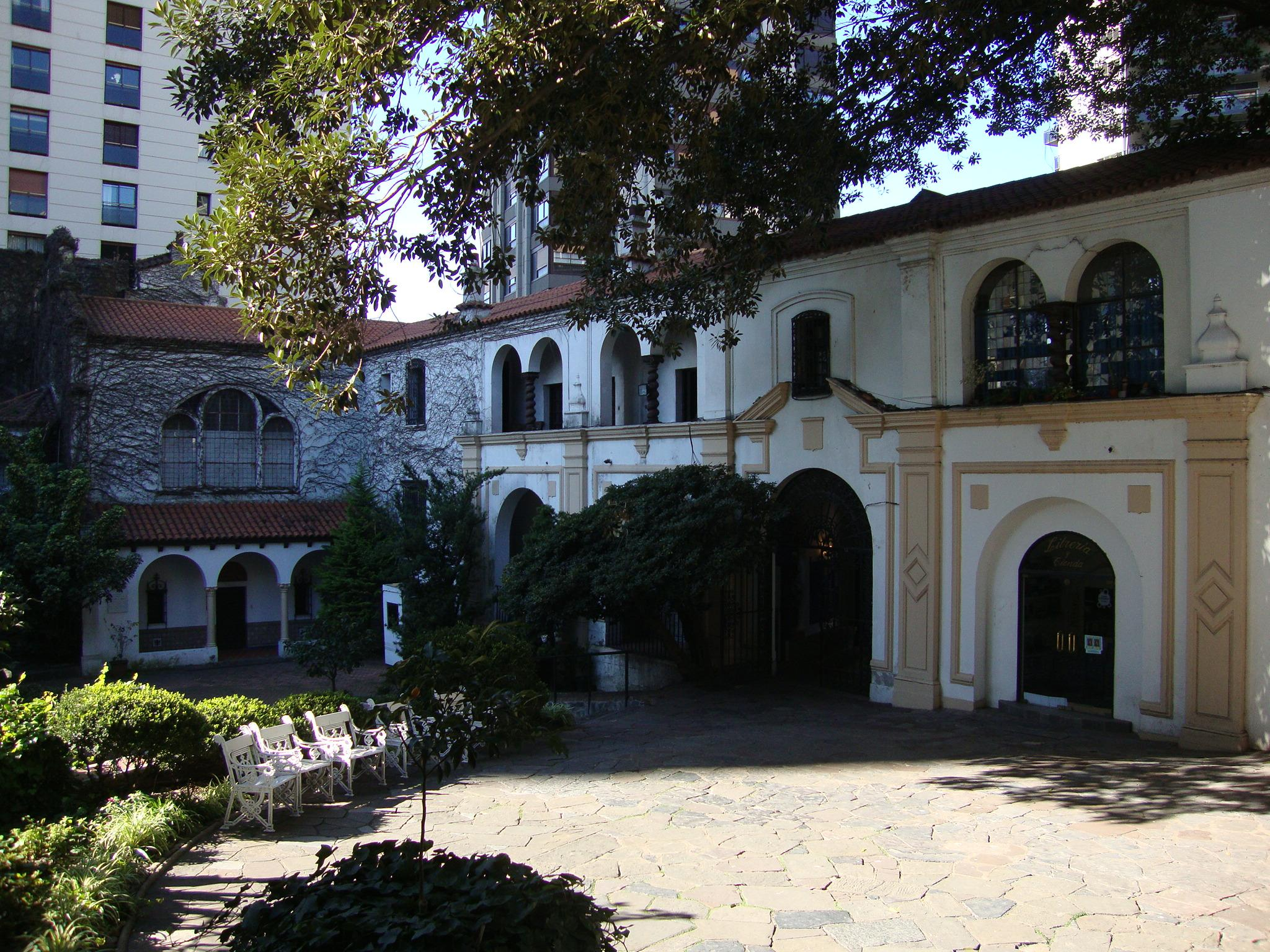
