= 1936 Argentine legislative election =

- 1 March 1936
- 83 of the 158 seats in the Chamber of Deputies
- Turnout: 70.84%
Party	Vote %	Seats	+/–
Radical Civic Union	44.06	39	New
Concordancia	37.59	36	−9
Socialist Party	9.21	5	−17
Tucumán Radical Civic Union	2.01	3	New
This lists parties that won seats. See the complete results below.
Results by province

Legislative elections were held in Argentina on 1 March 1936. The National Democratic Party remained the largest faction, with 55 of the 158 seats, despite receiving far fewer votes than the Radical Civic Union. Voter turnout was 70.9%.

== Results ==
Party or alliance		Votes	%	Seats	
Party or alliance		Votes	%	Won	Total
Radical Civic Union		720,009	44.06	39	42
Concordancia	National Democratic Party	370,315	22.66	25	58
Concordancia	Santa Fe Radical Civic Union	82,625	5.06	3	6
Concordancia	Concordancia	70,241	4.30	4	1
Concordancia	Unified Radical Civic Union	43,615	2.67	2	4
Concordancia	Liberal Party of Corrientes	17,043	1.04	1	2
Concordancia	Independent Socialist Party	12,073	0.74	0	2
Concordancia	People's Party	11,171	0.68	1	2
Concordancia	Antipersonalist Radical Civic Union	7,142	0.44	0	4
Concordancia	Total	614,225	37.59	36	79
Socialist Party		150,442	9.21	5	25
Democratic Progressive Party		80,542	4.93	0	6
Tucumán Radical Civic Union		32,903	2.01	3	5
Radical Party		10,987	0.67	0	0
Federalist Radical Civic Union		6,919	0.42	0	1
Public Health Party		5,387	0.33	0	0
San Luis Radical Civic Union		4,063	0.25	0	0
Popular Party		2,775	0.17	0	0
National Democratic Party (Renewal Center)		2,719	0.17	0	0
National Labor Party		1,681	0.10	0	0
Labor Party		934	0.06	0	0
Argentine Integralist Party		267	0.02	0	0
Others		186	0.01	0	0
Total		1,634,039	100.00	83	158
Valid votes		1,634,039	94.89		
Invalid/blank votes		88,080	5.11		
Total votes		1,722,119	100.00		
Registered voters/turnout		2,431,129	70.84		
Source: Cantón

=== Results by province ===
Province	UCR			Concordance			PS			Others		
Province	Votes	%	Seats	Votes	%	Seats	Votes	%	Seats	Votes	%	Seats
Buenos Aires	190,698	41.75	7	239,292	52.39	16	26,456	5.79	0	318	0.07	0
Buenos Aires City	187,100	57.43	11	12,073	3.71	0	103,106	31.65	5	23,529	7.22	0
Córdoba	106,384	64.01	7	54,166	32.59	3	5,653	3.40	0	—	—	—
Corrientes	16,613	22.62	0	56,841	77.38	4	—	—	—	5	0.01	0
Entre Ríos	62,211	56.65	4	41,984	38.23	2	4,696	4.28	0	934	0.85	0
Jujuy	—	—	—	11,171	100	1	—	—	—	—	—	—
Mendoza	18,122	30.81	1	28,294	48.11	2	5,464	9.29	0	6,936	11.79	0
San Luis	7,416	29.43	1	13,721	54.45	2	—	—	—	4,063	16.12	0
Santa Fe	91,086	35.81	7	82,625	32.48	3	—	—	—	80,675	31.71	0
Santiago del Estero	13,624	22.78	1	43,615	72.93	2	2,561	4.28	0	—	—	—
Tucumán	26,755	28.89	0	30,443	32.87	1	2,506	2.71	0	32,903	35.53	3
Total	720,009	44.06	39	614,225	37.59	36	150,442	9.21	5	149,363	9.14	3
