= Casino Central =

Casino in Mar del Plata, Argentina

Coordinates: 38°00′17″S 57°32′30″W

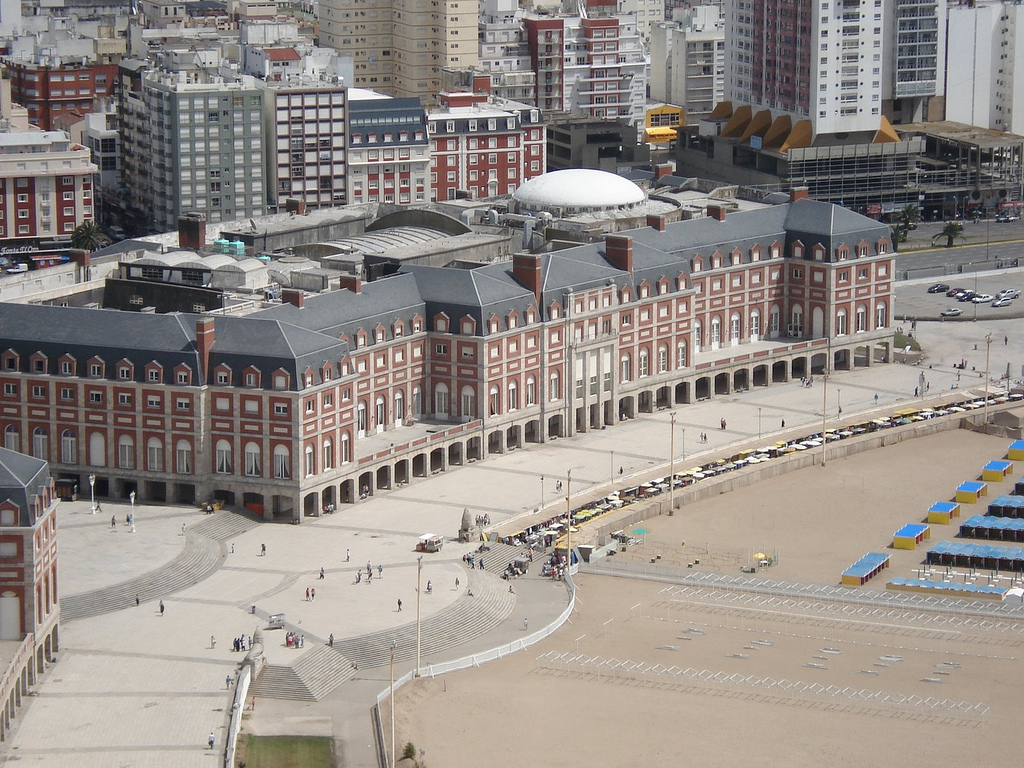
- Interactive map of Casino Central
- Location: Boulevard Marítimo 2148, Mar del Plata, Argentina
- Opened: December 22, 1939
- Theme: Biarritz
- No. of rooms: 66
- Gaming space: 7,000 m^{2} (75,000 sq ft)
- Signature attractions: Teatro Auditórium; Sala Ástor Piazzolla
- Casino type: Land
- Owner: Province of Buenos Aires Institute of Casinos and Lotteries (IPLyC)
- Architect: Alejandro Bustillo
- Renovated in: 2007
- Website: www.loteria.gba.gov.ar

The Casino Central ("Central Casino") is located in Mar del Plata, Argentina, and is one of the largest casinos in the country.

== Overview ==
The Central Casino is one of a pair of twin buildings designed by architect Alejandro Bustillo. Inspired by seafront Hôtel du Palais in Biarritz, France, the casino and neighboring Grand Provincial Hotel (inaugurated in 1950) remain architectural landmarks of the city of Mar del Plata as well as of Argentina. Its decoration was designed by famed French designer Jean-Michel Frank (who was in Argentina at work on the Llao Llao Hotel) together with local interior design house Casa Comte. Ground was broken on the casino's construction on July 15, 1938, by the Concordance Governor of Buenos Aires Province, Manuel Fresco, and the Central Casino was inaugurated on December 22, 1939.

Bustillo's twin buildings were designed in an eclectic style, but with reminiscences of French Neoclassical architecture. The buildings were clad in brick and quartzite, and topped with a slate mansard. Bustillo also designed the development's surrounding Bristol Esplanade, or Rambla Casino, and central square, both built from 1938 to 1941 for the casino and future hotel. Guillermo Brown Square separates the two twin buildings, and opens to the sea via wide stone steps flanked by two iconic statues of sea lions, carved by José Fioravanti.

The casino was refurbished by the provincial government in December 2007, and the Grand Provincial Hotel was reopened by Madrid-based NH Hotels in February 2009.

The grand entrance of the Central Casino, marked by a canopy, was located on Patricio Peralta Ramos Avenue, but was moved to the seashore esplanade following its 2007 refurbishment. Gaming space includes a main room overlooking the Atlantic Ocean, as well as rooms for high rollers (140 tables, including blackjack, baccarat, craps, and roulette) and for slot machines (630). The casino welcomes around 12,000 players per evening during the summer tourist season, with as many as 18,000 daily during January weekends.

The Central Casino shares the north building with a 66-room four star hotel, the Auditorium Theatre, the Ástor Piazzolla Room, a sports arena that hosted gymnastics tournaments and numerous other events at the 1995 Pan American Games, and the School of Hospitality. The ground floor also houses numerous storefronts and is surrounded by a portico along its beachfront side.
