= Alejandro Bustillo =

Argentine painter and architect

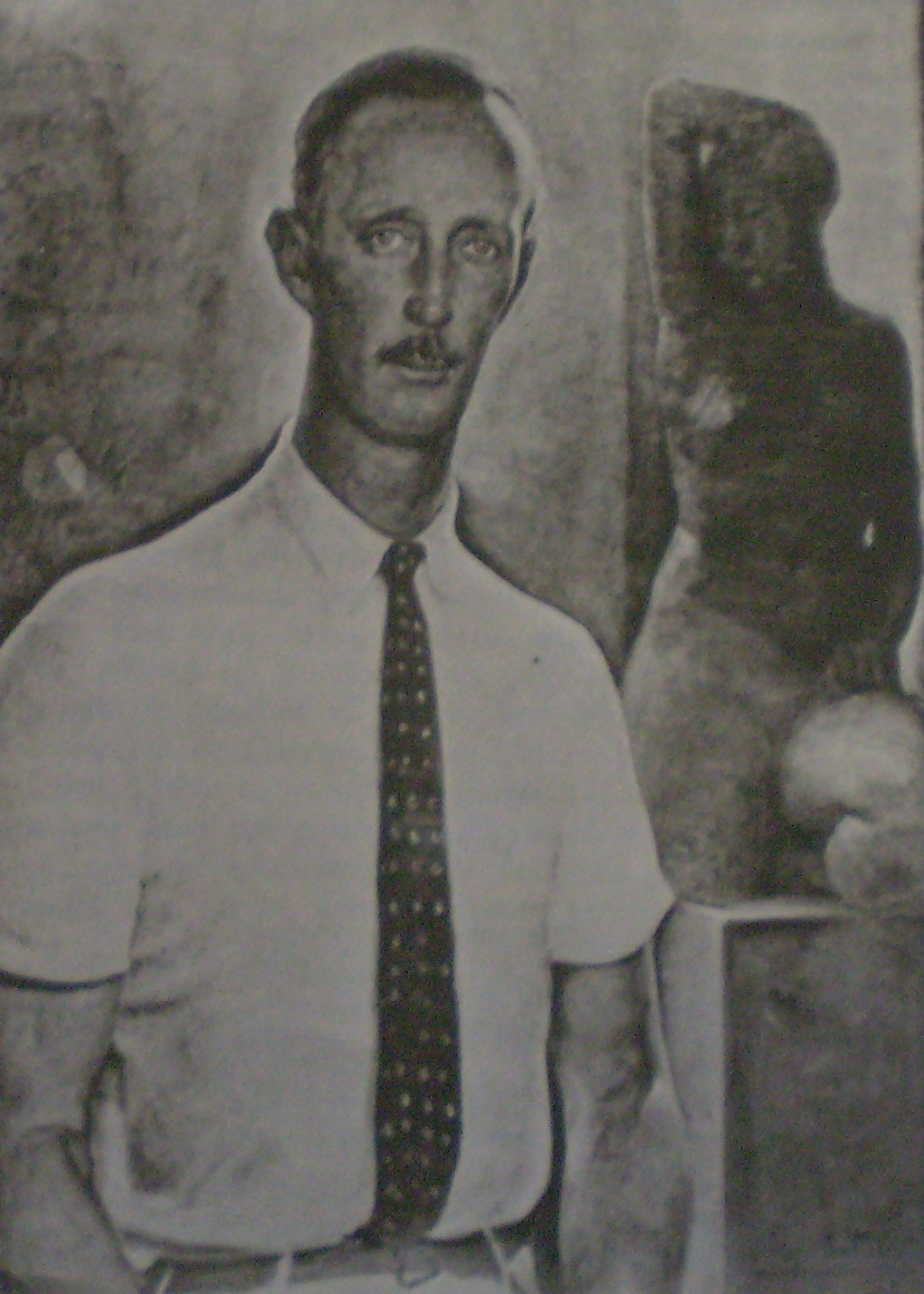
- Born: March 18, 1889; Buenos Aires, Argentina
- Died: November 13, 1982 (aged 93); Buenos Aires, Argentina
- Citizenship: Argentina
- Education: University of Buenos Aires
- Occupation: Architect
- Buildings: Llao Llao Hotel; Tornquist Building

Alejandro Bustillo (18 March 1889 – 3 November 1982) was an Argentine painter and architect who designed numerous buildings including iconic landmarks in Buenos Aires, Mar del Plata, and Bariloche.

== Biography ==
Born in Buenos Aires, son of María Luisa Madero and Dr. José María Bustillo, he completed his secondary school studies at Otto Krause Technical School. He later entered the School of Architecture at the University of Buenos Aires, where he also excelled as a painter, earning a first prize at the 1912 National Salon of Painters for a self-portrait. He graduated with a degree in Architecture in 1914.

He obtained his first professional experience working on the design of estancias, the first of which was for Santiago Rocca in 1916. He married Blanca Ayerza in 1917, and the couple had eight children. Bustillo designed a country house for his own family, Estancia La Primavera, in 1918. Two years later he returned to Buenos Aires. After a visit to Paris, Bustillo undertook two major projects for Carlos Tornquist in Buenos Aires, by designing the family's house (now the Belgium Embassy) in 1923, and the Tornquist Bank (today the Buenos Aires branch of Credit Lyonnais) in 1928.

From 1924 until 1937 he consolidated his career with a large number of works including commercial buildings, private houses and rental property. The Martínez de Hoz Building (1929) served as the Gran Hotel Argentino before its conversion into the Intelligence Secretariat. He undertook the remodel in 1931 of the interior of the Palais de Glace and in 1932 began the conversion of an old pumping station in Libertador Avenue, Buenos Aires, into the new headquarters for the Museo Nacional de Bellas Artes. He was contracted by the governor of Misiones Province in 1935 on the design of the governor's residence, San Martín Square, the municipal park, the police station and the surroundings of the Jesuit ruins of San Ignacio.

In 1938 he began some of his most important works by winning the competition for the design of the Llao Llao Hotel in San Carlos de Bariloche, an important tourist centre. The building, made almost entirely of wood, was destroyed by fire soon after its completion in 1939 and a year later Bustillo built a new hotel out of reinforced concrete and stone. In the Nahuel Huapi National Park, he designed Inalco on the shores of Nahuel Huapi Lake in the heart of the 'Seven Lakes Route' (Spanish: Ruta de los 7 lagos) northwest of Villa La Angostura, Neuquén, for Enrique García Merou. He designed the headquarters of the National Bank in Buenos Aires in both its phases, the first completed in 1944 and the second in 1955. Bustillo also designed numerous landmark works in Mar del Plata during the 1940s, including the Grand Provincial Hotel, the Casino, the seaside esplanade joining each, and City Hall.

Among Bustillo's best known later works was the National Flag Memorial in Rosario, designed in 1944 with fellow architect Ángel Guido and completed in 1957. His last works began in 1977 and he died in Buenos Aires in 1982 at the age of 93, having completed over 250 projects.

== Selected works ==
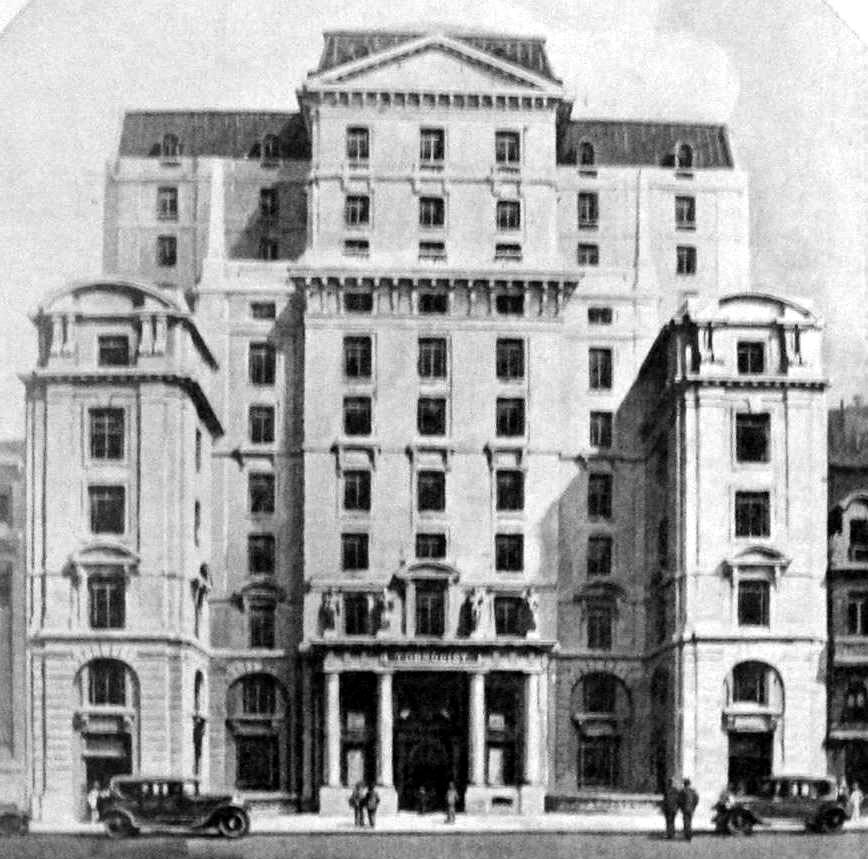
Tornquist Building (1925)

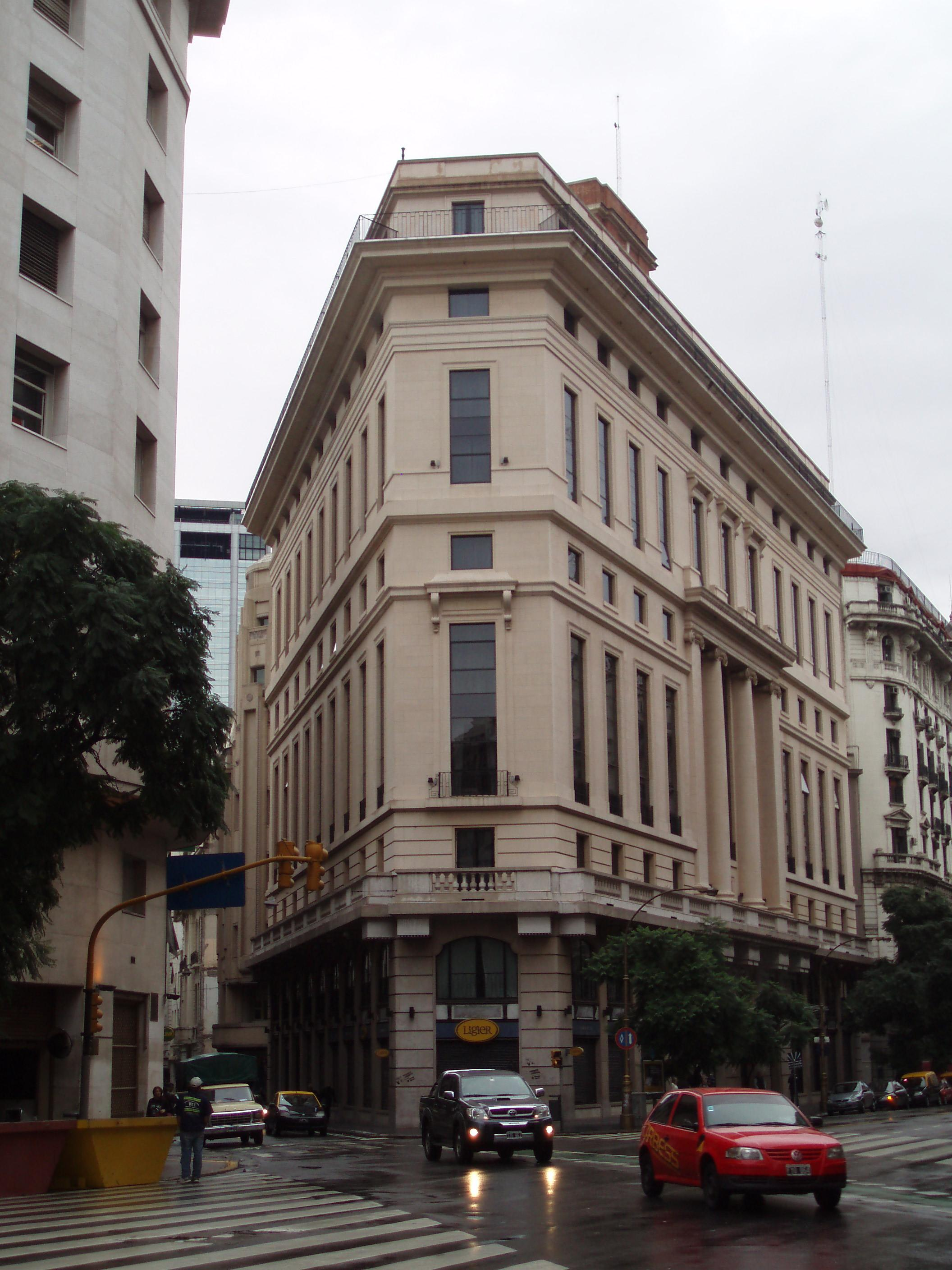
Hotel Continental (1927)

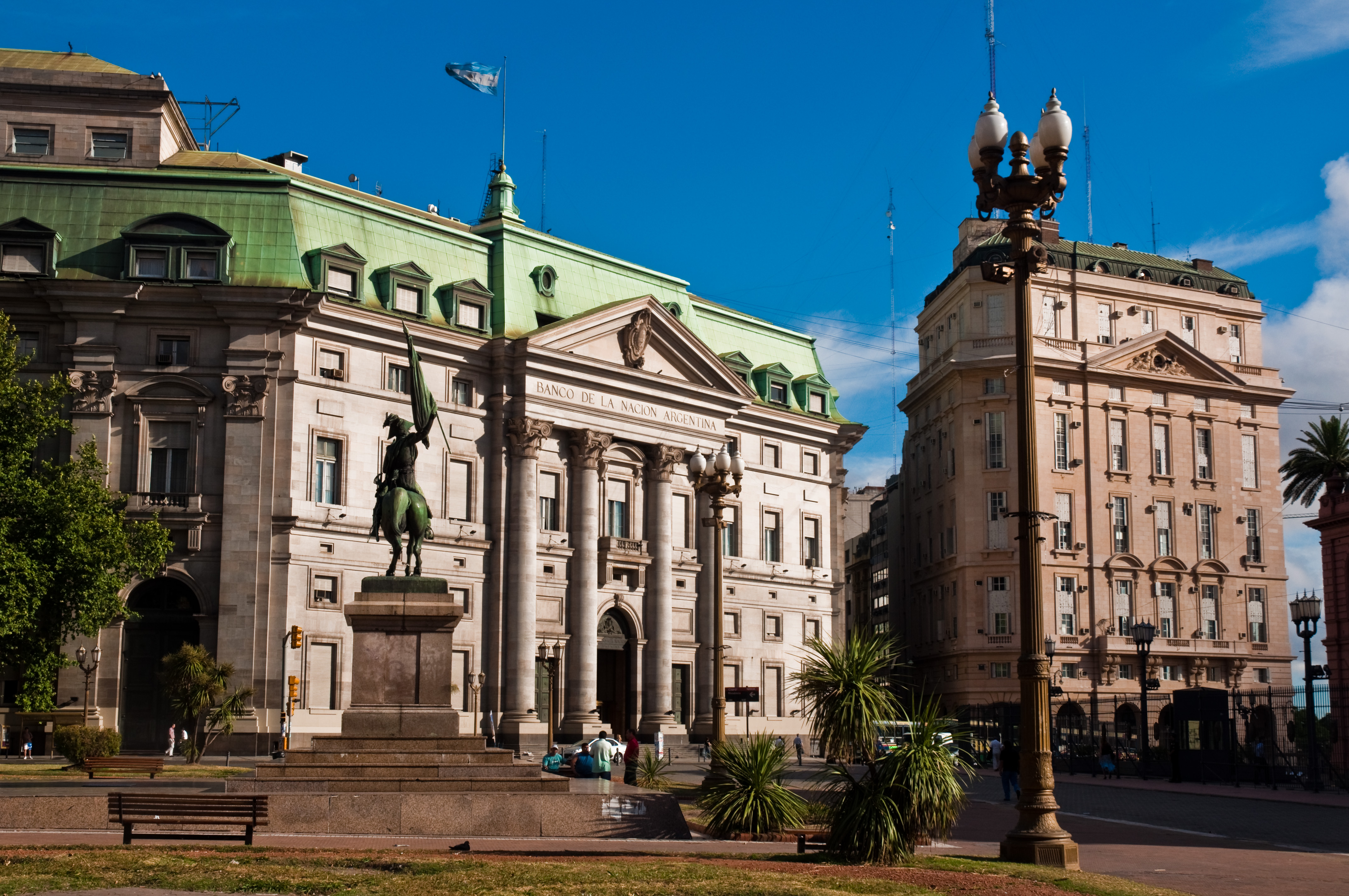
National Bank (1940) and Martínez de Hoz Building (1929)

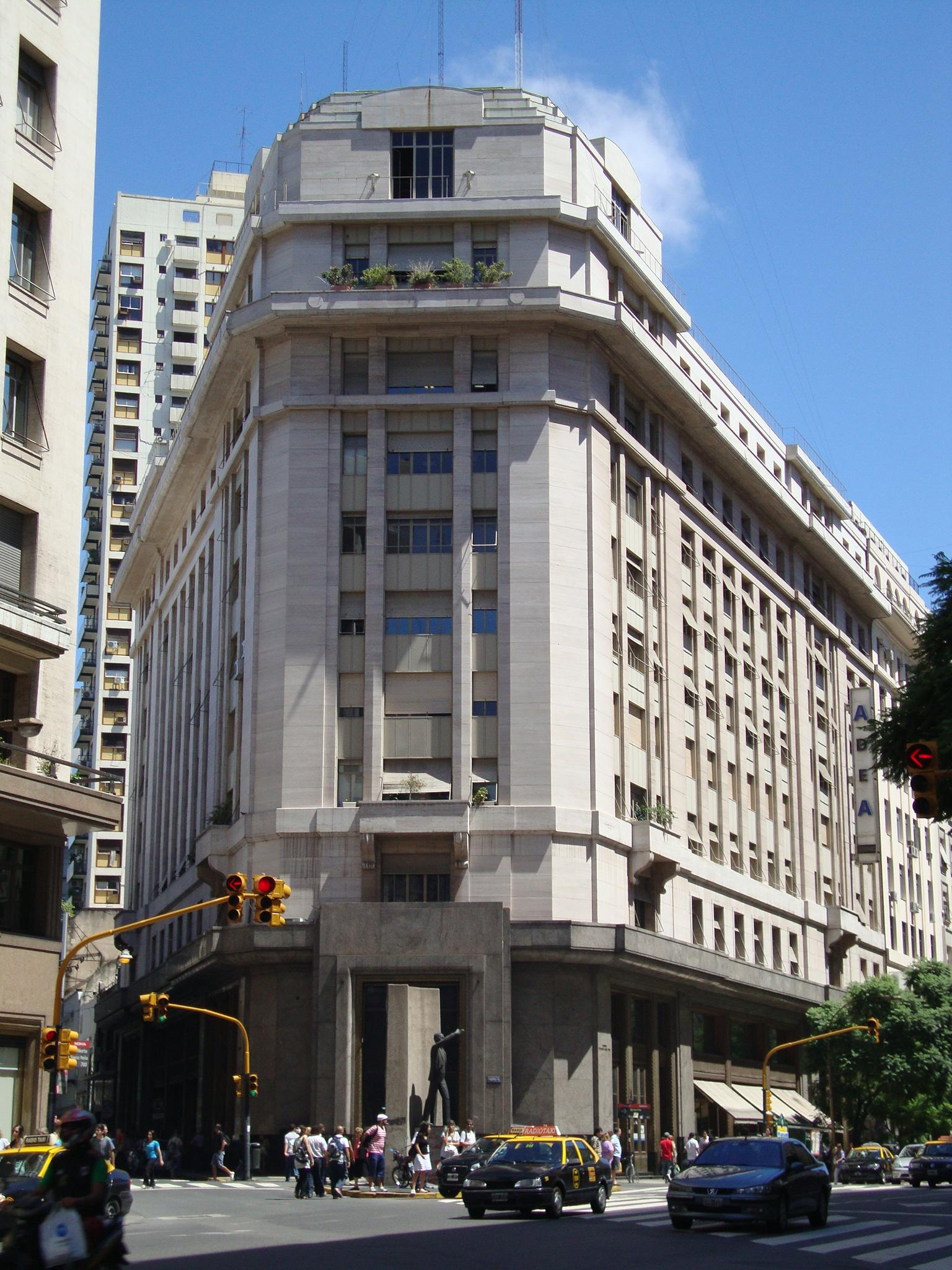
Volta Building (1930)

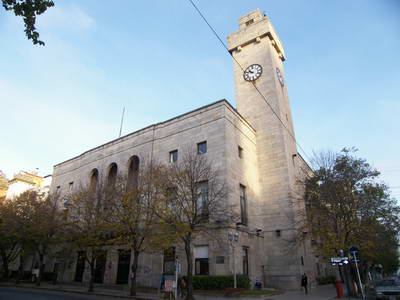
Mar del Plata City Hall (1938)

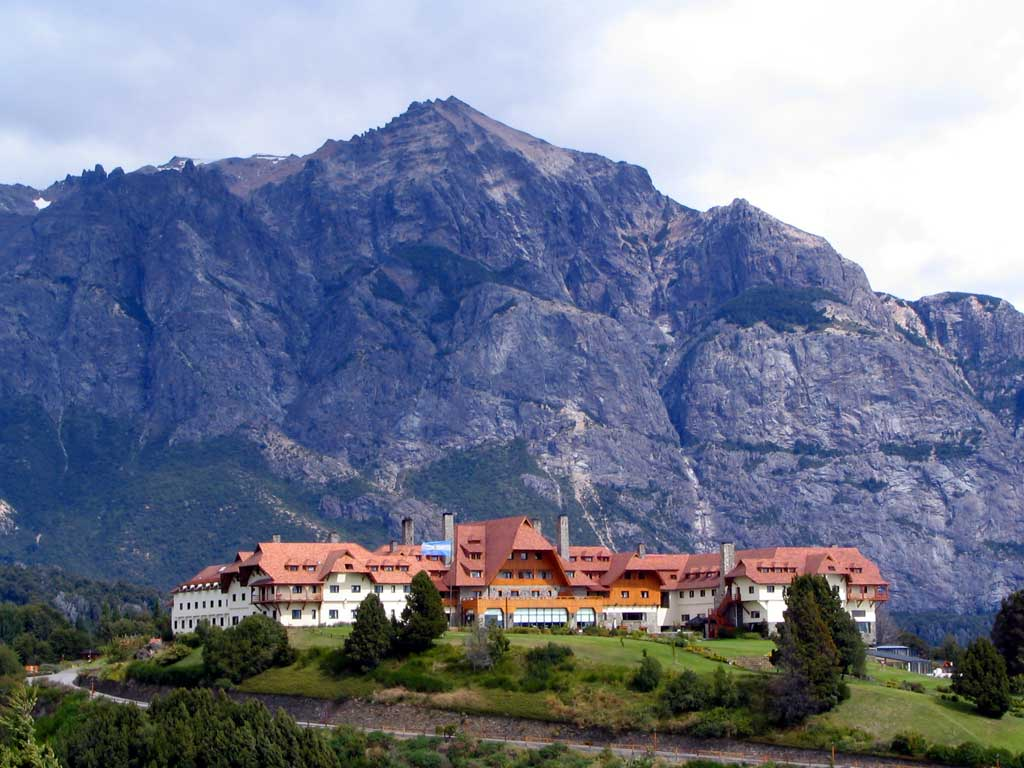
Hotel Llao Llao, Bariloche (1938)

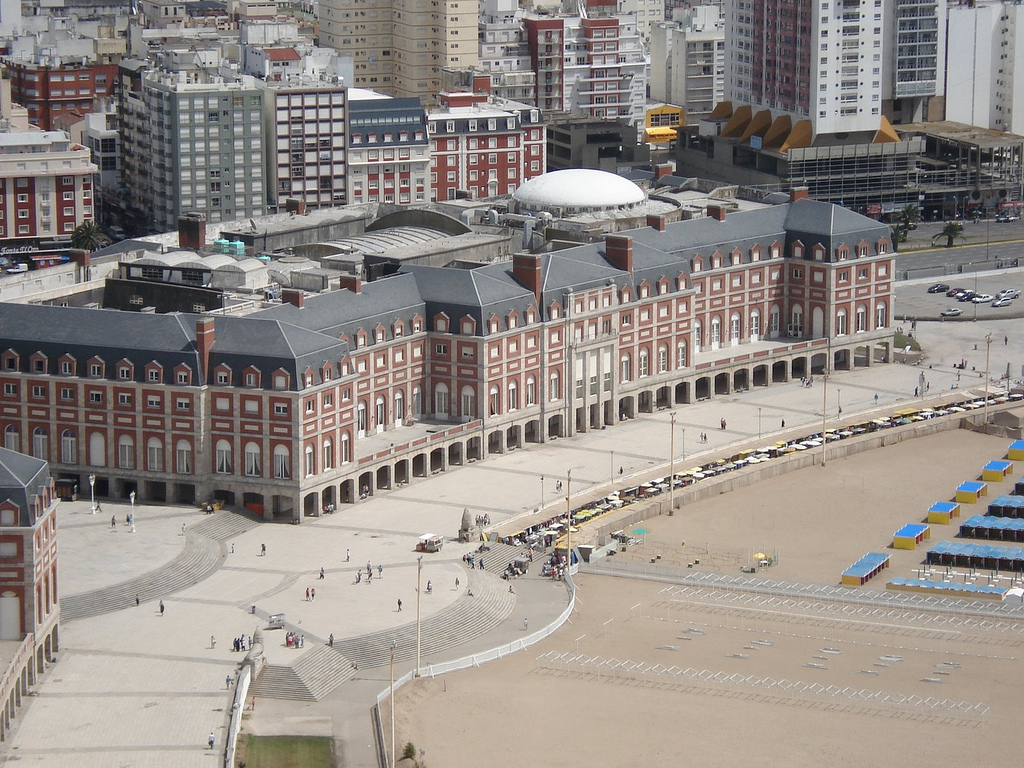
Central Casino and esplanade, Mar del Plata (1939)

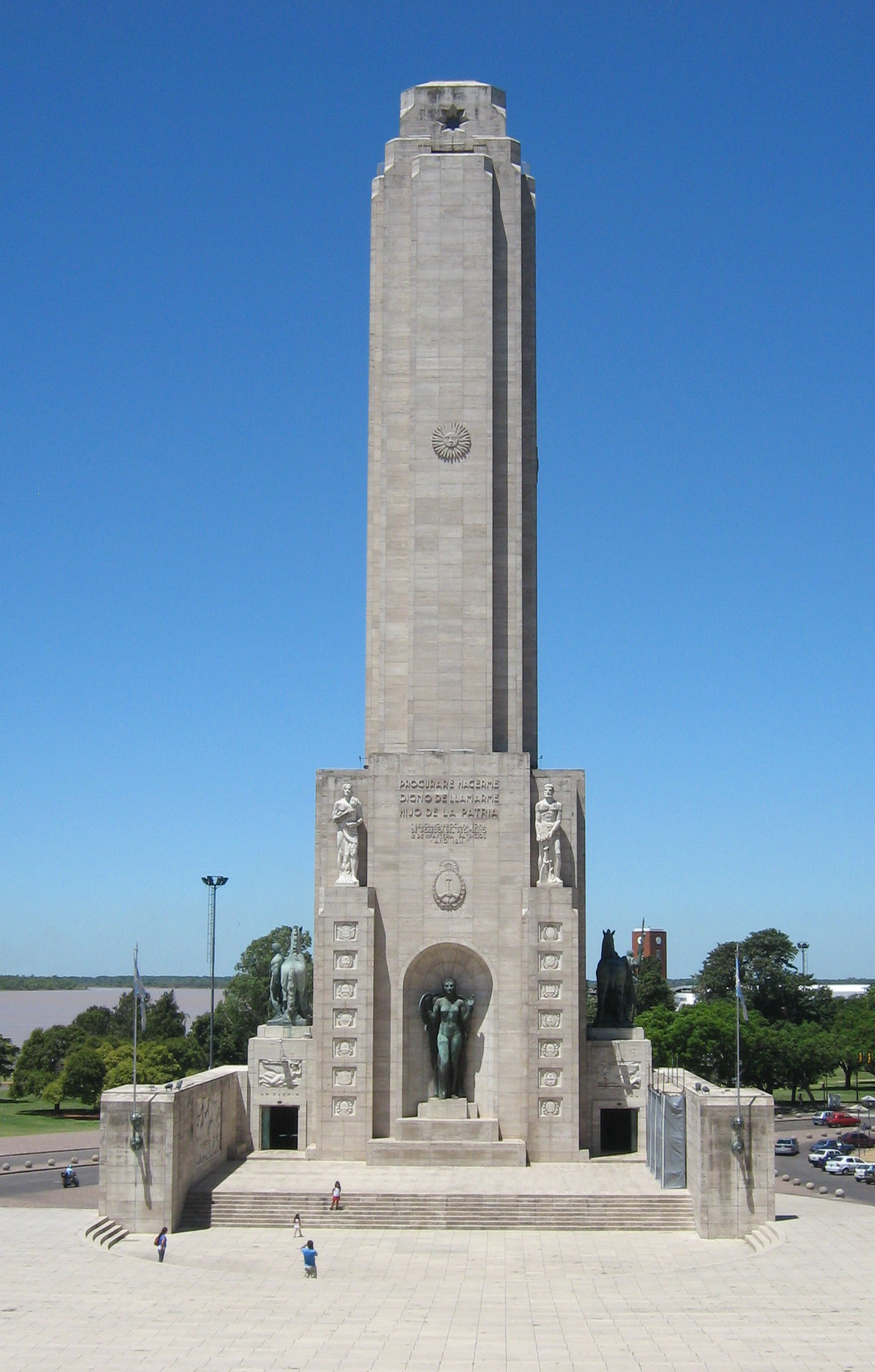
Monument to the Flag, Rosario (1944)

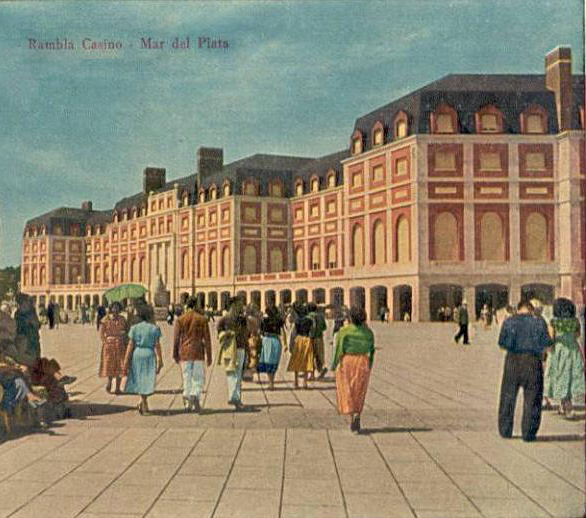
Grand Provincial Hotel, Mar del Plata (1946)

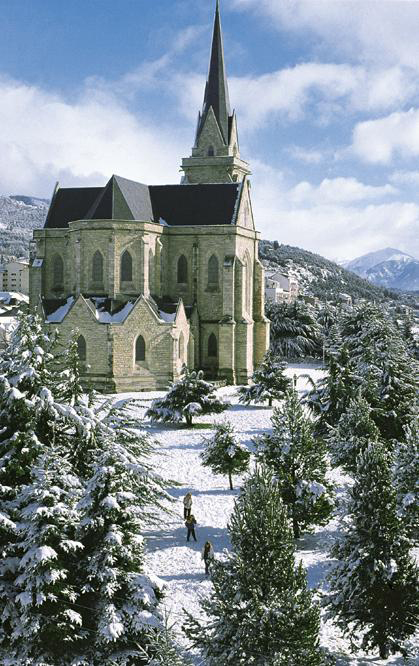
Cathedral of San Carlos de Bariloche (1946)

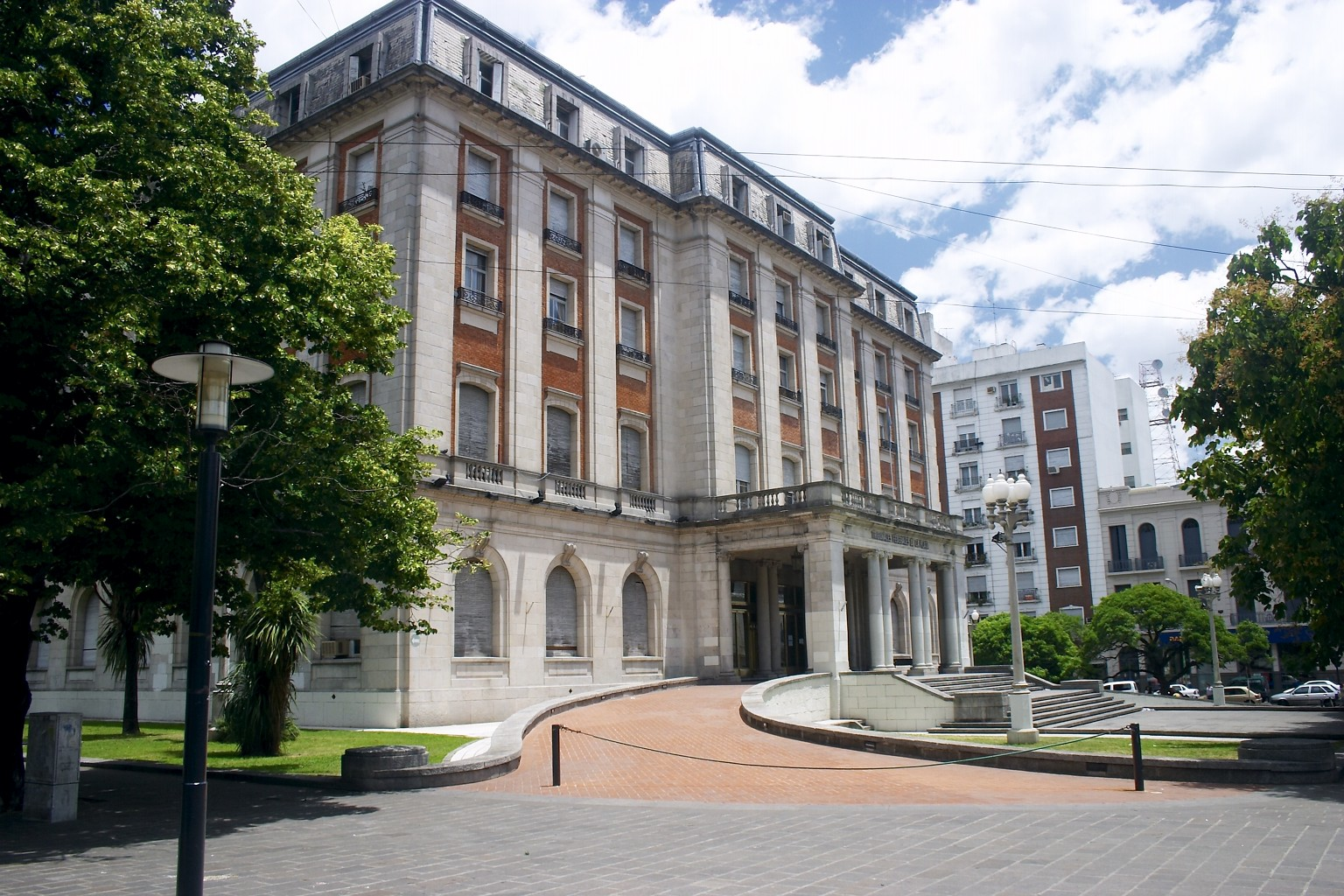
Hotel Provincial, La Plata (1948)
