= Palacio Edén =

Residential building in Mar del Plata, Argentina

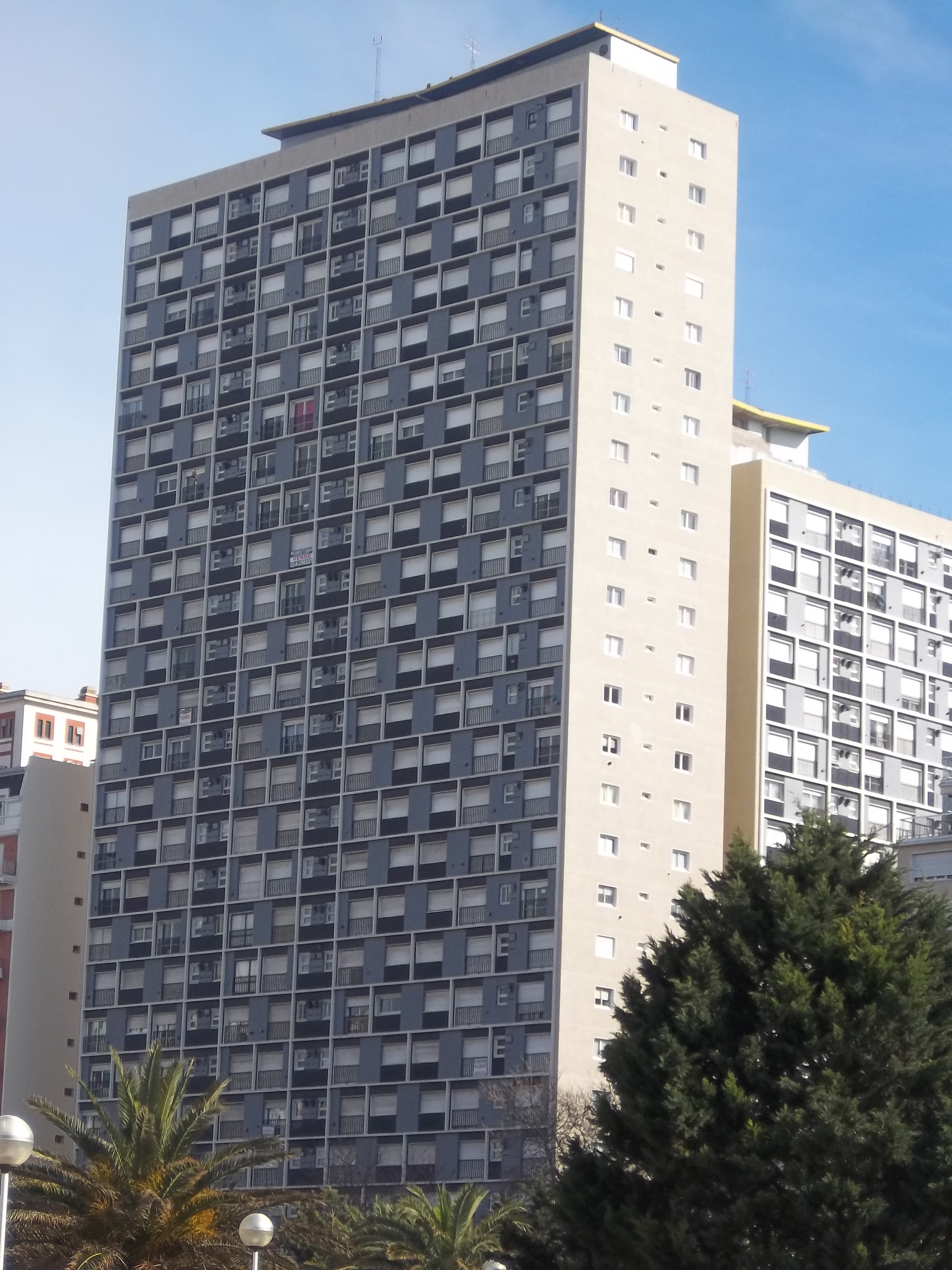
- Interactive map of the Palacio Edén area

General information
- Status: Completed
- Type: Apartments
- Location: Bolivar 2118; Mar del Plata, Argentina
- Coordinates: 38°00′19″S 57°32′42″W
- Construction started: 1958
- Completed: 1962

Height
- Height: 88 m (289 ft)

Technical details
- Floor count: 26

Design and construction
- Architecture firm: DELCO

Palacio Edén is an 88 m (289 ft)-tall, 26 story residential skyscraper located in Mar del Plata, Argentina. The building is located along the intersection of Calle Buenos Aires and Calle Bolívar. It is the seventh-tallest building in Mar del Plata.

== Size ==
Palacio Edén was constructed on an area of 2,300 m^{2} (25,000 sq ft) and has a surface area of around 20,000 m^{2} (220,000 sq ft). Each floor has a surface area of around 820 m^{2} (8,800 sq ft). The building has a height of 88 m (289 ft). The plan for the building consists of two L-shaped buildings raised above the ground, the tallest of which stands at 73 m (240 ft). The two buildings contain 275 apartment spaces. Palacio Edén is adjacent to the Plaza Colón, a park space near the Atlantic Ocean and the Casino Central.

== History ==
Construction of Palacio Edén began in mid-1958 and was led by Juan Antonio Dompé. The building was completed in 1962. Construction was overseen by the construction company DELCO. The construction of Palacio Edén was part of a larger construction boom which took place across Mar del Plata between the 1950s and the 1970s.
