= List of presidents of the Central Bank of Argentina =

This is a list of presidents of the Central Bank of Argentina. The presidents and ministers of economy are listed for context, but the Central Bank has usually been an autarkic institution, except during military governments. As such, many presidents stay in the Central Bank across different presidencies, even of different political parties.

== List of presidents ==
Name	Tenure	President of Argentina during tenure	Minister of Economy of Argentina during tenure
Ernesto Bosch	1935–1945	Agustín Pedro Justo, Roberto Marcelino Ortiz, Ramón Castillo, Edelmiro Farrell	Alberto Hueyo, Federico Pinedo, Roberto Ortiz, Carlos Acevedo (Justo), Pedro Groppo, Federico Pinedo, Carlos Acevedo (Ortiz), Carlos Acevedo, César Ameghino (Castillo, Farrell)
Vicente Casares	1945	Edelmiro Farrell	Armando Antilles, Amaro Avalos
Emilio Cárdenas	1945–1946	Edelmiro Farrell	Amaro Avalos
Miguel Miranda	1946–1947	Juan Perón	Ramón Cereijo
Domingo Maroglio	1947–1949	Juan Perón	Ramón Cereijo
Alfredo Gómez Morales	1949–1952	Juan Perón	Ramón Cereijo
Miguel Revestido	1952–1955	Juan Perón	Ramón Cereijo, Alfredo Gómez Morales
Eugenio Folcini	1955	Eduardo Lonardi	Eugenio Folcini
Julio Alizon García	1955–1956	Eduardo Lonardi	Julio Alizon García
Eugenio Blanco	1956	Pedro Eugenio Aramburu	Eugenio Blanco
Eduardo Laurencena	1956–1958	Pedro Eugenio Aramburu, Arturo Frondizi	Roberto Verrier, Adalbert Krieger Vasena
José Mazar Barnet	1959	Arturo Frondizi	Emilio Del Carril
Eusebio Campos	1959–1960	Arturo Frondizi	Álvaro Alsogaray
Eustaquio Méndez Delfino	1960–1962	Arturo Frondizi, José María Guido	Roberto Alemann (Frondizi), Carlos Coll Benegas, Jorge Wehbe, Federico Pinedo (Guido)
Ricardo Pasman	1962	José María Guido	Álvaro Alsogaray
Luis Otero Monsegur	1962–1963	José María Guido	Eustaquio Méndez Delfino, José Alfredo Martínez de Hoz
Félix Elizalde	1963–1966	Arturo Illia	Eugenio Blanco, Juan Carlos Pugliese
Antonio Micele	1966	Juan Carlos Onganía	Jorge Salimei
Felipe Tami	1966	Juan Carlos Onganía	Jorge Salimei
Antonio Micele	1966	Juan Carlos Onganía	Jorge Salimei
Benedicto Bianchi	1966–1967	Juan Carlos Onganía	Jorge Salimei
Pedro Real	1967–1969	Juan Carlos Onganía	Adalbert Krieger Vasena
Egidio Iannella	1969–1970	Juan Carlos Onganía, Roberto M. Levingston	José Dagnino Pastore (Onganía), Carlos Moyano Llerena (Levingston)
Daniel Fernández	1970–1971	Roberto M. Levingston	Aldo Ferrer
Ricardo Gruneisen	1971	Roberto M. Levingston	Aldo Ferrer
Carlos Brignone	1971	Alejandro Lanusse	Juan Quilici, Cayetano Licciardo
Jorge Bermúdez Emparanza	1972–1973	Alejandro Lanusse	Cayetano Licciardo, Jorge Wehbe
Alfredo Gómez Morales	1973–1974	Héctor Cámpora, Raúl Lastiri, Juan Perón	José Ber Gelbard
Hernán Aldabe	1974	Isabel Perón	Alfredo Gómez Morales
Ricardo Cairoli	1974–1975	Isabel Perón	Celestino Rodrigo
Emilio Mondelli	1975–1976	Isabel Perón	Pedro Bonanni, Antonio Cafiero
Eduardo Zalduendo	1976	Isabel Perón	Emilio Mondelli
Alfredo Cassino	1976	Jorge Videla	José Alfredo Martínez de Hoz
Adolfo Diz	1976–1981	Jorge Videla	José Alfredo Martínez de Hoz
Julio Gómez	1981	Roberto Viola	Lorenzo Sigaut
Egidio Iannella	1981–1982	Leopoldo Galtieri	Roberto Alemann
Domingo Cavallo	1982	Reynaldo Bignone	José Dagnino Pastore
Julio González del Solar	1982–1983	Reynaldo Bignone	Jorge Wehbe
Enrique García Vázquez	1983–1985	Raúl Alfonsín	Bernardo Grinspun
Juan Concepción	(1985–1986)	Raúl Alfonsín	Juan Sourrouille
José Luis Machinea	1986–1989	Raúl Alfonsín	Juan Sourrouille
Enrique García Vázquez	1989	Raúl Alfonsín	Juan Sourrouille, Juan Carlos Pugliese, Jesús Rodríguez
Javier González Fraga	1989	Carlos Menem	Miguel Ángel Roig
Egidio Ianella	1989	Carlos Menem	Néstor Rapanelli
Rodolfo Rossi	1989–1990	Carlos Menem	Antonio Erman González
Enrique Folcini	1990	Carlos Menem	Antonio Erman González
Antonio Erman González	1990	Carlos Menem	Antonio Erman González
Javier González Fraga	1990–1991	Carlos Menem	Antonio Erman González
Roque Fernández	1991–1996	Carlos Menem	Domingo Cavallo
Pedro Pou	1996–2001	Carlos Menem, Fernando de la Rúa	Roque Fernández, José Luis Machinea, Ricardo López Murphy
Roque Maccarone	2001–2002	Fernando de la Rúa, Adolfo Rodríguez Saá	Domingo Cavallo, Nicolás Gallo, Rodolfo Frigeri
Mario Blejer	2002	Eduardo Duhalde	Jorge Remes Lenicov
Aldo Pignanelli	2002	Eduardo Duhalde	Roberto Lavagna
Alfonso Prat Gay	2002–2004	Eduardo Duhalde, Néstor Kirchner	Roberto Lavagna
Martín Redrado	2004–2010	Néstor Kirchner, Cristina Fernández de Kirchner	Roberto Lavagna, Felisa Miceli, Miguel Peirano, Martín Lousteau, Carlos Fernández, Amado Boudou
Mercedes Marcó del Pont	2010–2013	Cristina Fernández de Kirchner	Amado Boudou, Hernán Lorenzino, Axel Kicillof
Juan Carlos Fábrega	2013–2014	Cristina Fernández de Kirchner	Axel Kicillof
Alejandro Vanoli	2014–2015	Cristina Fernández de Kirchner	Axel Kicillof
Federico Sturzenegger	2015–2018	Mauricio Macri	Alfonso Prat-Gay, Luis Caputo, Nicolás Dujovne
Luis Caputo	2018	Mauricio Macri	Nicolás Dujovne
Guido Sandleris	2018–2019	Mauricio Macri	Nicolás Dujovne, Hernán Lacunza
Miguel Ángel Pesce	2019–2023	Alberto Fernández	Martín Guzmán, Silvina Batakis, Sergio Massa
Santiago Bausili	2023–present	Javier Milei	Luis Caputo
