= Adolfo Diz =

Argentine economist

President of the Central Bank of Argentina
- In office April 2, 1976 – March 27, 1981
- President: Jorge Rafael Videla
- Preceded by: Alfredo Cassino
- Succeeded by: Julio Gómez

Personal details
- Born: May 12, 1931 Buenos Aires, Argentina
- Died: October 12, 2008 (aged 77) Buenos Aires, Argentina
- Party: Independent
- Education: University of Buenos Aires University of Chicago

Adolfo César Diz (May 12, 1931 – October 12, 2008) was an Argentine economist who was President of the Central Bank of Argentina from 1976 until 1981.

== Life and times ==
Diz was born in Buenos Aires in 1931. He was known as "Vasco" to his friends and family due to his Basque descent from his mother, María Elisa Aristizabal Iparraguirre Lazaga y Gogorza. He married the former Martha E. Solari and had five children: Agustín, Joaquin, Diego, Rodrigo and Ramiro.

== Formation ==
Diz earned a bachelor in Economics from the University of Buenos Aires. He was then accepted at the University of Chicago, where he earned his master in 1957 and a PhD in Economics in 1966. A pupil of Milton Friedman, Diz was the precursor of the influential "Chicago Boys" in Latin America, where he cultivated relationships with other Chicago School graduates such as Ernesto Fontaine, Roque Fernández, Carlos Rodríguez, Fernando de Santibañes, and other well known Argentine economists trained by Arnold Harberger.

== IMF ==
Between 1967 and 1968 he was an executive director of the International Monetary Fund. He was appointed the Financial Representative for Argentina in Europe (in Geneva), serving until 1973, and in 1974 was named director of the Centre for Latin American Monetary Studies (CEMLA), an institution that promotes a better understanding of monetary and banking matters in Latin America and the Caribbean, as well as the pertinent aspects of fiscal and exchange rate policies.

== Tenure at the Central Bank ==
The advent of the National Reorganization Process, the last Argentine dictatorship, on March 24, 1976, led to Diz's appointment as President of the Central Bank of Argentina on April 2. Central Bank Presidents in Argentina are largely subordinate as policy makers to the Economy Minister, and as were many of his predecessors, Diz was recommended to the post by the new Economy Minister (in this case, José Alfredo Martínez de Hoz).

Diz simplified multiple exchange rates for the elimination of exchange controls, and business sentiment recovered amid higher exports, lower inflation, and a stabilized peso.

He then began a series of measures deregulating finance. The first, the Financial Entities Law, was enacted by the Central Bank on June 1, 1977, and introduced a sweeping deregulation of the nation's financial sector, including commercial banks, while prohibiting non-profit banking and imposing minimum capital requirements of US$10 million. New regulations shuttered numerous Argentine credit unions and community banks, which in a bid to survive, were granted a charter by Diz to form Credico-op Bank in 1979.

Domestic credit was also stymied by the new policies, particularly the Monetary Regulation Account Law of 1977, which raised reserve requirements to 45% of deposits, thereby doubling borrowers' interest rates while eliminating yields on demand deposits; GDP, which had grown by 5% amid the improved business sentiment, fell by over 3% in the year after these policy changes as fixed investment plummeted.

Investment banking, in turn, flourished under the Central Bank's laissez-faire approach towards them, as well as by its extension of deposit insurance on high yield accounts. A variety of exotic investment vehicles became available in Argentina around 1979, while private, financial sector foreign debt ballooned to over US$30 billion (a third of GDP).

Part of an anti-inflation package unveiled in late 1978 (prices had risen 175% annually for two years), Diz implemented Martínez de Hoz's Exchange Timetable (the Tablita). The pre-announced, progressively smaller devaluations of the peso encouraged the financial sector, and the economy benefited from both a recovering credit market, as well as from lower inflation (which slowed to half the 1978 rate). The disproportionately slow crawling peg approach helped make the peso one of the world's most overvalued currencies by 1980, however, and the collapse of the BIR, a heavily leveraged newer bank, on March 28, touched off a wave of capital flight as fears of an imminent crisis mounted.

Diz responded on April 1 by implementing Central Bank Circular 1050, a measure designed at the Economy Ministry. The policy tied monthly loan interest payments (almost all lending in Argentina is on an adjustable basis) to the local value of the US dollar. The timetable, made unsustainable by the balance of payments crisis, was abandoned in February 1981, however, and both the Economy Minister and his protégé, Adolfo Diz, stepped down at the end of March; even as those privy to inside information from the Central Bank profited with the collapse of the peso, a large number of homeowners and other borrowers were bankrupted by the sharply higher monthly payments imposed by Circular 1050.

== Later career ==
Following his departure from the Central Bank, Diz began a teaching career at the Universities of Buenos Aires and Tucumán. He also served as visiting professor at the Argentine Catholic University, University of Belgrano, and University of San Andrés, ultimately becoming a member of the faculty of the Universidad del CEMA, where he taught International Finance as part of the Bachelor in Economics program.

As a consultant, he worked for the IMF, World Bank, Fondo Andino de Reservas, and for several Latin American central banks, as well as in numerous countries in Africa, Central and South Asia, and Eastern Europe. Diz was designated as a member of the National Academy of Economic Sciences in 1994.

As a researcher, he has published several works on supply and demand (University of Chicago), money supply (CEMLA, Mexico), IMF Conditionality (Federal Reserve Bank of Boston), and fiscal impact measurement (IMF, Venezuela).

Diz died in Buenos Aires at age 77.

== See also ==
- Economic history of Argentina
- Universidad del CEMA
- Chicago School of Economics
- Big Bang (financial markets)

Preceded by Alfredo G. Cassino	President of the Central Bank of Argentina; 1976–1981	Succeeded by Julio José Gómez
