= Mario Blejer =

Argentine-Israeli economist (born 1948)

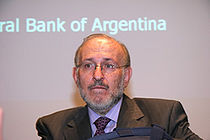

President of the Central Bank of Argentina
- In office January 21, 2002 – June 21, 2002
- Preceded by: Roque Maccarone
- Succeeded by: Aldo Pignanelli

Personal details
- Born: June 11, 1948 (age 78) Córdoba, Argentina
- Education: Hebrew University of Jerusalem; University of Chicago
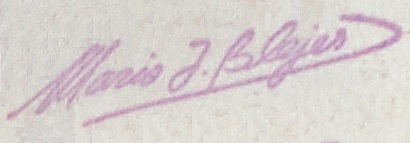
- Signature

Mario I. Blejer (born June 11, 1948) is an Argentine-Israeli economist and a former president of the Central Bank of Argentina.

== Life and times ==
Blejer was born in Córdoba, Argentina, in 1948, to a Jewish family, and he is an orthodox Jew. At the age of 20 he emigrated to Israel, served a short time in the IDF, and then enrolled at the Hebrew University of Jerusalem, and graduated cum laude with degrees in Economics and Jewish History in 1970, as well as with a master's degree in Economics from the same institution, in 1972. He went on to earn a Ph.D. in the latter discipline at the University of Chicago (1975), and joined the Boston University Department of Economics as an assistant professor, where he remained until 1980.

== Advisor ==
He joined the International Monetary Fund as an adviser on monetary, exchange rate, and fiscal policy in 1980, and briefly taught at George Washington University and the New York University Graduate School of Business. He lectured at the Johns Hopkins University School of Advanced International Studies between 1986 and 1991, and was appointed the World Bank's Senior European and Central Asian Policy adviser in 1992, serving in that capacity during one of the most challenging years of the collapse of the Soviet Union. He them served as a member of the IMF Staff Papers Editorial Board until 1996, and of the European Journal of Political Economy, from 1997 to 2001.

== Academics ==
Blejer also taught at the Central European University in Budapest, from 1996 to 2000, and contributed to an array to economic policy publications, notably the American Economic Review, Journal of Political Economy, International Economic Review, The Economic Journal, Journal of Development Economics, Review of Economics and Statistics, Canadian Journal of Economics, Economic Development and Cultural Change.

== Central Bank ==
A rapidly deteriorating 1998–2002 Argentine great depression in March 2001 led Blejer to accept President Fernando de la Rúa's offer of a post as vice president of the Central Bank of Argentina, whereby he left the IMF as Senior Adviser, and after a 21-year career. Following de la Rúa's resignation in December, and that of Central Bank President Roque Maccarone in January, Blejer was named as the latter's replacement by President Eduardo Duhalde, on January 21. Blejer, who took office at the depth of the worst local crisis since the Panic of 1890, was appointed not only for the good rapport he enjoyed with international figures such as United States Federal Reserve Chairman Alan Greenspan, Treasury Secretary Paul O'Neill and his Deputy, John B. Taylor, but also because he remained among the few prominent economists to be in good terms with a wide variety of Argentine political figures: he was recommended by Economy Minister Domingo Cavallo during the free market advocate's brief last turn at the post, and was close to diverse leaders such as center-left Congresswoman Elisa Carrió, and center-right economist Ricardo López Murphy (both these latter would be candidates in the April 2003 presidential elections).

Blejer's appointment on January 21, 2002, was partly a result of Maccarone's link to the unpopular account withdrawal limits instituted the previous December, as well as to the latter's support for a more liberal bankruptcy law, which the nation's banks opposed. A supporter of lifting the withdrawal limits (corralito), Blejer prepared a plan to achieve this though treasury bills, whereby depositors would be allowed to withdraw larger amounts only by accepting these as payment, in lieu of cash. Seeking to guarantee their future value, he also revived a plan for the dollarization of the Argentine economy (a policy first suggested by former Central Bank President Pedro Pou in 1999). These policies met with the opposition of Duhalde's new Economy Minister, Roberto Lavagna, however, and in June, Blejer resigned.

== Return a its former work ==
He was subsequently offered a post as adviser to the Bank of England, and by September, called for the full lifting of the corralito, which ultimately took place in stages from December 2002, to the following March. In London, Blejer also served as an adviser to the International Economics Program at Chatham House, from 2004 to 2007, and was named Director of the Bank of England's Centre for Central Banking Studies.

Fallout from the international, 2008 financial crisis later forced the Argentine government of President Cristina Kirchner to seek domestic financing for growing public spending, as well as for foreign debt service obligations. The president ordered a US$6.7 billion account opened at the Central Bank for the latter purpose in December 2009, implying the use of the Central Bank's foreign exchange reserves, and drawing direct opposition from the institution's President, Martín Redrado. Following an impasse, Redrado was dismissed by President Kirchner on January 7, 2010, prior to which Economy Minister Amado Boudou had announced that Mario Blejer (who had expressed support for the measure) would be appointed in his stead. Redrado, however, refused to step down, and President Kirchner's decree removing him was overruled by Judge María José Sarmiento, temporarily reinstating Redrado as president of the central bank; Redrado was ultimately replaced by Mercedes Marcó del Pont.

Blejer, who remained in Argentina, contributed a number of op-ed columns for Clarín, the leading Argentine news daily; he expressed support for the Wall Street Reform and Consumer Protection Act signed in the United States by President Barack Obama, while citing the need for further regulation of the world's fitful financial markets.

Also, he is on the advisory board of OMFIF where he is regularly involved in meetings regarding the financial and monetary system.

== Bibliography ==
- Mario I. Bléjer; A. Cheasty (1993). How to Measure the Fiscal Deficit. International Monetary Fund. ISBN 978-1-55775-192-8.
