= Fraga (surname) =

Fraga is a surname of Portuguese and Galician origin. Notable people with the surname include:

- Agustín Fraga (born 2002), Argentine rugby union player
- Alex Fraga (born 1986), Brazilian footballer
- Alberto Fraga (born 1956), Brazilian police officer and politician
- Alfonso Fraga-Pérez (born 1941), Cuban attorney and diplomat
- Arminio Fraga (born 1957), Brazilian economist
- Augusto Fraga (1920–2000), Portuguese film director
- Augusto Pacheco Fraga (born 1988), Brazilian footballer
- Chico Fraga (born 1954), Brazilian footballer
- Dan Fraga (born 1973), American comic book artist
- Denise Fraga (born 1964), Brazilian actress
- Edimar Fraga (born 1986), Brazilian footballer
- Eduardo Fraga (born 1973), Brazilian martial artist
- Felipe Fraga (born 1995), Brazilian racing driver
- Igor Fraga (born 1998), Brazilian racing driver
- Javier González Fraga (born 1948), Argentine economist and businessman
- Jay Fraga (born 1972), American activist and BMX racer
- José María Robles Fraga (born 1956), Spanish politician and diplomat
- Kelly Fraga (born 1974), Brazilian Olympic volleyball player
- Luis Fraga, American political scientist
- Manuel Fraga (1922–2012), Spanish professor and politician
- Marta Fraga (born 1985), Spanish tennis player
- Miguel Ángel Fraga (born 1987), Mexican footballer
- Pedro Fraga (born 1983), Portuguese Olympic rower
- Teresa Fraga, Mexican-American teacher and activist
- Tiago Fraga (born 1981), Brazilian footballer
- Wellington Pinto Fraga (born 1982), Brazilian footballer

== Fictional characters ==
- Belén Fraga, fictional character from Argentine telanovella Chiquititas, played by Romina Yan
