= José Alfredo Martínez de Hoz =

Argentine lawyer, businessman, and economist (1925–2013)

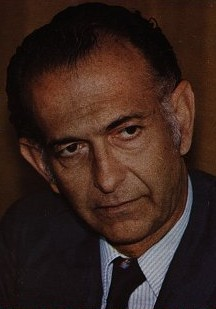

Minister of Economy of Argentina
- In office 29 March 1976 – 31 March 1981
- President: Jorge Rafael Videla
- Preceded by: Joaquín de la Heras
- Succeeded by: Lorenzo Sigaut
- In office 21 May 1963 – 12 October 1963
- President: José María Guido
- Preceded by: Eustaquio Méndez Delfino
- Succeeded by: Eugenio Blanco

Personal details
- Born: 13 August 1925 Buenos Aires, Argentina
- Died: 16 March 2013 (aged 87) Buenos Aires, Argentina
- Party: Independent
- Education: University of Buenos Aires University of Cambridge
- Website: Official website

José Alfredo Martínez de Hoz (13 August 1925 – 16 March 2013) was an Argentine lawyer, businessman, and economist. He was the Minister of Economy of Argentina during the country's last military dictatorship (1976—1983) (especifically during Jorge Rafael Videla's regime, between 1976 and 1981), and shaped the economic policy of the dictatorship until its end.

Martínez de Hoz was an economic orthodox of businessman origin, who imposed a plan of economic neoliberalism reforms in the 1970s that aroused strong controversies. From 1976 until today, globalization began to appear and some attempts of insertion in the world began. His economic views were based on libertarianism and anti-keynesianism. The spirit of all the reforms implemented during his administration was that of economic liberalization and "economic freedom", and its results and legacy are highly controversial to this day, either being praised or strongly criticized in Argentina depending on the period and side of the general political spectrum.

== Biography ==
Martínez de Hoz, scion of one Argentina's oldest cattle ranching families, was born in Buenos Aires, Argentina. Pursuing higher studies at the University of Cambridge, he returned and in 1955, following the Revolucion Libertadora coup against President Juan Domingo Perón, he was appointed his province's Minister of the Economy of Buenos Aires Province.

== Minister of Economy with Guido ==
Though democracy returned to Argentina three years later, the armed forces continued to exercise vetting power over most policy and in 1963, Martínez de Hoz became one of a series of conservative Argentine Economy Ministers during José María Guido's brief presidency (an interlude marked by squabbles among the military brass and recession).

== Private career ==
Becoming an influential lobbyist for Acindar, one of Argentina's largest steel manufacturers, Martínez de Hoz became its CEO in 1968. Seven years later, after union labourers at Acindar's Villa Constitución plant elected a socialist shop steward, Martínez de Hoz retaliated by using his family's long-standing connections with the armed forces to have them brutally repressed. Supported by Metalworkers Union leader Lorenzo Miguel, security forces abducted the new shop steward, Alberto Piccinini, and about 300 others (most of whom were murdered).

== Minister of Economy under Videla's administration ==
By 1975, Argentina had considerably developed, but was nevertheless in the throes of some of the worst instability since 1930. Argentine public opinion turned to the military, who deposed Isabel Perón's weak regime in a March 1976 coup.

Inheriting a wave of violence and 700% inflation, Jorge Rafael Videla called on Martínez de Hoz as Minister of Economy.

Anxious to restore business confidence, announced a plan to further open Argentina's markets, believing that the country's national industry was inefficient and uncompetitive internationally. He moved to lessen Argentina's trade barriers quickly, which he believed to be a cause of economic isolation. He enjoyed the personal friendship of David Rockefeller, who facilitated Chase Manhattan Bank and International Monetary Fund loans of nearly US$1 billion following his appointment.

He eliminated all price control systems. The black market and shortages disappeared; and he repealed the exchange control regime. A single floating exchange rate was born.

He freed exports (removed existing prohibitions and quotas and export taxes were repealed) and imports (removed existing prohibitions, quotas, and licenses and gradually reduced import tariffs).

He decreed a general freeze on wages, and instituted a value-added tax while rescinding the inheritance tax. This last measure allowed him to avoid paying taxes on the land and investments, valued at several billion dollars at the time, that he inherited from his father. As a result of the changes instituted by Martínez de Hoz, inflation fell sharply; but, many local retailers and home builders became incapable of coping with the fall in demand and declared bankruptcy.

He eliminated political tariffs for public services and subsidized prices for fuels, to begin a look at the economy and the subsidies and overprotections for privileged sectors of the economy.

A year later, the billion-dollar trade deficit had turned around and business investment had soared by about 25%. However, real wages had lost nearly 40% of their purchasing power, and while consumer spending remained weak, the shock might have been worse but for hitherto high savings rates. Inflation revived again, and Martínez de Hoz responded in June 1977, with deregulation of the financial markets, removing checks on banks and transferring responsibility for any bad loans to the state, which took charge of their debt as needed.

The Central Bank, like many key economic posts in the Martínez de Hoz era, was led by one of a number of Chicago Boys: Adolfo Diz. Diz enacted much of the Economy Minister's financial deregulation policy, while moving to limit domestic credit. He enacted the Monetary Regulation Account Law of 1977, which raised reserve requirements to 45% of deposits, thereby doubling borrowers' interest rates while eliminating yields on demand deposits.

Total GDP grew 2.2% equivalent annually between 1975 and 1980. Between 1975 and 1979 there was a trade surplus, only in 1980 did the trade deficit appear. During the period, the lowest unemployment rates in the history of the Argentine economy were observed. Particularly from 1979, as a consequence of the second oil shock, the external debt increased strongly.

Years later he explained in his books that his management "had a 'gradualist' character; he set out to implement a structural reform of the economy, and not just overcome a crisis. On April 2, 1976, three programs were announced: liberation and modernization of the economy, modernization of the state and stabilization of prices. They would have to be applied interconnected, although not necessarily simultaneously. The great courses of action were the subsidiary function of the State and the opening of the economy."

Short-term financial speculation flourished, while chronic tax evasion and budget deficits remained high. Frequent wage freeze decrees continued to depress living standards generally and income inequality increased. During his tenure, the foreign debt increased fourfold, and disparities between the upper and lower classes became much more pronounced. The period ended in a tenfold devaluation and one of the worst financial crises in Argentine history.

=== "Sweet money" ===
Again in recession by 1978, the economy continued to be saddled with inflation around 175%. Image-conscious and so, fearful of possible riots, Martínez de Hoz relented and in December, he issued new, more generous wage guidelines. To address his fellow conservatives' fear that this might lead to even higher inflation, he introduced a novel take on the currency crawling peg: fixed, progressively smaller devaluations of the official exchange rate between the Argentine peso and the US dollar set by a monthly timetable, popularly known as the Tablita.

The Tablita invariably set a slower depreciation of the peso value than what local inflation warranted and although inflation did ease somewhat, imported goods and foreign credit soon became much cheaper than those locally available. Imports almost tripled in volume and by 1980, the peso became one of the most overvalued currencies in the world; its high purchasing power abroad soon had many referring to it as sweet money. Record numbers of Argentines now vacationed abroad, often stocking up on appliances; between the suddenly negative trade deficit and tourists' foreign spending, however, this chalked up a then-record US$4 billion annual loss for the national balance sheet in both 1980 and 1981.

Having already suffered from weakened demand, many industries (particularly smaller factories) could not compete with the flood of imports and a second wave of industry bankruptcies began. Ostensibly to avoid a sharp rise in unemployment, Martínez de Hoz took an even more controversial step when he decided to begin absorbing private sector debts (mostly those of the well-connected, including US$700 million of Acindar's) into the national debt. One of his chief business interests, the insolvent Compañía Italo Argentina de Electricidad, was nationalised at his orders at a reported cost of US$394 million.

The economy was still in relatively high gear and, with rising fiscal revenues, the nation's finances appeared healthy during 1979 and 1980. Secretly, however (as much of this data was censored at time), local speculators were taking advantage of the overvalued peso by taking up over US$30 billion in loans overseas. This money soon found itself in risky gambles at home and abroad and when one bank's Ponzi scheme collapsed in March 1980, Martínez de Hoz responded to the possible panic by luring investors with one-year treasury bills, paying 60% in US dollars. Facing these pressures, the Argentine peso increasingly became the object of short-selling by insiders, including Martínez de Hoz himself.

=== Circular 1050 and the shattered Tablita ===
Martínez de Hoz addresses the nation in a 12 March 1981, farewell address

The end of his tenure soon near and increasingly unpopular, in April 1980 Martínez de Hoz had the Central Bank promulgate new regulations governing adjustable loans. The Central Bank Circular 1050 tied monthly loan interest payments (almost all lending in Argentina is on an adjustable basis) to the value of the US dollar vis-a-vis the peso. Borrowers were confident that the gradual peso devaluations would continue on schedule and new homeowners rushed to secure (or refinance) mortgages at these favourable terms. Brokerage houses proliferated as put options against the peso increased sharply and in February 1981, Martínez de Hoz announced the unthinkable: the time had come for a sharp devaluation. The Tablita was shattered and he retired the following month.

What followed was one of the worst financial crises in the history of modern Argentina. Speculators quickly took advantage of the 1977 deregulation to write off their debts, legitimate borrowers (including many large employers) were faced with suddenly unaffordable US dollar payments, and homeowners' monthly payments (tied by the Circular 1050 to the value of the dollar) rose by over tenfold during the next fifteen months.

== Legacy ==
It took defeat during the disastrous Malvinas War in June 1982 to usher in more moderate leadership in the junta. In July, the new Central Bank President, Domingo Cavallo, rescinded the hated "1050". Thousands were saved from financial ruin by this change, but the economic damage would remain.

Business confidence was destroyed by the whole calamity and even though Argentina's productive Agricultural sector brought in over US$34 billion in trade surpluses over the next eight years, none of it sufficed to deal with chronic capital flight or the newly monstrous public debt (US$7 billion at the start of the dictatorship, growing to US$43 billion by the time democracy was restored in 1983).

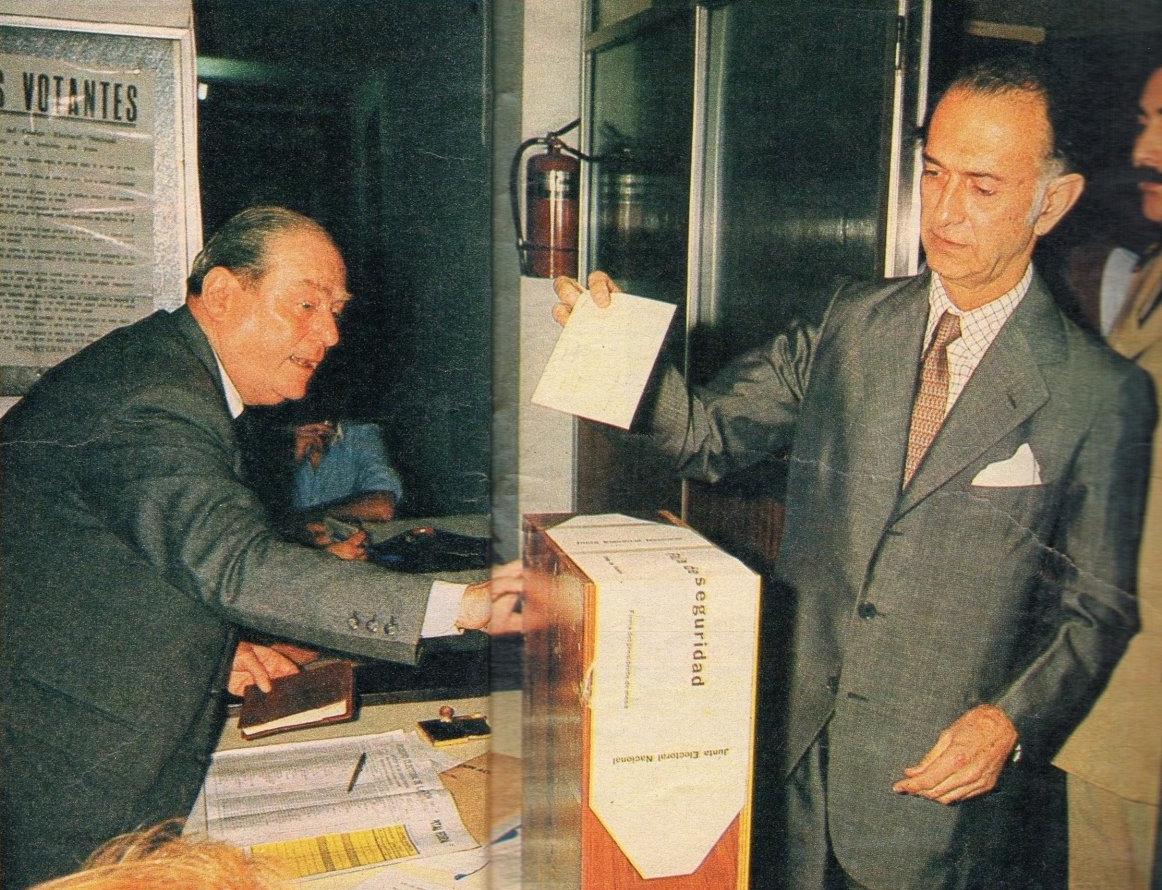
Martinez de Hoz voting in the 1983 general elections

Martínez de Hoz was himself indicted in 1988 for his involvement in the human rights abuses at Acindar and spent 77 days in jail. Quickly freed, he subsequently benefited from a pardon by President Carlos Menem in 1990. Returning to the world of high finance despite a 1992 conviction of operating a brokerage with a revoked licence, Martínez de Hoz became a member of the board of directors of two arbitrage houses, Rohm Group and the Banco General de Negocios ("General Business Bank").

The General Business Bank, now defunct, later helped clients illegally wire up to US$30 billion out of the country prior to the December 2001 financial crisis.

In 2006, a judge declared the pardon unconstitutional and revoked the suspension of the previous judicial process, paving the way to investigate Martínez de Hoz's alleged involvement in the kidnapping and extortion of Federico and Miguel Gutheim (a local textile mill owner and his son) in 1976, as well as the murder of Juan Carlos Casariego (one of his own assistants at the Ministry of Economy).

Martinez de Hoz was arrested on 5 April 2007, following a Supreme Court ruling deeming the 1990 presidential pardons unconstitutional, and was given a preliminary sentence of house arrest (due to his advanced age) on 4 May 2010, pursuant to his indictment in the Gutheim case.

Preceded by Joaquín de las Heras	Minister of Economy; 1976–1981	Succeeded by Lorenzo Sigaut
