= Miguel Ángel Pesce =

Argentine economist (born 1962)

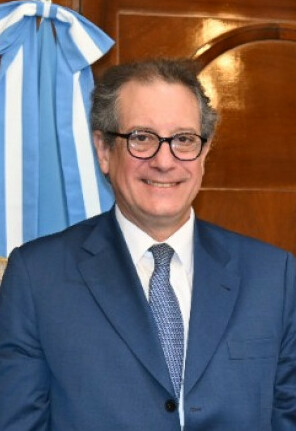

President of the Central Bank of Argentina
- In office 10 December 2019 – 10 December 2023
- President: Alberto Fernández
- Preceded by: Guido Sandleris
- Succeeded by: Santiago Bausili

Vice President of the Central Bank of Argentina
- In office 24 September 2004 – 12 December 2015
- Preceded by: Pedro Lacoste
- Succeeded by: Lucas Llach

Personal details
- Born: 20 September 1962 (age 64) Mendoza Province, Argentina
- Education: University of Buenos Aires
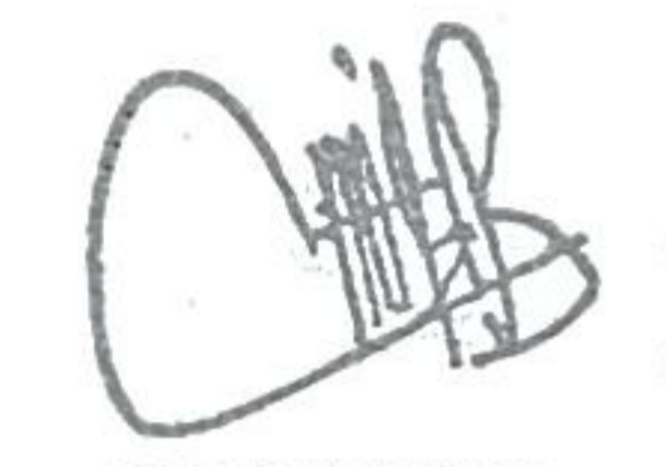
- Signature

Miguel Ángel Pesce (born 20 September 1962) is an Argentine economist who served as president of the Central Bank of Argentina in the Alberto Fernández administration, from 2019 to 2023. Pesce previously served as vice president of the Central Bank from 2004 to 2015, during the successive presidencies of Néstor Kirchner and Cristina Fernández de Kirchner.

== Early life and education ==
Born in eastern Mendoza Province, Pesce is a University of Buenos Aires graduate.

== Career ==
Pesce served as General Comptroller of Argentina in 2004 and as Secretary of Finances in the Buenos Aires city government during the mayorship of Aníbal Ibarra. A member of the centrist Radical Civic Union (UCR), Pesce became a Kirchnerist UCR ally during Néstor Kirchner's 2003-07 presidency.

Tapped to head the Central Bank by newly-elected President Alberto Fernández in late 2019, Pesce initially cut benchmark interest rates, from 63% to 38%, in an effort to spur economic growth following a deep, two-year recession.

Following severe economic fallout from the global COVID-19 crisis, with GDP falling by 9.9%, Argentina's economy rebounded by 10.4% in 2021 and 5.7% in January–April 2022. Inflation, however, remained stubbornly high - initially slowing from 54% in 2019 to 36% in 2020; but rising to over 60% by May 2022. The official exchange rate, moreover, doubled during Pesce's first 30 months in office to 130 pesos per dollar - while the parallel "blue" rate nearly quadrupled, to 270 pesos.

== Other activities ==
- Financial Stability Board (FSB), Ex-Officio Member (since 2019)
