= Vanoli =

Vanoli is a surname. Notable people with the surname include:

- Alejandro Vanoli (born 1961), Argentine economist and public official
- Paolo Vanoli (born 1972), retired Italian football player
- Rodolfo Vanoli (born 1963), retired Italian football player
