= Mercedes Marcó del Pont =

Argentine economist and politician

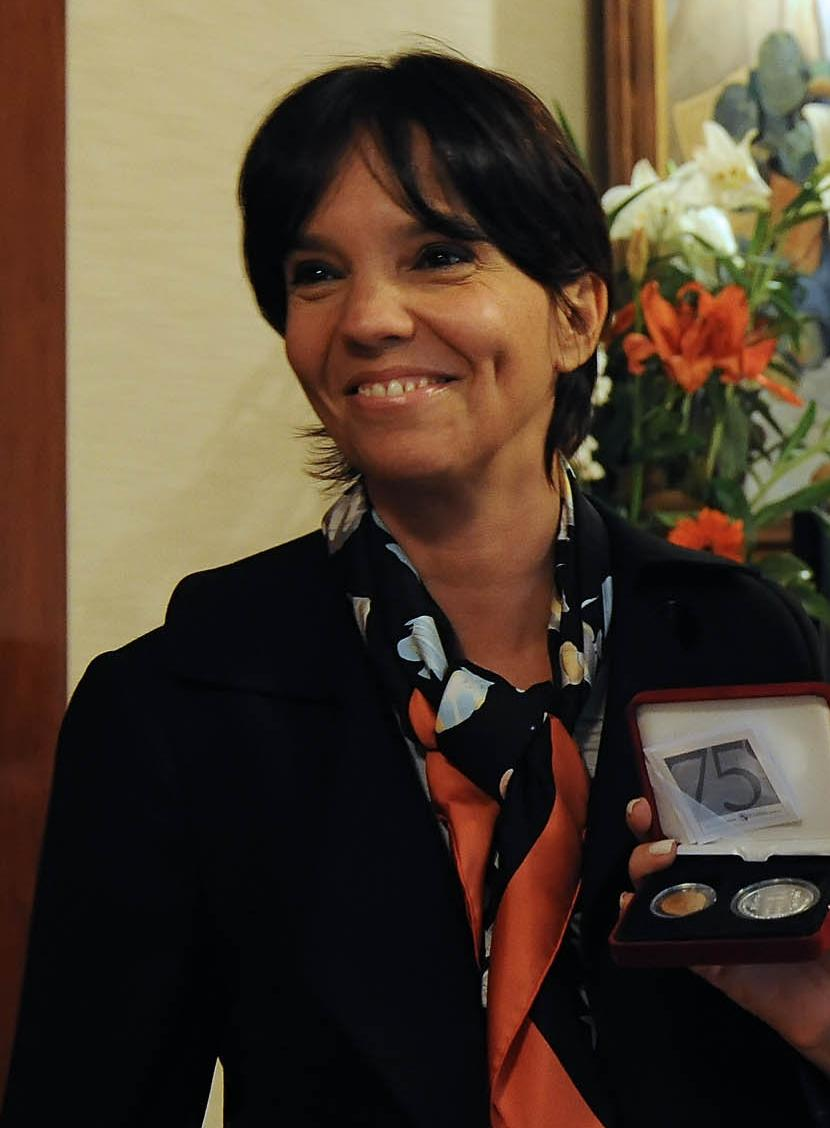

Secretary of Strategic Affairs
- In office 1 August 2022 – 10 December 2023
- President: Alberto Fernández
- Preceded by: Gustavo Béliz
- Succeeded by: Jorge Jesús Antelo

Federal Administrator of Public Income
- In office 10 December 2019 – 29 July 2022
- President: Alberto Fernández
- Preceded by: Leandro Cuccioli
- Succeeded by: Carlos Castagneto

President of the Central Bank of Argentina
- In office 3 February 2010 – 18 November 2013
- Preceded by: Miguel Ángel Pesce (interim)
- Succeeded by: Juan Carlos Fábrega

National Deputy
- In office 10 December 2005 – 28 February 2008
- Constituency: City of Buenos Aires

Personal details
- Born: 28 August 1957 (age 69) Buenos Aires, Argentina
- Party: Integration and Development Movement
- Other political affiliations: Front for Victory (2010–2015); Frente de Todos (2019–present)
- Education: University of Buenos Aires
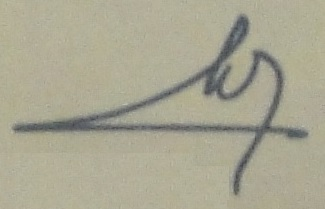
- Signature

Mercedes Marcó del Pont (born 28 August 1957) is an Argentine economist and politician who was President of the Central Bank of Argentina. She has also served as a member of the National Chamber of Deputies, as head of the Federal Public Income Administration, and as Secretary of Strategic Affairs in the Presidency of Argentina under Alberto Fernandez.

== Early life and career ==
Mercedes Marcó del Pont was born and raised in Barrio Norte, Buenos Aires. The Marcó del Pont family first arrived in what today is Argentina in 1785 from Catalonia, and became prominent in commerce. She took an interest in politics in her teens, and became affiliated with the centrist Integration and Development Movement (MID), a party whose platform focused on support for import substitution industrialization and foreign direct investment. She enrolled at the University of Buenos Aires, and earned a degree in Economics in 1982. She joined CLACSO, the Latin American Social Sciences Council, in 1984, and was a teaching assistant at her alma mater's School of Economics, and taught a specialized course in the discipline for members of the Sanitation Workers' Federation in 1985. She was accepted as a Master's Degree candidate at Yale University's Economic Growth Center, and earned her postgraduate in International and Development Economics in 1987.

Returning to Argentina, she was a senior researcher for the Development Research Foundation (FIDE), a think tank founded by Octavio Frigerio (son of the late MID leader, Rogelio Julio Frigerio, and Marcó de Pont's cousin). She entered public service in 1989 as chief advisor on petrochemical industry policy for the Economy Ministry's Planning Secretariat, and following her departure, was named Director of FIDE in 1991. She served over the next decade as a consultant on statistics and investment incentive policies for the city of Buenos Aires, and for the provinces of Buenos Aires and Misiones. She authored a number of papers on the local effects of globalization, on the 1992 Brady Plan for foreign debt reduction, on the Convertibility Plan for exchange rate stabilization, and on the labor market, among other topics.

Marcó del Pont was briefly chief policy advisor for Production Minister José Ignacio de Mendiguren (January to March 2002), and authored a book, Crisis y Reforma Económica, in 2004.

== Political career ==
Marcó del Pont was elected to the Lower House of Congress on the Front for Victory (FPV) ticket in the 2005 mid-term elections. She seconded Education Minister Daniel Filmus on the federal district's FPV party list for elections to the Senate in 2007; in an otherwise banner year, the FPV was defeated in that race, however.

A supporter of shaping monetary policy to advance economic and employment growth, in March 2008 she was named President of state-owned Banco Nación, the largest commercial bank in Argentina. Following controversy surrounding President Cristina Kirchner's decision to earmark foreign exchange reserves to retire high-interest government bonds, and Central Bank President Martín Redrado's exit in January 2010, Marcó del Pont was named President of the Central Bank of Argentina on February 3.

Upon the election of Alberto Fernández as President of Argentina in 2019, she was appointed as head of the Administración Federal de Ingresos Públicos, Argentina's federal tax administration. In 2022, she was appointed Secretary of Strategic Affairs in the Presidential Office, succeeding Gustavo Béliz.

== Personal life ==
Marcó del Pont married Jorge Cafferata, a prominent local psychiatrist, and had three children. Teaching at the National University of Lomas de Zamora between 1999 and 2002, she joined developmentalist economist Aldo Ferrer and other University of Buenos Aires academics in Plan Fénix, which advocated a more balanced globalization.
