= José Luis Machinea =

Argentine economist

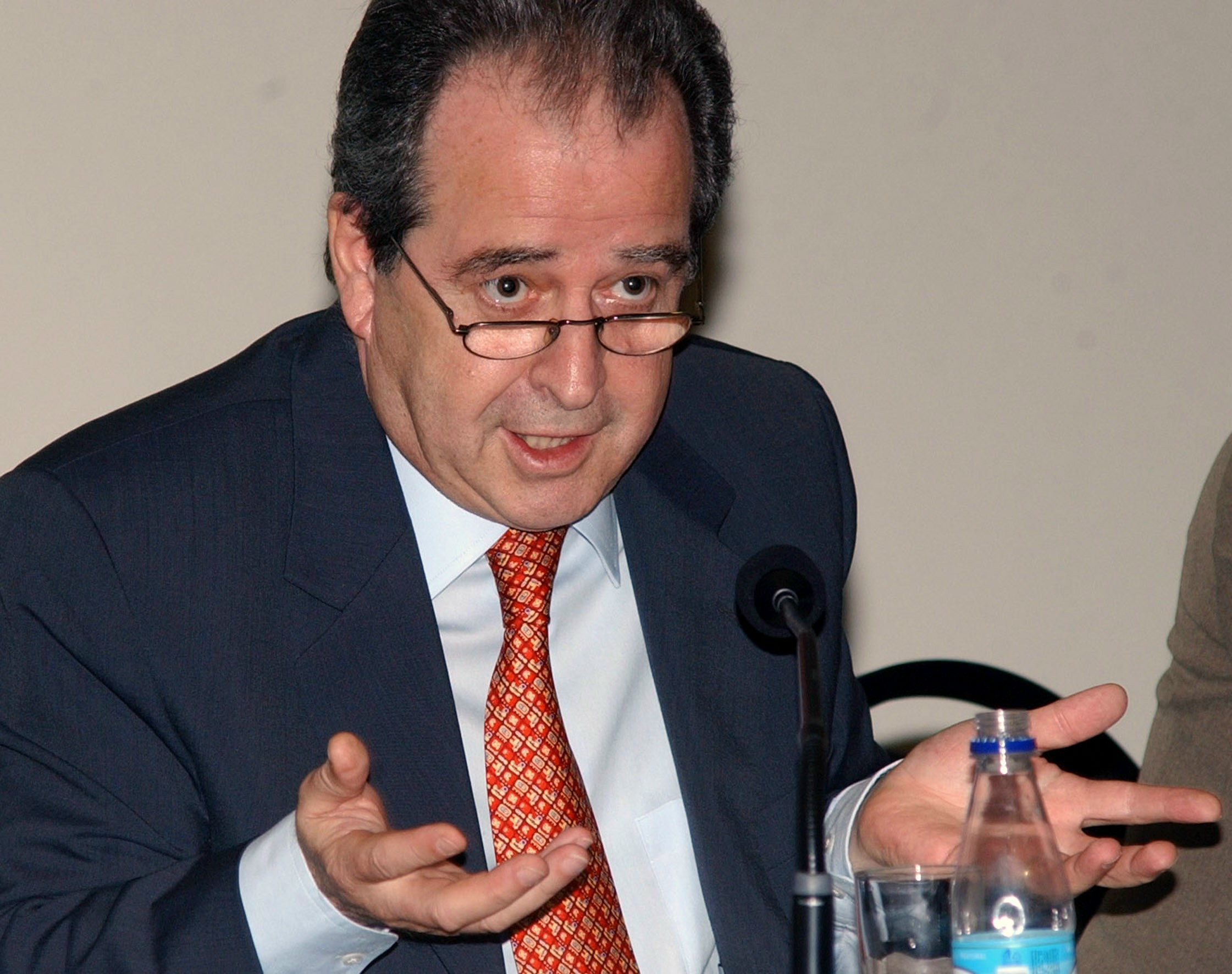

Minister of Economy of Argentina
- In office December 10, 1999 – March 5, 2001
- President: Fernando de la Rúa
- Preceded by: Roque Fernández
- Succeeded by: Ricardo López Murphy

President of the Central Bank of Argentina
- In office August 25, 1986 – April 4, 1989
- President: Raúl Alfonsín
- Preceded by: Juan Alfredo Concepción
- Succeeded by: Enrique García Vázquez

Personal details
- Born: October 5, 1946 (age 80) Buenos Aires
- Party: Radical Civic Union
- Education: Pontifical Catholic University of Argentina

José Luis Machinea (born October 5, 1946) is an Argentine economist and United Nations official. He was Minister of Economy and President of the Central Bank.

== Career ==
Machinea was born in Buenos Aires, and earned a degree in Economics from the Universidad Católica Argentina in 1968. He first entered public service in 1974, as a member of the Central Bank's Center for Monetary and Banking Policy Studies. He became head of the institution's Statistics and Research Bureau in 1983, and in August 1986, President Raúl Alfonsín appointed the young economist President of the Central Bank.

Machinea sought to limit central bank liabilities caused by non-performing loans to the nation's then-myriad State enterprises and agencies. He responded to growing inflation, which had been tamed somewhat in 1986, but which had grown to over 20% a month in mid-1988, by helping outline a Plan Primavera ("Springtime Plan"). Enacted on August 3, it initially reduced inflation by flooding the market with the central bank's foreign exchange reserves, thereby curving the chief cause for the inflation crisis: the demand for US dollars. Following Machinea's curtailment of the central bank's dollar sales on February 6, 1989, however, the exchange rate ballooned uncontrollably, and he resigned on March 31. These developments led to monthly inflation rates of over 100% by mid-year, as well as unprecedented riots and looting.

He returned to the private sector in the 1990s as a consultant and in economic research organizations. He then served as Minister of Economy under President Fernando de la Rúa from December 1999 until March 2001, when he was replaced by Ricardo López Murphy.

The main objective of the new management was to reduce the fiscal deficit through the approval of the Tax Reform Law, which envisaged to increase the income tax, take away retirements greater than 3100 pesos - 3100 dollars and generalize the application of the Tax to the Value Added. Basically, they meant an increase of almost all internal taxes.

A highlight of his tenure was having successfully negotiated an agreement with the International Monetary Fund in January 2001 to refinance and exchange Argentine debt bonds for US$39.7 billion, avoiding a default and providing fresh funds. In exchange, the Argentine government agreed to implement measures requested by the IMF, which included reducing future pensions and deregulation of labour unions' work insurance. This operation was informally called the Blindaje (that is, "the Armour") because it was intended to protect Argentina from the effects of the ongoing economic crisis, but ultimately failed, as President de la Rúa resigned in December 2001 and Argentina defaulted on its debt in early 2002.

With regards to the growth of the Argentine economy after the beginning of the recovery (around 9% annually, from 2003 to 2007), Machinea has called it "spectacular", but he has expressed doubts about the use of price controls (implemented by the administration of Néstor Kirchner) to control inflation in the long run. He has also stated that Argentina is already past the recovery phase, with current challenges being the attraction of investments to sustain a moderate growth over time.

Machinea served as the ninth Executive Secretary of the United Nations Economic Commission for Latin America and the Caribbean, from December 10, 2003 to May 13, 2008.

== Bibliography ==
- José Luis Machinea (2010). La crisis económica en América Latina: alcances e impactos. Siglo XXI de España Editores. ISBN 978-84-323-1483-4.

Preceded by Roque Fernández	Minister of Economy; 1999–2001	Succeeded by Ricardo López Murphy
