= Necessity and Urgency Decree =

Emergency decree issued by the President of Argentina

A Necessity and Urgency Decree (Spanish: Decreto de necesidad y urgencia, also known as DNU) is a special kind of order issued by the President of Argentina. Unlike regular decrees, which are used in Argentina for rulemaking, a DNU has the force of law. Once the President promulgates a DNU, it comes into force almost immediately; afterwards, the National Congress must examine the decree to determine whether it will be allowed to remain in force or not.

== Features ==
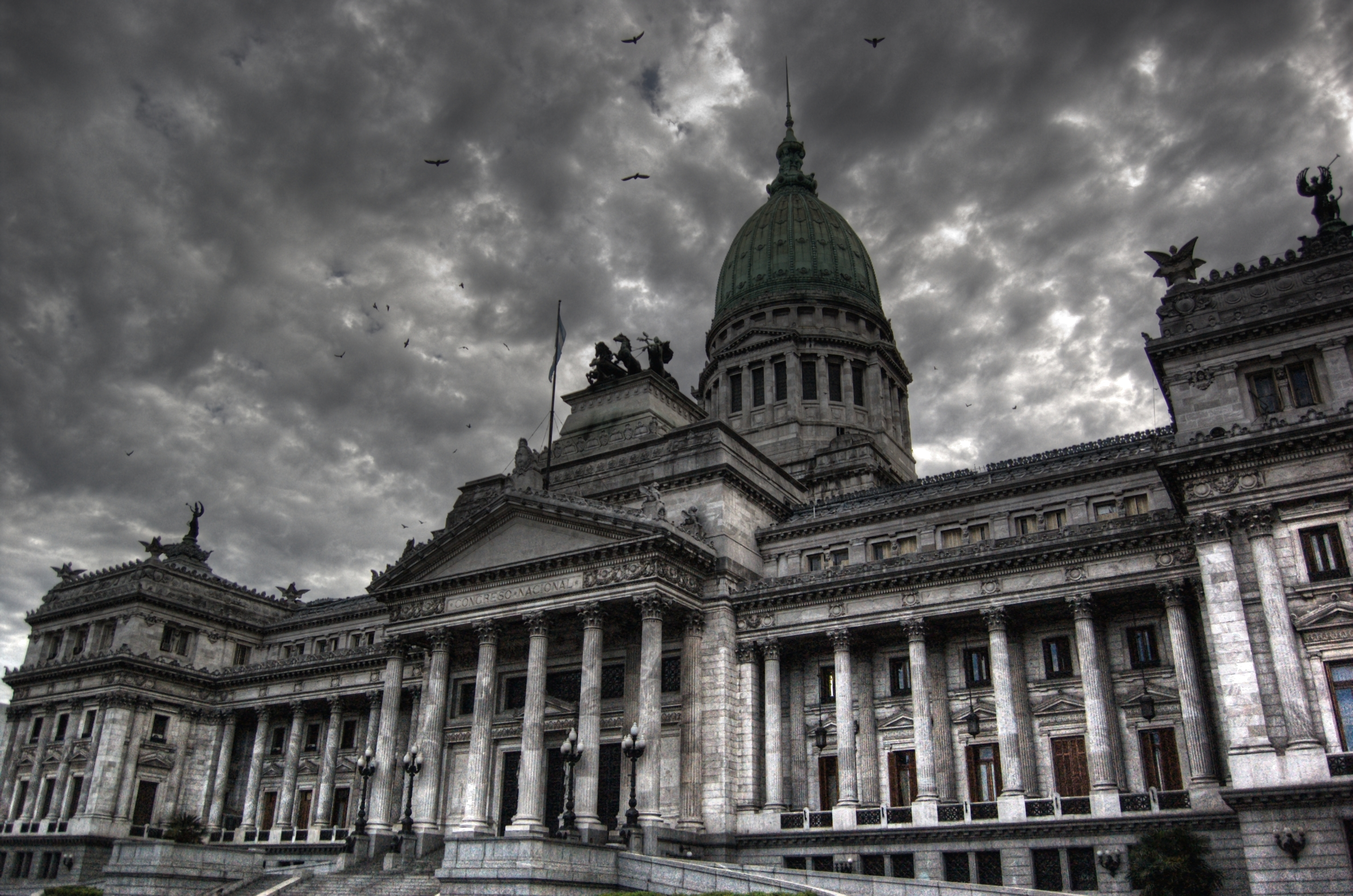
The Argentine National Congress must evaluate every Necessity and Urgency Decree.

The possibility to promulgate DNUs has been established in Article 99 of the Constitution of Argentina since 1994. As its name indicates, a Necessity and Urgency Decree is to be used only under exceptional situations, when it is not possible to follow the normal procedure to create laws in the Congress. There must be a "necessity" situation (the code specifies it as an overwhelming emergency) and "urgency" (when the emergency is so alarming that it needs a solution as quickly as possible). In addition, the President cannot issue DNUs concerning criminal, tax, or electoral matters.

As with regular decrees, Necessity and Urgency Decrees are promulgated by the President, but only with "General Agreement of Ministers" (Spanish: Acuerdo general de ministros). It means that all Ministers and the Chief of Staff must take part in the DNU's creation.

Once the Necessity and Urgency Decree is sanctioned, the Chief of Staff must send the DNU to the Permanent Bicameral Committee of the Congress in no more than ten days. Then, the Bicameral Committee delivers its report to the Chamber of Deputies and the Senate. The committee has also ten days to elaborate the report. During the entire process, the DNU is completely in force.

Each legislative chamber must deliver a resolution expressing its approval or rejection of the Necessity and Urgency Decree. If both chambers reject the DNU, it loses validity permanently. However, any rights acquired by people affected by the decree are not automatically terminated.

== Background ==
=== In military governments ===
All legislation issued by military dictatorships in Argentina was made by the executive. These kinds of orders were known as decree-law (Spanish: decreto ley). Under the self-called Argentine Revolution and the National Reorganization Process (the two latest military governments), the decree-laws were known simply as laws.

Because they were de facto governments, there was a legal controversy about the validity of decree-laws. In 1945, the Supreme Court of Argentina accepted them only if they were needed to fulfill the aims of the government. When the military government dissolved, and civilian rule was reestablished, the decree-laws were no longer valid unless the Congress ratified them.

In 1946, a new judgment by the Supreme Court established that decree-laws would remain valid after the end of the de facto government that promulgated them, and they could be abolished or modified in the same manner as other laws.

=== In constitutional governments ===
Although DNUs were introduced in their present form in the National Constitution in 1994, previous constitutional Presidents have used this type of decree. One example is the Austral Plan, which changed the national currency from the peso argentino to the Austral. This was sanctioned by President Raúl Alfonsín in 1985, using the decree 1096/85. Currently, Argentina uses the peso as its national currency.

In December 1990, the Supreme Court approved the sanction of the Necessity and Urgency Decree in the so-called Peralta Case, in which Luis Peralta requested to declare unconstitutional the decree 36/90, which President Menem promulgated in 1990. The judges of the Court eventually confirmed the validity of the DNU.

== Irregularities ==
Although the Constitution says Congress must create a special law to analyze Necessity and Urgency Decrees, this law was created in 2006, twelve years after the 1994 amendment of the Argentine Constitution, when the DNU were introduced. It means that all Presidents who ruled in this period (Carlos Menem, Fernando de la Rúa, Adolfo Rodríguez Saá, Eduardo Duhalde, and Néstor Kirchner) could issue DNUs with no legislative control.

In addition, there are DNUs that were created with no real need or urgency, such as the decrees that modify the Ministries Law to create new executive departments or Milei's decree renaming a cultural centre. The abuse of DNUs was also criticized.

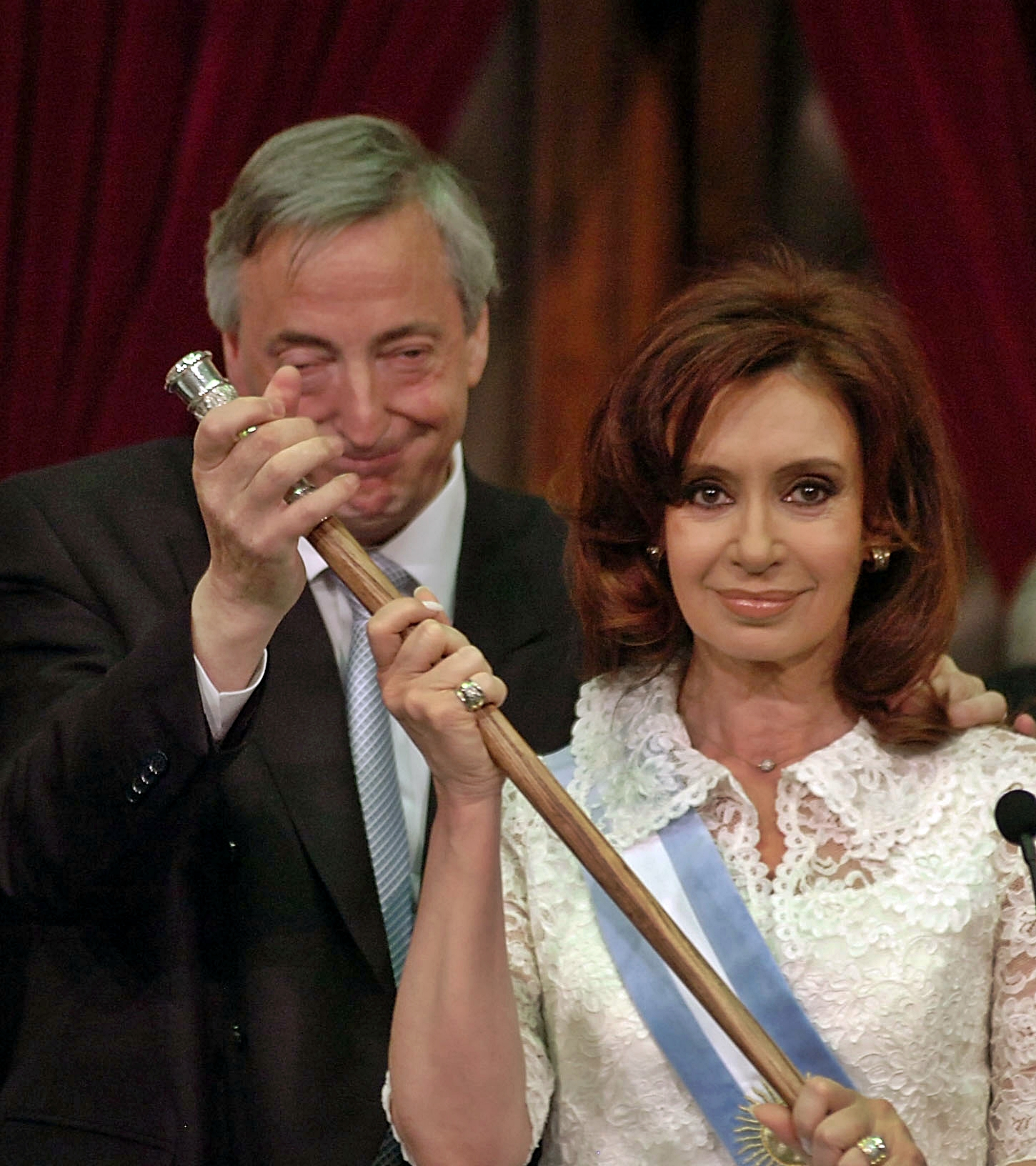
Former President Néstor Kirchner has the highest average of DNU per year. His wife, President Cristina Fernández, has the lowest average.

== Statistics since 1994 ==
Eduardo Duhalde, interim President between 2002 and 2003, was the President who signed more DNUs per year since the 1983 return to civilian rule. He promulgated 158 DNUs in one year. Those decrees were not checked by Congress.

Néstor Kirchner (2003–2007) promulgated 270 Necessity and Urgency Decrees in four and a half years. His DNUs released before 2006 were not controlled by Congress. His average is 60 Necessity and Urgency Decrees per year.

During the presidency of Carlos Menem (1989–1999), he signed 545 DNUs in ten years, or 54.5 per year. None of his Necessity and Urgency Decrees were analyzed by the legislative branch of the government.

In Fernando de la Rúa's two-year presidency (1999–2001), 73 special decrees were released. His average was thus 36.5 DNUs per year. The decrees signed by De la Rúa were not analyzed by the Bicameral Committee.

During the presidency of Cristina Fernández de Kirchner (2007–2015), she signed five Necessity and Urgency Decrees by March 2009. Subsequently, she issued three DNUs creating new ministries, another one creating a welfare plan, a decree to remove Martín Redrado as president of the Central Bank, and another three Necessity and Urgency Decrees related to the payment of public debt. The total number was 13 DNUs in her first three years of presidency, or four Necessity and Urgency Decrees per year.

== See also ==
- Executive Order (United States)
- Order in Council
- Provisional Measure
- Ordinance (India)
