= Javier González Fraga =

Argentine economist and businessman

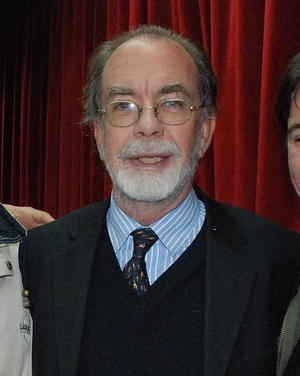

President of the Central Bank of Argentina
- In office June 13, 1990 – January 29, 1991
- President: Carlos Menem
- Preceded by: Antonio Erman González
- Succeeded by: Roque Fernández

President of the Central Bank of Argentina
- In office July 8, 1989 – November 24, 1989
- President: Carlos Menem
- Preceded by: Enrique García Vázquez
- Succeeded by: Egidio Iannella

Personal details
- Born: May 12, 1948 (age 78) Buenos Aires, Argentina
- Party: Radical Civic Union
- Other political affiliations: Cambiemos
- Education: Pontifical Catholic University of Argentina
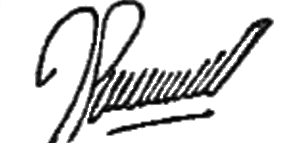
- Signature

Javier González Fraga (born May 12, 1948) is an Argentine economist and businessman. He served as President of the Central Bank of Argentina from 1989 to 1991, and was nominated as running-mate by Ricardo Alfonsín for his 2011 campaign for the Presidency.

== Life and times ==
González Fraga was born in Buenos Aires as the youngest of four children to Elvira Fraga and N. González Casartelli. He earned a degree in Economics with honors at the Pontifical Catholic University of Argentina, and in 1974, was brought on by La Nación, one of the nation's leading news dailies, as a financial columnist. He later earned a fellowship at the Belfer Center for Science and International Affairs at Harvard University, and at the London School of Economics. He married Bárbara Morea Giménez, and had two children; they later separated.

He established a dairy farm, La Salamandra, near Luján, Buenos Aires, in 1979, and continued to write on finance and economics, authoring El Mercado de Capitales (1982) and El Sistema Financiero (1980 and 1985). He served as adviser to the State enterprise bureau during the Raúl Alfonsín Administration, and was hired by BCCI principal Ghaith Pharaon to manage debt-equity swaps for the bank, as well as portfolio investments that included the Park Hyatt Buenos Aires.

=== Tenure at the Central Bank ===
The election of Justicialist Party candidate Carlos Menem in 1989, and his reliance on the agribusiness conglomerate Bunge & Born for economic policy during the presidential transition, gave the company's Chief Operating Officer, Orlando Ferreres, the power to choose most of the new administration's economic team. He recommended the relatively young González Fraga, who was well known to the local banking sector as a policy consultant, to be the new President of the Central Bank. The nominee informed the President-elect that he had not voted for him (harboring policy differences, as well, with Bunge & Born personnel); González Fraga, nevertheless, was sworn in with the new administration on July 8.

González Fraga leveraged business confidence in the new economic team to stabilize the highly undervalued austral, and despite favoring greater exchange rate flexibility in light of the critical need for foreign exchange reserves (which had declined to around us$120 million, with us$4.5 billion in arrears), González Fraga eliminated trade finance lines of credit and increased U.S. dollar purchases from exporters. These measures created friction with both the agricultural sector and Bunge & Born itself, though he continued to enjoy Menem's support.

The austral, which had fallen sharply (from 450 to 650 per dollar) in the days prior to Menem's July 8 inaugural in anticipation of a devaluation, stabilized. The financial crisis continued to exert pressure on prices, however, and monthly inflation reached 197% in July. The National Mint could not meet demand for banknotes, and in response, the new Central Bank President ordered the mint to triple production by printing higher denominations on old (circa-1980) Peso ley templates, and issuing bills printed on only one side. The crisis subsided in August, and by September, monthly inflation was in single digits. González Fraga, however, remained in strained terms with the Bunge & Born-dominated Economy Ministry, and sought as much independence for the Central Bank as possible. Ultimately, however, Economy Minister Néstor Rapanelli's opposition to González Fraga's call for a floating exchange rate led the central banker to resign on November 24. These news added to concerns that the us$2 billion in new portfolio investment envisaged in July failed to materialize, and amid a new currency crisis, Rapanelli himself resigned three weeks later.

Menem loyalist Antonio Erman González was named President of the Central Bank in March 1990, and González Fraga returned to the institution as its vice president. A reversal of the roles each had in 1989, this partnership continued when in June, he succeeded Erman González, while the latter retained the Economy Ministry. Even as the nation's finances stabilized, his agenda in the ensuing months was topped by difficult repayment negotiations over mounting foreign debt arrears (which had reached us$6 billion by then), as well as by ongoing investigations into securities fraud allegedly committed against the Central Bank by numerous institutions during the crisis. Revelations in January 1991 that Menem Administration officials had solicited bribes from beef processor Swift & Company, as well as a renewed currency crisis, led to the resignation of the entire economic team.

=== Later life ===
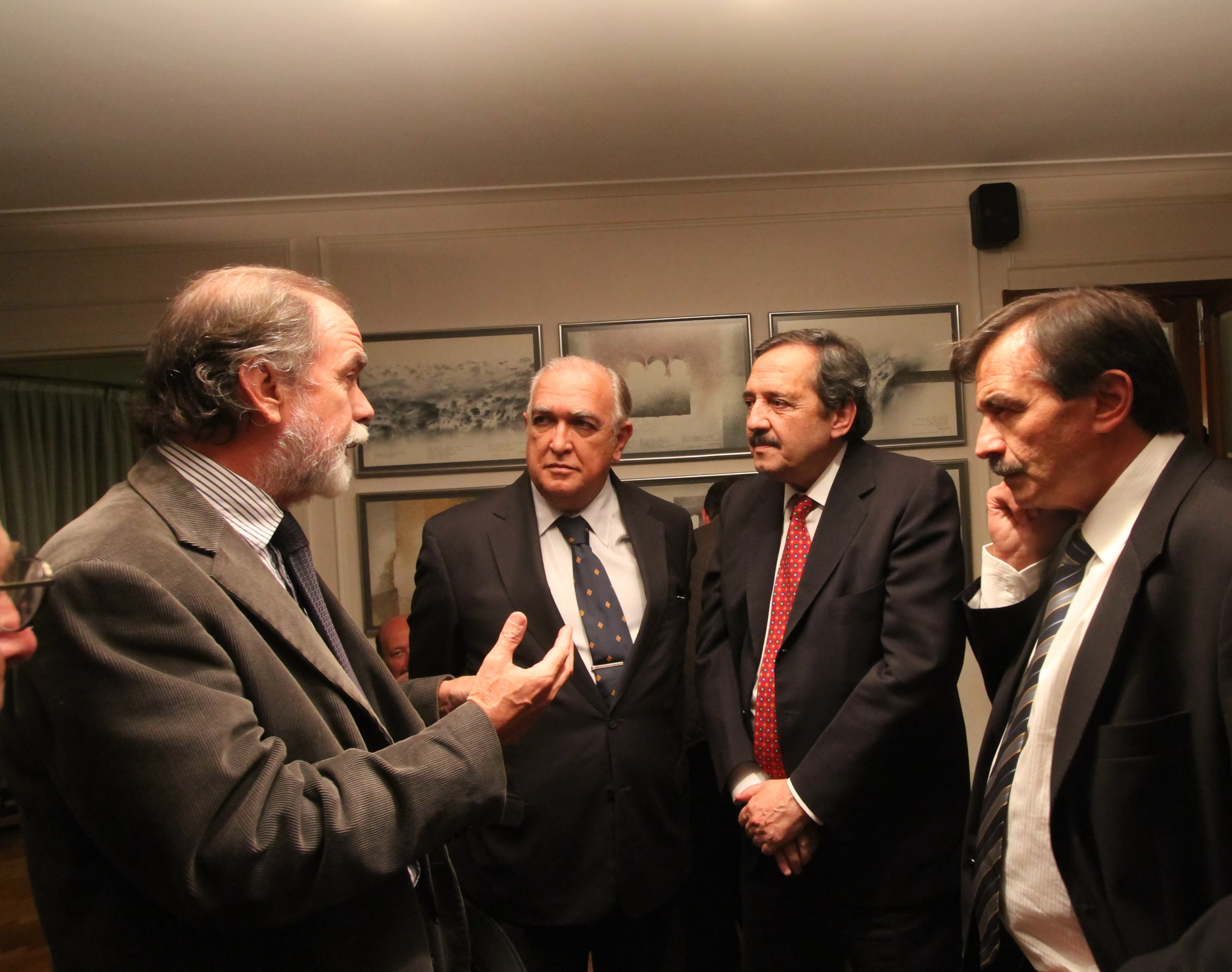
González Fraga in a conversation with (from left) Congressman Ricardo Gil Lavedra, UCR presidential candidate Ricardo Alfonsín, and Miguel Bazze of the Buenos Aires Province UCR during the 2011 elections.

González Fraga returned to the private sector. He was named Director of the Argentine Institute of Capital Markets, a think tank associated with the Buenos Aires Stock Exchange, and was later named Vice President of the Stock Exchange. He remained active as a dairy farmer. He established a manufacturing plant at La Salamandra in 1991, and introduced buffalo mozzarella to Argentina; La Salamandra's dulce de leche, a traditional Argentine confection, earned first place at the 2000 Fancy Food Show of New York.

He also returned to academia, and was given tenure as Professor of Economics at his alma mater in 1994. He earned a Konex Award for his role as an entrepreneur in 1998, and in 2004, was offered the post of Director of the National Arts Fund by President Néstor Kirchner; personal differences with actress Nacha Guevara, a key Kirchner supporter, stymied the appointment, however. González Fraga became known as one of the nation's foremost experts and proponents of Keynesian economics. He would influence a number of future policy makers in Argentina, including Martín Lousteau, with whom he wrote Sin Atajos ("Without Shortcuts") in 2005, and Débora Giorgi, who worked with González Fraga during his tenure at the Central Bank. He himself, however, never garnered an appointment to the powerful Economy Ministry, despite having been frequently considered for the post.

Close to important figures in both the center-left UCR and the center-right Federal Peronism, González Fraga was entrusted by UCR presidential nominee Ricardo Alfonsín to offer former Economy Minister Roberto Lavagna the vice-presidential slot for the 2011 elections; Lavagna reportedly instead persuaded González Fraga to run with Alfonsín, and on June 2, their UCR ticket was formally announced. They placed third with 11% of the vote.
