= Pignanelli =

Pignanelli is a surname. Notable people with the surname include:

- Aldo Pignanelli (1950–2019), Argentinian accountant and politician
- Frank R. Pignanelli, American politician
