= Roque Fernández =

Argentine economist

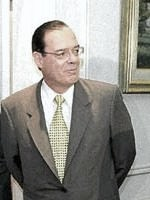

Minister of Economy of Argentina
- In office August 6, 1996 – December 10, 1999
- Preceded by: Domingo Cavallo
- Succeeded by: José Luis Machinea

President of the Central Bank of Argentina
- In office February 5, 1991 – August 4, 1996
- Preceded by: Javier González Fraga
- Succeeded by: Pedro Pou

Personal details
- Born: April 30, 1947 (age 79) Córdoba, Argentina
- Education: National University of Córdoba; University of Chicago

Roque Benjamín Fernández (born April 30, 1947) is an Argentine economist, former President of the Central Bank and Minister of Economy, and the only member of the Chicago Boys ever to have been the chief economic policy maker in Argentina.

He took part in Javier Milei's presidential campaign in 2023.

== Early years ==
Fernández was born in Córdoba, Argentina, and holds a CPA from the National University of Córdoba and a PhD in economics from the same university. In 1973 he obtained a scholarship from the Ford Foundation and went on to earn a PhD in economics from the University of Chicago in 1975.

== Academics ==
Since its foundation in 1978, he has been a member of the Board of Directors and Faculty of the Universidad del CEMA, where he taught monetary theory.

== Central Bank ==
Fernández was appointed president of the Central Bank of Argentina on February 5, 1991, by recommendation of the new Economy Minister, Domingo Cavallo.

As such, he was instrumental in managing the Argentine Currency Board that served as a guarantor of Cavallo's Convertibility Plan in its early years, and which helped maintain a 1:1 parity between the Argentine peso and the US dollar.

He remained at the post until August 4, 1996, when President Carlos Menem removed Cavallo following a political dispute, and Fernández became Minister of Economy on August 6, 1996, serving in that capacity until Menem's retirement on December 10, 1999.

== Minister of Economy ==
During his tenure, Fernández earned plaudits for helping maintain a steady exchange rate and zero inflation, and doing so despite repeated international shocks, such as the Mexican, Asian, and Russian financial crises.

== Return to academics ==
Fernández is currently professor of macroeconomic analysis (graduate) and macroeconomics I (undergraduate) at University of CEMA. He was also visiting professor in the University of Southern California, Florida International University, University of Chile, Pontifical Catholic University of Chile, and has worked as a consultant and economist for the World Bank and the International Monetary Fund.

His major areas of interest are banks, financial systems in developing nations, fiscal and monetary policy, exchange rate policy, balance of payments and financial crisis.

As a researcher, he is author of several books and publications, including articles in the American Economic Review and Journal of Political Economy. He is a member of the Academia Nacional de Ciencias Economicas.

== See also ==
- Universidad del CEMA
- Economic history of Argentina
- Chicago School of Economics

Preceded by Javier González Fraga	President of the Central Bank of Argentina; 1991–1996	Succeeded by Pedro Pou
Preceded by Domingo Cavallo	Minister of Economy; 1996–1999	Succeeded by José Luis Machinea
