= Ernesto Bosch =

Argentine lawyer, diplomat and politician

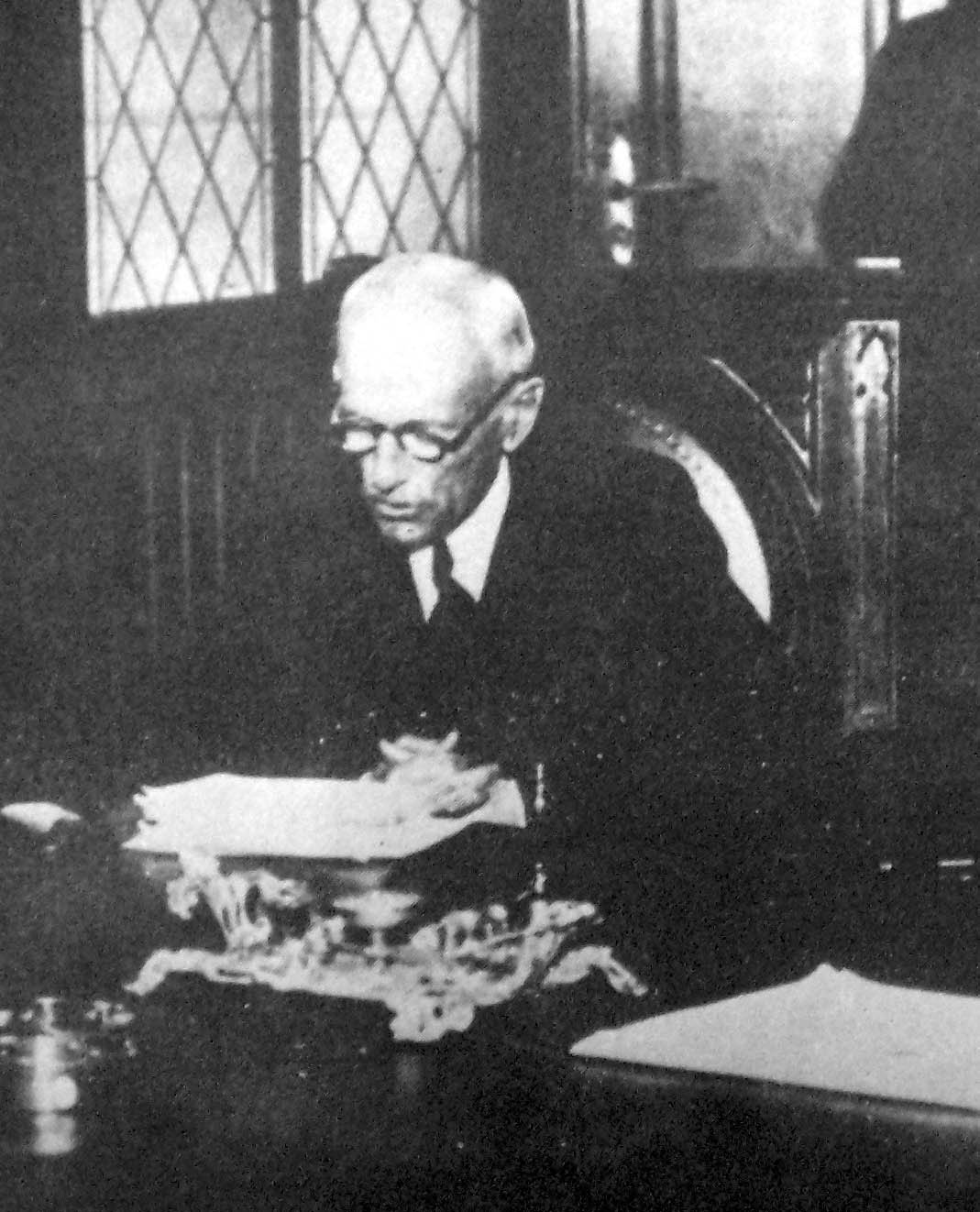

President of the Central Bank of Argentina
- In office 31 May 1935 – 18 September 1945
- Preceded by: post created
- Succeeded by: Vicente Casares

Minister of Foreign Affairs
- In office 6 September 1930 – 9 October 1931
- President: José Félix Uriburu
- Preceded by: Horacio Oyhanarte
- Succeeded by: Adolfo Bioy
- In office 17 December 1910 – 16 February 1914
- President: Roque Sáenz Peña
- Preceded by: Epifanio Portela
- Succeeded by: José Luis Murature

Personal details
- Born: January 8, 1863 Buenos Aires
- Died: August 22, 1951 (aged 88) Buenos Aires
- Spouse: Elisa de Alvear
- Education: University of Buenos Aires

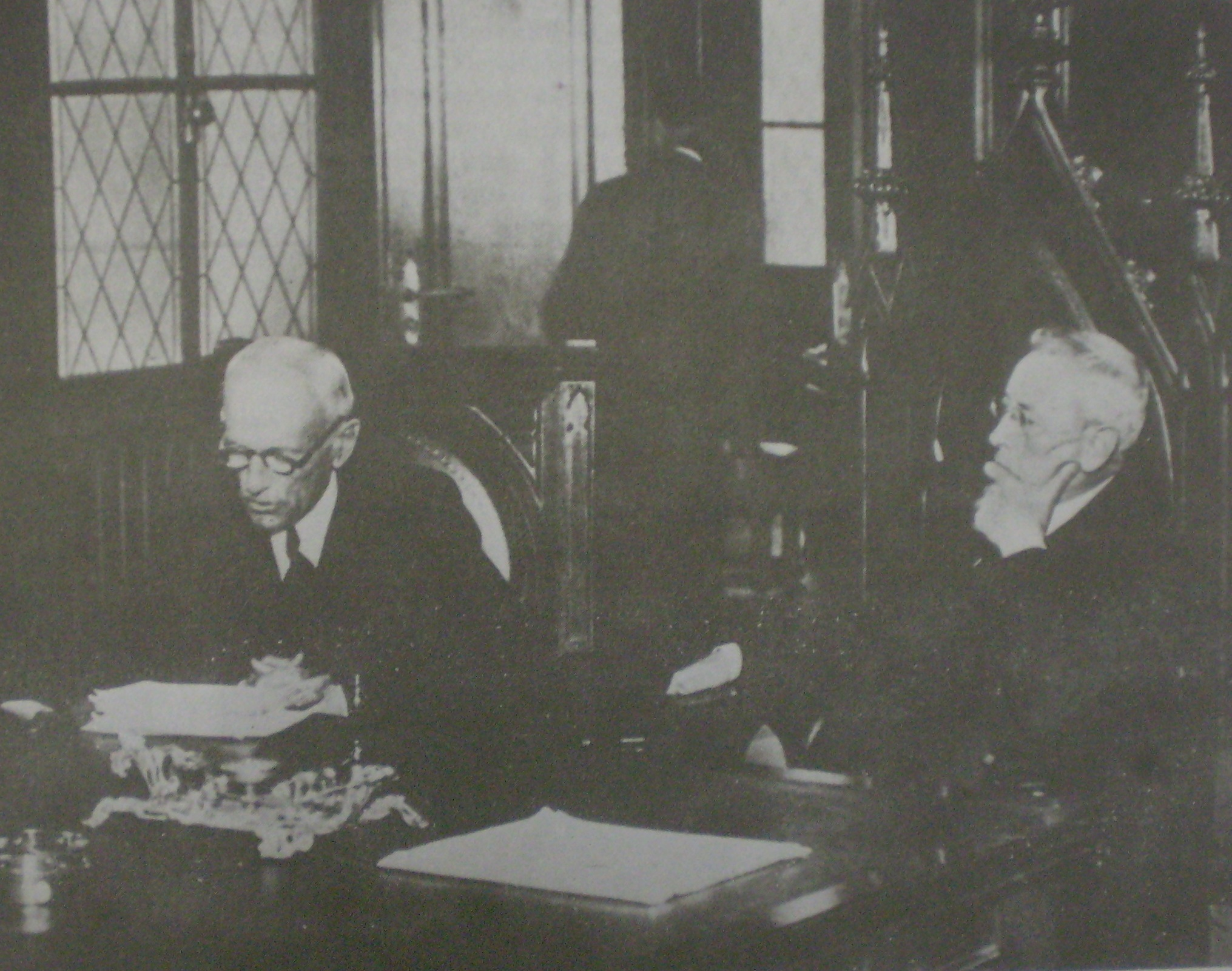
Ernesto Bosch (left) and fellow UBA Law School alumnus José Nicolás Matienzo confer in the Law School auditorium in 1930.

Ernesto Bosch (January 8, 1863 – August 22, 1951) was a prominent Argentine landowner, lawyer, and diplomat who served as the first President of the Central Bank of Argentina.

== Life and times ==
=== Early life and career ===
Ernesto Mauricio Bosch Peña was born to Rosario Peña and Francisco Bosch in Buenos Aires, in 1863. Raised in privileged circumstances, he enrolled at the University of Buenos Aires and earned a juris doctor in 1889; his thesis dealt with life insurance. Bosch married Elisa María de Alvear, with whom he had nine children.

He cultivated an interest in international law, and upon graduation, was appointed Secretary of Legation in the Argentine Embassy in Paris. He served in the same capacity in Berlin, and in 1894 was named Chargé d'affaires in the United States; in this capacity Bosch helped secure Argentina's position as an ally to the latter nation. He returned to his country in 1898, and was appointed Federal Interventor (Receiver) of San Luis Province, then in the throes of separatist sentiment. Bosch served as Administrator of the Postal and Telegraph Service in 1904, and in 1905, he was named Ambassador to France.

=== Foreign minister ===
He remained in Paris in that post until, in 1910, newly elected President Roque Sáenz Peña appointed Bosch Minister of Foreign Relations. A colleague of Sáenz Peña, who had served as Ambassador to Italy until his election, Bosch implemented the President's Eurocentric foreign policy, while advancing efforts to coordinate a policy of mutual conflict resolution in Latin America, and he joined the Foreign Ministers of Brazil and Chile in discussions from 1912 onwards for the creation of a tri-national agency to that effect.

President Sáenz Peña's failing health, and the unofficial assumption of presidential duties by Vice President Victorino de la Plaza led Bosch to resign on February 16, 1914. The alliance he and Sáenz Peña sought became reality shortly afterwards, however, when the Veracruz Incident in April prompted the first ABC Powers Conference in a bid by the three countries to mediate the United States dispute with Mexico.

His return to Argentina, and his years in Paris also inspired the Bosches to have a home built in Buenos Aires to evoke their days in the French capital. He commissioned French architect René Sergent in 1910 to design a mansion in the Palermo section of Buenos Aires, and contracted the Parisian interior designer André Carlhian and landscaper Charles Thays. Completed in 1917, the Bosch Palace later became of interest to U.S. Ambassador Robert Woods Bliss during a reception there in his honor, and in 1929, was sold by the Bosches to the U.S. State Department for use as the Ambassador's residence for around US$3 million.

The September 1930 coup against President Hipólito Yrigoyen resulted in Bosch's reappointment as Foreign Minister by General José Félix Uriburu. Bosch enjoyed cordial relations with the U.S. government, which supported the influential Standard Oil in its dispute with the deposed Yrigoyen over the latter's oil policy. Bosch resigned on October 9, 1931, to direct the panel that drafted Argentina's proposal at the World Disarmament Conference of 1932.

=== Central Bank President ===
The Roca-Runciman Treaty of 1933 and the resulting abandonment of the Caja de conversión governing monetary policy since 1890 led to the formation of the Central Bank of Argentina on May 28, 1935, upon which Bosch was named its first president; completing a seven-year term, he was reconfirmed in 1942. His upholding treaty obligations to deposit World War II era trade surpluses in the Bank of England ran counter to nationalist policies advanced by the powerful Vice President, Juan Perón, and Bosch was dismissed in 1945; his tenure, marked by a stable peso, would remain the longest in the Central Bank's history to date.

Ernesto Bosch died in Buenos Aires on August 22, 1951; he was 88.
