= Juan Carlos Fábrega =

Argentine banker

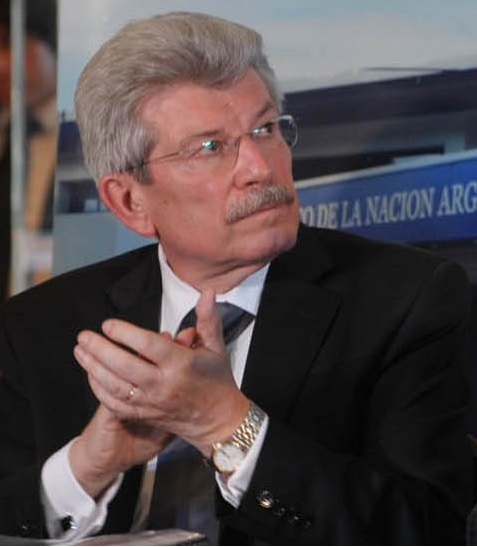
- Fábrega in 2013

President of the Central Bank of Argentina
- In office November 18, 2013 – October 1, 2014
- Preceded by: Mercedes Marcó del Pont
- Succeeded by: Alejandro Vanoli

Personal details
- Born: January 10, 1949 (age 77) Province of Mendoza
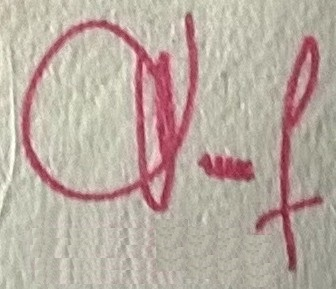
- Signature

Juan Carlos Fábrega (born January 10, 1949) is an Argentine banker. He does not have a university degree, and worked at Banco Nación for 45 years. He was appointed president of the Central Bank of Argentina in November 2013, by president Cristina Fernández de Kirchner. On October 1, 2014, he resigned his office.
