= Alejandro Vanoli =

Argentine economist and public official

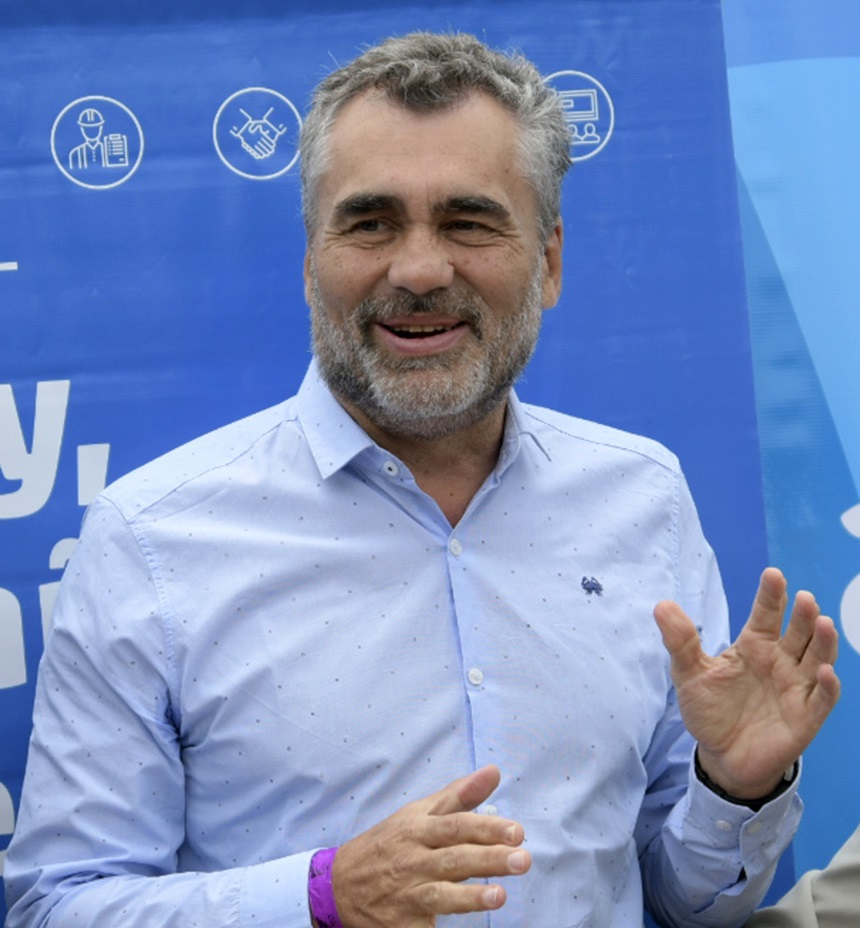
- Vanoli in 2020, while heading ANSES

President of the Central Bank of Argentina
- In office 1 October 2014 – 10 December 2015
- President: Cristina Fernández de Kirchner
- Preceded by: Juan Carlos Fábrega
- Succeeded by: Federico Sturzenegger

President of the National Securities Commission
- In office 19 November 2009 – 1 October 2014
- Preceded by: Eduardo Hecker
- Succeeded by: Cristian Girard

Executive Director of the National Social Security Administration
- In office 10 December 2019 – 30 April 2020
- President: Alberto Fernández
- Preceded by: Emilio Basavilbaso
- Succeeded by: María Fernanda Raverta

Personal details
- Born: April 10, 1961 (age 65) Buenos Aires, Argentina
- Education: University of Buenos Aires

Alejandro Vanoli (born 10 April 1961) is an Argentine economist and public official, He was the former President of the Central Bank of Argentina.

== Biography ==
Vanoli was born in Buenos Aires in 1961. He was raised in the city's Palermo district and attended high school in the Colegio Nacional de Buenos Aires. He later enrolled at the University of Buenos Aires and earned a degree in Economics in 1987, following which he spent a year as a teaching assistant in the School of Economics' Department of Economic Development under Professor Pedro Paz. Vanoli and his wife are separated; the couple has three children.

His work experience in the public sector began in July 1988 as Assistant Division Head in the Central Bank's Office of Management of External Debt, where he also served as a senior analyst. He joined the Ministry of Economics' National Bureau of Public Credit in 1992, and remained there until 2000. Vanoli began a long career at the National Securities Commission (CNV) in 2000 as chief adviser to the head of the agency at the time, Carlos Weitz. He returned to the Central Bank in 2002 as adviser to the Board of Governors member Arturo O'Connell, and in October 2006, when Eduardo Hecker was named president of the CNV, Vanoli was appointed as its vice president. Hecker ultimately resigned in November 2009 over differences with the powerful Commerce Secretary at the time, Guillermo Moreno, and Vanoli thus became President of the CNV.

Vanoli's tenure at the National Securities Commission was marked by a sustained growth in Buenos Aires Stock Exchange prices, as well as by numerous regulatory reforms. The most meaningful of these was the Capital Markets Reform Law of 2012, which sought to strengthen the CNV's watchdog role over rating agencies, IPOs, and mutualization (formerly left to private sector operators). The computer systems among the nation's several stock and commodity exchanges were integrated during Vanoli's tenure, with monitoring efforts shared with state-funded public universities and results made freely available to investors. The exchange of information between the CNV, Economy Ministry, Central Bank, AFIP tax agency, and the Superintendent of Insurance was likewise mandated as a deterrent against money laundering and other illicit financial activities. Following these reforms the Financial Action Task Force removed Argentina from its “gray list” in October 2014, noting significant progress in these areas.

== President of Central Bank of Argentina ==
Alejandro Vanoli was appointed President of the Central Bank on October 1, 2014, replacing Juan Carlos Fábrega. Vanoli was the only President of the Central Bank of Argentina who previously become of the staff of the Central Bank, since 1988.

During the Vanoli administration, the inflation rate fell 12 percentage points in a context of recovery of GDP growth that reached 2.4% per year in 2015, following the rise in inflation and recession in early 2014, prior to the arrival of Vanoli to the Central Bank. Under Vanoli chairmanship, the dollar fell sharply in the illegal market and the dollar was liquidated both by stimulus to savings in domestic currency and by greater supervision on the foreign exchange market.

Although Alejandro Vanoli had a mandate with the Senate's agreement until December 2019, he resigned on December 9, 2015 at the end of the presidency of Cristina Fernández de Kirchner.

== Present ==
He is currently a university professor and international consultant in economics and international finance and Director of Synthesis Argentina.
