= Augusto Fraga =

Portuguese film director

- Born: Augusto Fraga; 10 September 1910; Lisbon, Portugal
- Died: 6 January 2000 (aged 89); Lisbon, Portugal

Augusto Fraga (9 October 1910 – 6 January 2000), born in Lisbon, was a Portuguese film director.

During the 1930s, Fraga was a journalist, a critic and a cinematographic illustrator. He was also director of the magazine Cinéfilo from 1938 to 1939 and collaborated in the creation of Animatograph and World Graphic. In the following decade, he was editor of The Century until it closed and also of the supplement Success from the Lisbon Agenda.

Fraga was a particularly hostile critic towards Nazi Germany's attempts at propaganda towards neutral Italy during World War II. This particularly focused on criticism of editing film that had been taken in a non-believable fashion, to the point that even a casual film-goer would be able to identify the changes.

Between 1948 and 1949 Fraga made short films in Spain as well as being a screenwriter. He would shift these professions to the radio in the 1950s. His two most successful films are O Tarzan do 5º Esquerdo and Sangue Toureiro.

== Filmography ==
- Traição Inverosímil - 1970
- As Ilhas do Meio do Mundo (Documentary) - 1966
- A Voz do Sangue - 1965
- Vinte E Nove Irmãos - 1964
- ABC a Preto E Branco (Short Documentary) - 1964
- Uma Hora de Amor - 1962
- Um Dia de Vida - 1961
- Angola (Documentary) - 1961
- Raça - 1961
- Terra Ardente (Documentary) - 1960
- Terra Mãe (Documentary) - 1960
- O Passarinho da Ribeira - 1958
- Prisões de Vidro (Documentary) - 1958
- O Tarzan do 5º Esquerdo - 1958
- Sangue Toureiro - 1958
- Paisagem Atlântica (Documentary) - 1947
- Fado do Emigrante (Documentary) - 1940
