= Antonio Erman González =

Argentine politician

Antonio Erman González (16 May 1935 – 2 February 2007) was an Argentine politician. He occupied many charges during the presidency of Carlos Menem, like Minister of Economy, Minister of Health, Minister of Defense, Minister of Labour and President of Central Bank of Argentina. He also was National Deputy for Buenos Aires district and Ambassador of Argentina in Italy.

Born in La Rioja Province, Erman González received his CPA from the National University of Córdoba in 1960.

He was a close friend of president Menem and was accused on an arms trafficking scandal and was arrested once on these charges.
