= Jay Fraga =

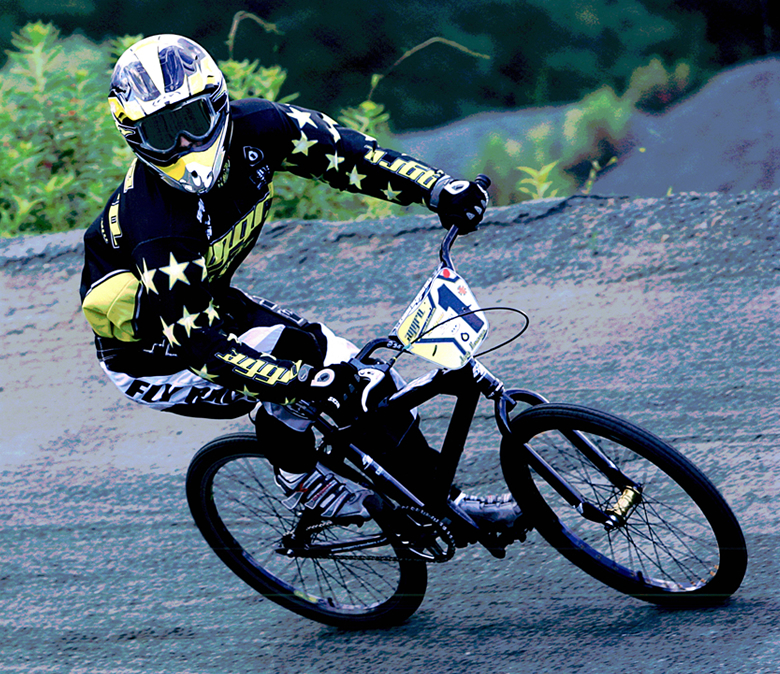

Personal information
- Full name: Jason R Fraga
- Nickname: Jay
- Born: 1972 (age 53–54) Northampton, MA
- Height: 5 ft 8 in (173 cm)
- Weight: 155 lb (70 kg)

Cycling career
- Sport: Cycling
- Current team: Retired
- Discipline: BMX Racing
- Role: Rider / Team Manager

Amateur teams
- 1982-1988: Privateer
- 2003-2010: Aggro Bikes

Jason R. "Jay" Fraga (born 1972, Massachusetts) is an American speaker, activist, and former BMX racer.

Jay is the founder and executive director of The Knockout Project. He is an outspoken advocate on the topic of concussion education, having sustained multiple concussions. He suffers from post-concussion syndrome.

Fraga argues that concussed athletes are unable to judge the severity of their own injuries and need oversight from medically-qualified sideline observers.
