= Santiago Bausili =

Argentine economist (born 1974)

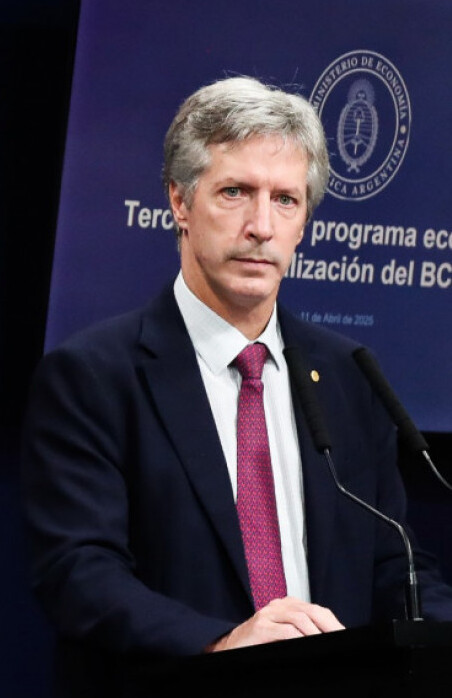
Santiago Bausili

Santiago Bausili (born 18 February 1974) is an Argentine economist and the current President of the Central Bank of Argentina.

== Biography ==
He was born in Buenos Aires and attended Colegio Cardenal Newman.

He earned his degree in Economics from the University of San Andrés in 1995. He began his career at JPMorgan in New York in 1996. Between 1998 and 2007, he served as vice president of JPMorgan’s stock exchange sector for Argentina, China, and Peru. During this period, he met Luis Caputo, who became a close friend. He later worked at Deutsche Bank as a managing director, overseeing the debt operations of several South American countries.

His first job in the public sector was under Caputo at the Secretariat of Finance of Argentina, where he served as Deputy Secretary of Financing in 2015. In 2017, after Caputo left the position of Secretary of Finance, Bausili succeeded him and held the post until 2019.

In December 2023, President Javier Milei appointed him President of the Central Bank of Argentina, on Caputo’s recommendation.
