= Martín Redrado =

Argentine economist

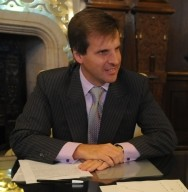
- Born: Martín Redrado; September 10, 1961 (age 65); Buenos Aires, Argentina
- Education: University of Buenos Aires Harvard University
- Employers: President of the Central Bank of Argentina. Fundación Capital. Asia Business School. Florida International University.
- Partner: María Luján Sanguinetti
- Children: Tómas, Martina
- Website: https://martinredrado.com.ar

Martín Redrado (born September 10, 1961) is an Argentine economist. He served as President of the Central Bank between 2004 and 2010.

== Early life and career ==
Born Martín Pérez in Buenos Aires in 1961, he enrolled at the University of Buenos Aires and received a Bachelor of Arts in Economics. He joined U.S. economist Jeffrey Sachs as part of his advisory board, which had been invited by Bolivian president Víctor Paz Estenssoro in 1985 to implement a restructuring the stabilization plan of the Bolivian economy, then in crisis.

He earned a master's degree in public administration from Harvard University, and was brought on by the Wall Street investment firm Salomon Brothers, where he served as adviser on their handling of the privatizations of British Airways, British Gas plc and the French Compagnie Financière de Suez, during the late 1980s. In 1989, he was appointed Vice President for Latin America at Los Angeles-based Security Pacific Bank until 1991, in which capacity he oversaw the profit sharing plan for Enersis employees, and advised on the privatization of Telmex.

He returned to Argentina in July 1991 because he was appointed President of the National Securities Commission (CNV) by President Carlos Menem. He arrived a few months after Economy Minister Domingo Cavallo, had just implemented his Convertibility Plan and a far-reaching deregulation program. Coupled with the 1990 launch of an ambitious privatization program, these measures found Redrado overseeing a Buenos Aires Stock Exchange whose daily trading volume had risen around 20-fold within months. He was responsible for modernizing the local capital market, creating new financing instruments and integrating to the world markets. In 1992, he was elected by his world peers as Chairman of the Emerging Markets Committee of the International Organization of Securities Commissions. In May 1994 he moved to the private sector where he established Fundación Capital, a think tank.

Redrado was selected as one of the "100 Leaders for the Next Millennium" by Time Magazine's International Edition in 1994, and he returned to public service as Secretary of Technological Education, in 1996. He was offered to run for a seat in the newly created Buenos Aires City Legislature in 1997, but was he declined to continue his career as a public servant , and he left the secretariat in 1998 to lead Trident Investment Group, a local venture capital firm specializing in health care.

The advent of the dot-com boom led Redrado to launch of InvertirOnline.com in June 2000; the fledgling firm prospered despite the ensuing local financial crisis, and handled over 20,000 accounts by 2003. After the debt crisis of 2001, Redrado was named Secretary of Trade and International Economics by President Eduardo Duhalde in January 2002. In September of that year he was appointed Secretary of Foreign Affairs, thus becoming the Deputy Foreign Minister of Argentina. He was reappointed in the same post by Duhalde's successor, President Néstor Kirchner.

Redrado has also published six books on the subject of contemporary economics and current affairs: Tiempos de desafíos (Challenging Times, 1995),Cómo sobrevivir a la globalización (How to Survive Globalization, 1999), and Exportar para crecer (Exporting for Growth, 2003). 2010 "Sin Reservas: Un límite al poder absoluto" publisher=Planeta. This book was translated and published by Amazon Crossing with a foreword by Alan Greenspan, former Chairman of the Federal Reserve. In 2015 he published "Las Cuentas Pendientes" publisher=Planeta with foreword of former Economy Minister Roberto Lavagna (Argentina). In 2021 his last release was "Argentina Primero: Poner en marcha el país tras la pandemia". Publisher Penguin Random House.

== Central Bank presidency ==
Kirchner nominated Redrado President of the Central Bank of Argentina on September 24, 2004 and was approved by unanimous vote by the Senate with a legal mandate for six years. The new central banker implemented the administration's policy of keeping a competitive local currency, while foreign exchange reserves soared to nearly US$50 billion. In 2008, he was elected by his peers central bankers as chairman of the committee for the America’s at the Bank for international Settlements (Basel)

Fallout from the international, 2008 financial crisis later forced the Argentine government to seek domestic financing for growing public spending, as well as for foreign debt service obligations. The president ordered a US$6.7 billion account opened at the Central Bank for the latter purpose in December 2009, implying the use of foreign exchange reserves, and drawing direct opposition from Redrado. Following an impasse, he was dismissed by presidential decree on January 7, 2010. He was reinstated by the judicial power by the court led by judge Maria José Sarmiento. After presenting his case to the senate, he presented his resignation on January 29, 2010.

=== Resignation and controversy ===
Central Bank Vice President Miguel Ángel Pesce became the institution's interim head. Redrado's resignation however, triggered a vocal rebuke from opposition figures in Congress, who, citing the need to preserve the Central Bank's independence, expressed doubts as to the decree's legality.

The legitimacy of President Cristina Kirchner's policy decision to set aside a portion of the Central Bank's reserves through a Necessity and Urgency Decree was itself questioned by several opposition figures, who argued that the reserves can be only used to keep the value of currency and not for commercial purposes, that the Central Bank is independent, and that only Congress can bypass it through a law. The decree, moreover, may not meet a threshold of "necessity" and "urgency" required by the Constitution of Argentina for its enactment.

After his resignation, he was prosecuted by Cristina Kirchner´s administration under the charge that he did not abide by the commitments of a public servant. He was defended in court by Jorge Valerga Aroaz (a Former Judge of the Military Juntas). He was later acquitted. In 2011 he was called upon by the General Director of The World Trade Organization (WTO) in Geneva to become member of the Dispute Settlement Body. Among the various cases where Mr. Redrado worked was a controversy between China and the United States for the provision of financial services in the Asian country.

In 2012, he founded “Apeiron Capital Markets”, an Investment Bank focused in developing business opportunities for investors in Latin America. That year he also returned to direct “Fundación Capital” after the last CEO, Carlos Palliordet decided to continue his career in London.

In 2016 he was called upon by the World Bank to work as Senior Economic Adviser to the Finance Department. A year later, the governor of “Bank Negara” (main Sponsor) called upon him to direct the masters in Central Banking in the Asia Business School in Kuala Lumpur.

At the end of 2022, he was appointed Secretary of Strategic Affairs for the City of Buenos Aires. In this capacity he developed four key areas: 1. Financing of Infrastructure Projects by multilateral organizations. 2. Layout for electromobility in the transport of the city. 3. Technological education for the knowledge economic sector 4. Export opportunities for the industries of the city of Buenos Aires.

Recently he was named Visiting Professor in Florida International University with wide responsibilities for teaching Macroeconomics in emerging markets and doing research on National Security and the Economy for the Americas.
