= Lorenzo Sigaut =

Argentine economist

Lorenzo Juan Sigaut (born 6 June 1933) is an Argentine economist.

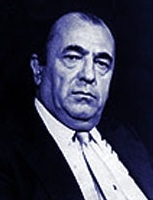
Lorenzo Sigaut

== Minister of Economy ==
He served as Minister of Economy of Argentina from April to December 1981, during the dictatorship of Roberto Eduardo Viola.

His term in office was marked by high inflation, external debt crisis and capital flight, that provoked an economic crisis which resulted in his replacement by Roberto Alemann.

His infamous quote "Anybody who bets on the dollar will lose" (El que apueste al dólar perderá), referring to those who had savings in United States dollars, became the laughing stock of Argentine economists for decades.

== Bibliography ==
- Gerchunoff, Pablo; Llach, Juan (1998). El ciclo de la ilusión y el desencanto: un siglo de políticas económicas argentinas. Buenos Aires: Ariel. pp. 373–379. ISBN 950-9122-57-2. (in Spanish)
