= Aldo Pignanelli =

Argentinian accountant and politician (1950–2019)

Aldo Rubén Pignanelli (24 April 1950 – 15 June 2019) was an Argentine accountant, and politician of the Justicialist Party. He was President of the Central Bank of Argentina between June and December 2002, when Eduardo Duhalde was president of the country.
