= Historical exchange rates of Argentine currency =

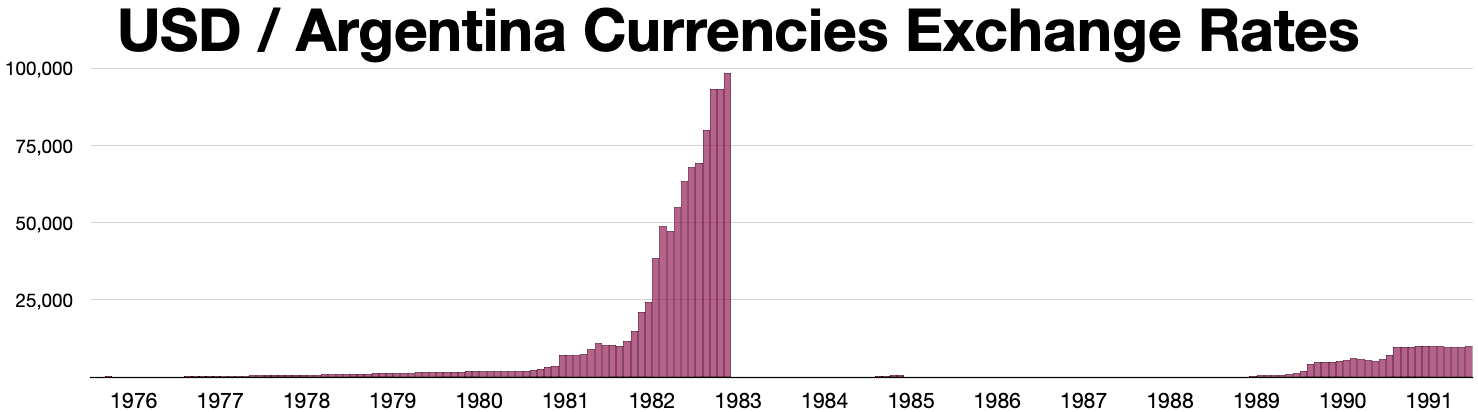
USD to Argentine peso exchange rates, 1976–1991

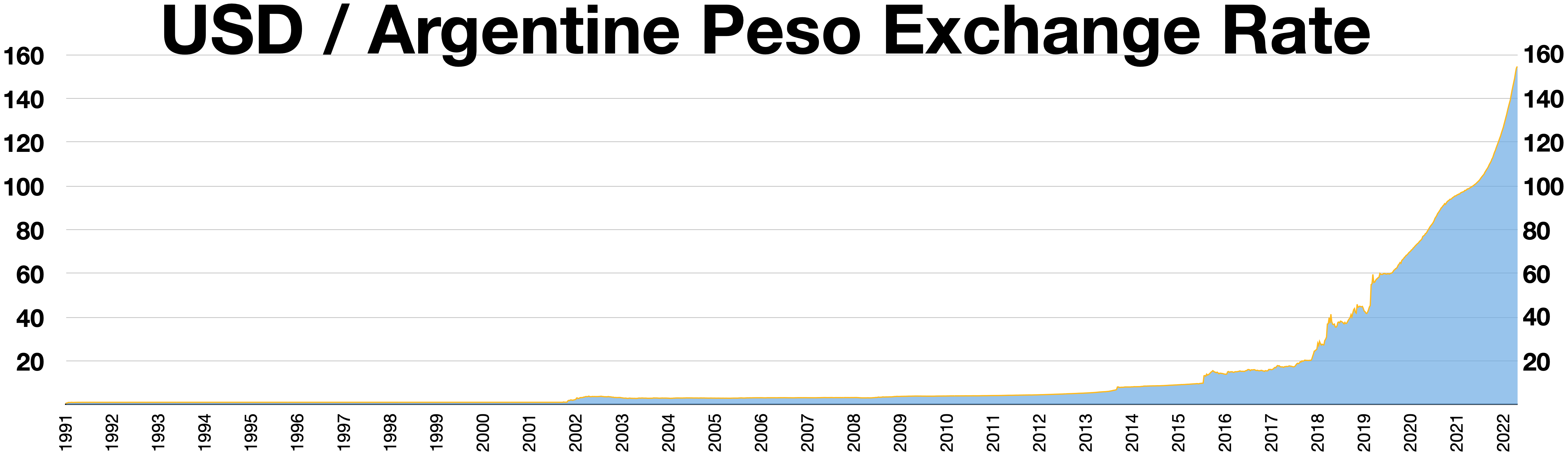
USD to Argentine peso exchange rate, 1991–2022

The following table contains the monthly historical exchange rate of the different currencies of Argentina, expressed in Argentine currency units per United States dollar. The exchange rate at the end of each month is expressed in:

- January 1914 – December 1969: peso moneda nacional
- January 1970 – May 1983: peso ley
- June 1983 – May 1985: peso argentino
- June 1985 – December 1991: austral
- January 1992 – present: peso

Historical exchange rates of Argentine currency
Year	Jan	Feb	Mar	Apr	May	Jun	Jul	Aug	Sep	Oct	Nov	Dec
1914	2.3693	2.3750	2.3512	2.3602	2.3682	2.3682	2.3659					
1915	2.3636	2.3661	2.3795	2.3800	2.3815	2.3893	2.4055	2.4502	2.4489	2.4173	2.4143	2.3957
1916	2.3850	2.3732	2.3600	2.3614	2.3711	2.3743	2.4002	2.4152	2.3766	2.3361	2.3161	2.2761
1917	2.2893	2.2750	2.3014	2.3425	2.3095	2.2818	2.2959	2.3232	2.3325	2.2877	2.1918	2.1455
1918	2.2455	2.2855	2.2732	2.2475	2.2241	2.2377	2.2527	2.2564	2.2443	2.2364	2.2350	2.2223
1919	2.2323	2.2336	2.2527	2.2723	2.2611	2.3118	2.3516	2.3725	2.3616	2.3611	2.3305	2.3205
1920	2.3209	2.3155	2.3170	2.3295	2.3575	2.3830	2.4961	2.6407	2.7141	2.8145	2.9898	2.9282
1921	2.8966	2.8614	2.9327	3.1205	3.2268	3.3048	3.4541	3.4118	3.2589	3.1141	3.0866	3.0273
1922	2.9398	2.7550	2.7441	2.8157	2.7568	2.7730	2.7745	2.7668	2.8030	2.7870	2.7559	2.6525
1923	2.6805	2.6955	2.6984	2.7380	2.7845	2.8212	2.9273	3.0582	3.0348	3.0864	3.1986	3.1414
1924	3.0816	2.9684	2.9727	3.0439	3.0420	3.0722	3.0623	2.9577	2.8368	2.7177	2.6555	2.5682
1925	2.4934	2.5159	2.5361	2.6189	2.5168	2.4911	2.4770	2.4789	2.4766	2.4330	2.4061	2.4125
1926	2.4134	2.4395	2.5184	2.5023	2.4923	2.4805	2.4670	2.4734	2.4636	2.4509	2.4602	2.4355
1927	2.4225	2.3950	2.3650	2.3611	2.3614	2.3557	2.3539	2.3452	2.3407	2.3402	2.3441	2.3409
1928	2.3429	2.3418	2.3398	2.3418	2.3523	2.3491	2.3691	2.3743	2.3800	2.3793	2.3732	2.3768
1929	2.3750	2.3764	2.3809	2.3791	2.3834	2.3880	2.3841	2.3823	2.3839	2.3934	2.4207	2.4457
1930	2.4945	2.6386	2.6623	2.5745	2.6068	2.7016	2.7784	2.7614	2.7886	2.9218	2.9120	3.0216
1931	3.2655	3.1539	2.9089	2.9930	3.2232	3.2370	3.2609	3.5284	3.8155	4.2636	3.8975	3.8863
1932	3.8863	3.8863	3.8863	3.8863	3.8863	3.8863	3.8863	3.8863	3.8863	3.8863	3.8863	3.8863
1933	3.8863	3.8863	3.9191	3.7655	3.3614	3.2227	2.8443	2.8786	2.7555	2.6639	2.4973	3.2079
1934	3.2528	3.3117	3.3565	3.3227	3.4132	3.4444	3.4560	3.4080	3.4314	3.4517	3.4217	3.4527
1935	3.4735	3.4731	3.5375	3.4972	3.4702	3.4401	3.4306	3.4233	3.4488	3.4652	3.4530	3.4504
1936	3.4257	3.3994	3.4173	3.4359	3.4159	3.3872	3.3935	3.3888	3.3627	3.4587	3.4673	3.3098
1937	3.3058	3.3289	3.3303	3.2983	3.2950	3.2908	3.3121	3.3164	3.3389	3.3482	3.3782	3.4044
1938	3.4198	3.7606	3.9035	3.9026	3.8238	3.8395	3.8444	3.8759	3.9543	3.9823	4.2855	4.3964
1939	4.3661	4.3525	4.3435	4.3252	4.3209	4.3214	4.3235	4.3310	4.2779	4.2651	4.3127	4.3937
1940	4.3952	4.3042	4.2805	4.3514	4.4167	4.5497	4.6033	4.4400	4.3091	4.2654	4.2616	4.2423
1941	4.2335	4.2459	4.3283	4.2771	4.2209	4.2206	4.2129	4.2044	4.2314	4.2419	4.1956	4.2165
1942	4.2340	4.2382	4.2284	4.2262	4.2464	4.2561	4.2305	4.2175	4.2253	4.2174	4.2339	4.2401
1943	4.2421	4.2307	4.1963	4.0924	4.0009	3.9892	3.9904	3.9991	3.9997	3.9981	3.9966	3.9912
1944	3.9899	3.9940	4.0152	4.0181	4.0293	4.0277	4.0489	4.0424	4.0294	4.0330	4.0269	4.0407
1945	4.17	4.09	4.02	4.05	4.07	4.07	4.03	4.00	4.01	4.12	4.16	4.15
1946	4.22	4.19	4.19	4.17	4.12	4.09	4.13	4.10	4.14	4.13	4.17	4.21
1947	4.20	4.18	4.16	4.15	4.19	4.19	4.32	4.58	4.61	4.65	4.49	4.48
1948	4.51	4.44	4.44	4.59	5.10	5.63	6.01	6.54	7.16	8.87	8.53	8.50
1949	9.84	9.06	9.06	9.56	10.01	9.56	9.36	9.81	11.88	13.02	15.21	15.86
1950	15.20	14.80	13.90	13.75	13.95	13.74	15.50	17.25	18.05	19.65	19.55	16.50
1951	16.85	15.50	18.20	19.50	25.50	24.10	24.50	28.60	29.50	27.90	27.75	27.00
1952	28.60	26.50	24.50	25.00	23.10	21.25	21.50	20.40	19.80	20.50	21.00	23.15
1953	23.25	22.75	22.85	23.75	23.80	23.60	23.85	21.95	22.75	22.25	19.80	20.10
1954	22.25	22.60	23.25	25.00	26.00	25.50	26.15	26.25	26.50	26.50	26.95	26.70
1955	27.85	28.10	28.40	29.50	31.85	33.25	30.75	31.50	27.00	29.15	32.50	36.00
1956	40.50	42.85	40.50	37.80	35.20	32.60	30.20	32.50	30.80	32.10	34.90	36.55
1957	37.40	36.70	40.50	37.00	40.25	40.75	42.50	43.85	43.00	39.25	37.00	37.20
1958	37.25	38.25	40.50	42.00	42.30	42.10	42.50	46.50	54.25	73.50	71.50	70.50
1959	65.30	68.70	68.40	80.80	88.80	84.90	86.00	83.50	82.50	82.30	83.10	83.30
1960	82.90	82.70	82.90	83.40	82.80	82.50	82.60	82.60	83.00	82.70	82.85	82.65
1961	82.75	82.60	82.90	83.50	82.80	82.60	82.75	83.50	83.25	83.45	83.30	84.20
1962	83.55	83.40	83.80	99.50	112.50	133.00	118.40	126.30	128.80	139.60	148.40	134.10
1963	134.40	135.20	140.30	137.20	138.80	139.00	134.00	134.60	149.60	146.80	140.80	132.50
1964	134.25	130.90	138.25	142.70	140.40	156.55	174.15	169.35	161.22	166.05	179.41	192.89
1965	215.00	223.38	217.88	227.00	248.00	276.20	285.71	272.34	258.18	233.07	225.00	233.90
1966	247.37	238.16	228.88	222.78	234.90	238.29	224.65	227.98	247.35	256.18	266.78	270.60
1967	282.22	295.77	345.24	348.18	348.75	349.25	350.00	349.75	349.75	349.50	349.50	350.00
1968	350.00	350.00	349.75	349.50	350.00	349.50	349.50	350.00	350.00	350.00	350.00	350.00
1969	350.00	349.75	349.50	350.25	351.75	352.00	351.25	351.75	351.75	351.50	351.50	352.25
1970	3.4975	3.5000	3.4850	3.4950	3.5125	4.0100	4.0100	4.0075	4.0175	4.1650	4.2900	4.3350
1971	4.2750	4.1750	4.3350	4.6350	4.8050	5.2550	5.3750	5.8050	6.9050	8.8500	9.7750	9.4000
1972	10.15	10.35	10.00	10.15	11.95	11.75	11.20	13.00	13.70	12.00	11.88	11.25
1973	12.13	11.45	11.43	12.50	12.50	10.88	10.10	10.95	11.10	10.60	10.58	11.20
1974	11.90	12.30	12.40	13.30	14.40	14.90	16.60	17.55	18.70	20.05	20.90	22.00
1975	22.65	23.45	28.35	36.45	47.00	53.00	66.50	76.00	110.00	142.50	132.50	127.50
1976	196.00	270.00	325.00	255.00	245.00	247.50	250.00	263.00	247.00	245.50	273.00	276.00
1977	297.50	332.50	342.50	364.50	372.50	390.00	411.50	437.50	468.50	510.50	550.50	599.50
1978	636.50	679.50	717.50	759.50	765.50	783.50	797.50	832.50	861.50	911.50	956.50	998.00
1979	1,048.50	1,098.50	1,151.50	1,202.50	1,257.50	1,310.50	1,365.50	1,414.50	1,463.50	1,515.50	1,567.50	1,611.50
1980	1,659.50	1,698.50	1,745.50	1,782.50	1,819.50	1,854.50	1,872.50	1,910.50	1,932.50	1,946.50	1,972.50	1,997.50
1981	2,038.50	2,267.50	2,485.50	3,200	3,625	7,050	7,200	7,300	7,590	9,050	11,100	10,400
1982	10,300	10,000	11,850	14,800	21,250	24,250	38,500	49,000	47,500	55,000	63,500	68,000
1983	69,250	80,000	93,250	93,500	98,500	11.50	14.75	19.30	25.90	24.10	24.15	25.65
1984	35.25	44.85	52.85	58.40	65.65	73.65	82.25	108.50	121.80	139.25	180.50	205.00
1985	266.00	356.00	464.00	557.50	673.00	0.855	0.950	0.950	0.900	0.930	0.865	0.875
1986	0.885	0.865	0.925	0.910	0.890	0.880	0.925	1.165	1.213	1.265	1.425	1.668
1987	1.613	1.720	2.035	2.070	2.060	2.145	2.553	3.083	3.625	4.045	4.36	5.10
1988	5.50	6.18	6.48	7.35	9.21	11.32	12.65	14.40	14.96	15.08	15.60	16.41
1989	17.72	28.20	41.00	65.00	167	470	665	665	650	723	920	1,350
1990	1,870	4,150	4,875	4,925	5,005	5,310	5,465	6,305	5,730	5,570	5,170	5,820
1991	7,120	9,720	9,630	9,833	9,923	9,993	9,973	9,973	9,903	9,913	9,909	10,028
1992	0.9905	0.9899	0.9934	0.9895	0.9895	0.9915	0.9919	0.9910	0.9911	0.9911	0.9928	0.9916
1993	0.9991	0.9991	0.9997	0.9978	1.0001	0.9983	0.9996	1.0013	1.0013	0.9991	0.9975	0.9984
1994	0.9984	1.0015	1.0011	0.9986	0.9985	0.9974	0.9984	0.9991	0.9993	0.9990	0.9999	1.0014
1995	1.0006	1.0017	1.0009	1.0011	0.9986	0.9989	0.9994	0.9984	0.9989	1.0003	0.9992	1.0016
1996	0.9992	0.9998	0.9997	0.9995	1.0000	1.0006	1.0012	1.0001	1.0002	0.9995	0.9989	1.0005
1997	0.9985	0.9993	0.9994	0.9995	0.9993	1.0005	0.9998	0.9996	0.9995	1.0022	1.0007	1.0014
1998	0.9988	0.9989	1.0007	1.0001	0.9997	0.9997	1.0002	1.0019	1.0001	1.0035	0.9999	1.0010
1999	1.0003	0.9999	0.9987	0.9994	1.0014	1.0049	0.9997	1.0004	0.9990	1.0000	1.0070	1.0014
2000	0.9996	0.9987	0.9991	0.9987	1.0009	0.9984	0.9990	0.9986	0.9989	0.9999	1.0004	1.0014
2001	0.9992	0.9996	1.0009	1.0001	0.9994	1.0010	1.0290	0.9974	0.9989	1.0029	1.0038	1.0099
2002	1.400	2.150	2.950	2.975	3.600	3.850	3.690	3.610	3.740	3.515	3.620	3.405
2003	3.265	3.168	3.075	2.905	2.832	2.815	2.793	2.928	2.922	2.860	2.880	2.963
2004	2.898	2.934	2.900	2.834	2.920	2.961	2.955	3.015	2.998	2.970	2.954	2.972
2005	2.947	2.916	2.925	2.901	2.892	2.883	2.869	2.889	2.912	2.965	2.967	3.014
2006	3.045	3.069	3.076	3.067	3.053	3.081	3.082	3.078	3.100	3.099	3.076	3.060
2007	3.085	3.103	3.101	3.091	3.081	3.079	3.110	3.153	3.148	3.161	3.135	3.141
2008	3.144	3.158	3.155	3.167	3.152	3.044	3.022	3.034	3.083	3.235	3.332	3.425
2009	3.463	3.511	3.653	3.692	3.727	3.769	3.809	3.839	3.843	3.827	3.811	3.806
2010	3.805	3.852	3.863	3.875	3.902	3.926	3.935	3.937	3.951	3.957	3.968	3.977
2011	3.981	4.022	4.037	4.066	4.084	4.096	4.128	4.169	4.205	4.221	4.260	4.288
2012	4.320	4.348	4.356	4.397	4.449	4.497	4.552	4.610	4.670	4.730	4.797	4.881
2013	4.948	5.009	5.087	5.153	5.236	5.330	5.440	5.581	5.737	5.848	6.012	6.338
2014	7.055	7.862	7.926	8.001	8.039	8.127	8.159	8.317	8.419	8.479	8.514	8.551
2015	8.600	8.684	8.780	8.866	8.948	9.043	9.140	9.242	9.365	9.486	9.628	11.629
2016	13.611	14.797	14.909	14.421	14.132	14.102	14.910	14.842	15.088	15.184	15.343	15.843
2017	15.893	15.577	15.527	15.344	15.695	16.089	17.150	17.425	17.231	17.459	17.493	17.723
2018	19.344	20.148	20.543	20.530	24.223	27.246	28.266	30.879	39.391	38.075	37.485	38.840
2019	38.430	39.428	42.542	44.354	46.089	44.955	43.750	54.650	58.790	61.403	63.013	63.012
2020	62.984	63.581	65.200	67.872	70.048	72.521	75.324	77.489	79.431	83.132	85.485	88.182
2021	91.474	93.998	96.635	98.526	99.613	100.62	101.62	102.57	103.78	104.77	105.83	107.48
2022	109.48	111.95	114.92	118.70	123.20	127.99	135.21	142.29	150.42	159.42	169.15	179.98
2023	189.61	199.09	210.34	223.62	241.49	260.95	279.59	337.29	366.88	367.42	371.66	687.36
2024	863.96	880.60	895.13	911.85	927.37	942.20	961.71	981.82	996.49	1013.20	1030.78	1049.33
2025	1070.72	1087.29	1098.77	1151.43	1170.52	1198.46	1287.60	1343.78	1423.61	1465.28	1455.45	1471.59
2026	1469.94	1431.88	1418.62	1407.29	1419.19	1471.46	1509.04					

The value of one current peso is ten trillion pesos moneda nacional (m$n), the currency in use from 1881 to 1969.

It is also equal, as of July 2026, to 6.4 quadrillion 1914-era pesos with the U.S. dollar as reference – an average annual depreciation relative to the dollar of 28% (i.e. an annual increase of the value of the dollar of 39%).

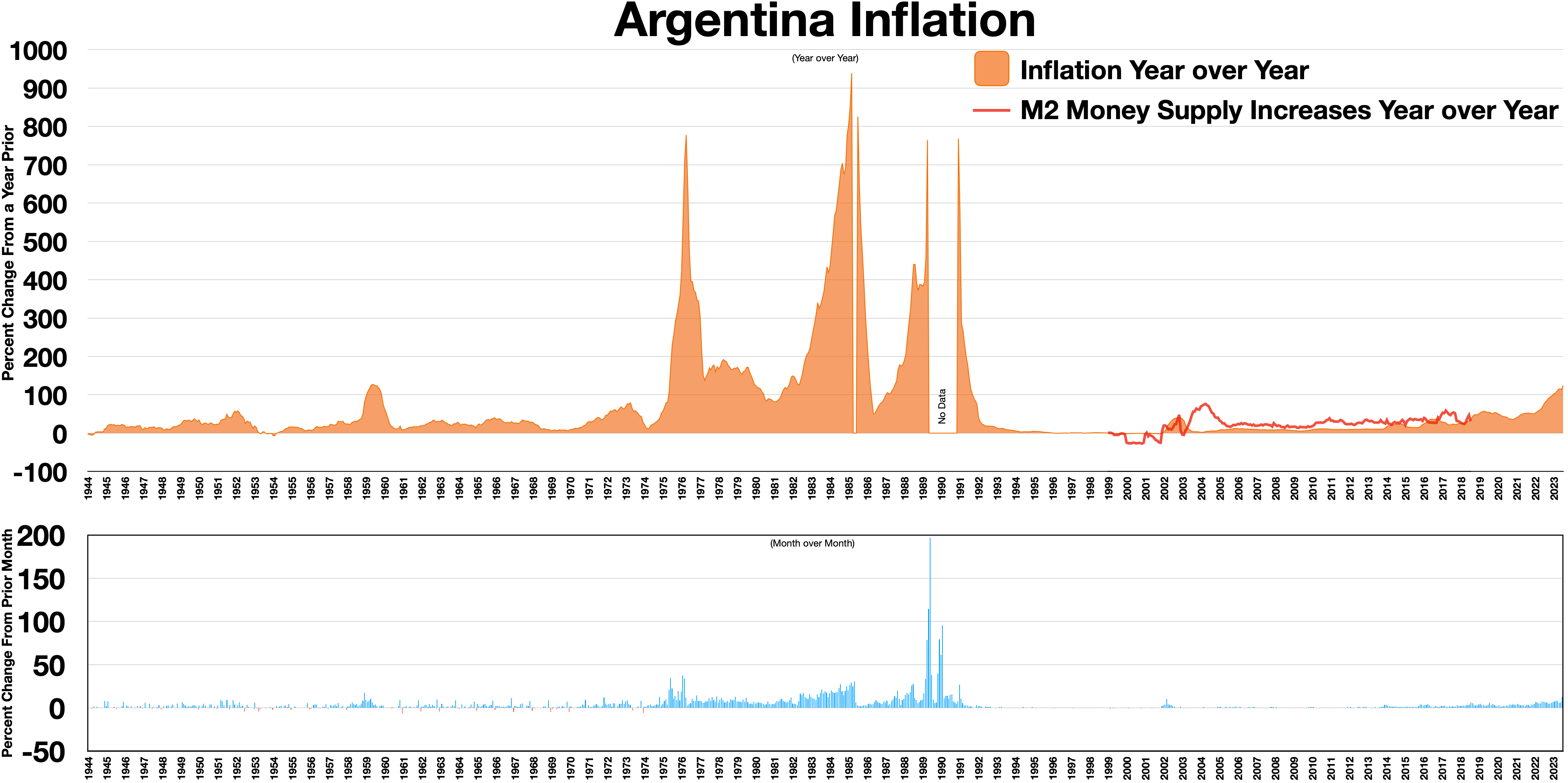
Inflation in Argentina Year over year inflation M2 money supply increases year over year Month over month inflation

== See also ==
- Economic history of Argentina
  - 2018–present Argentine monetary crisis
- Latin American debt crisis
- La Década Perdida ("The Lost Decade"; during the 1980s)

== Sources ==
- Información Económica al Día: Dinero y Bancos, Ministerio de Economía de la República Argentina average monthly exchange rates (in Spanish)
