= Central Bank of Argentina =

Monetary authority of Argentina

Central Bank of the Argentine Republic Banco Central de la República Argentina

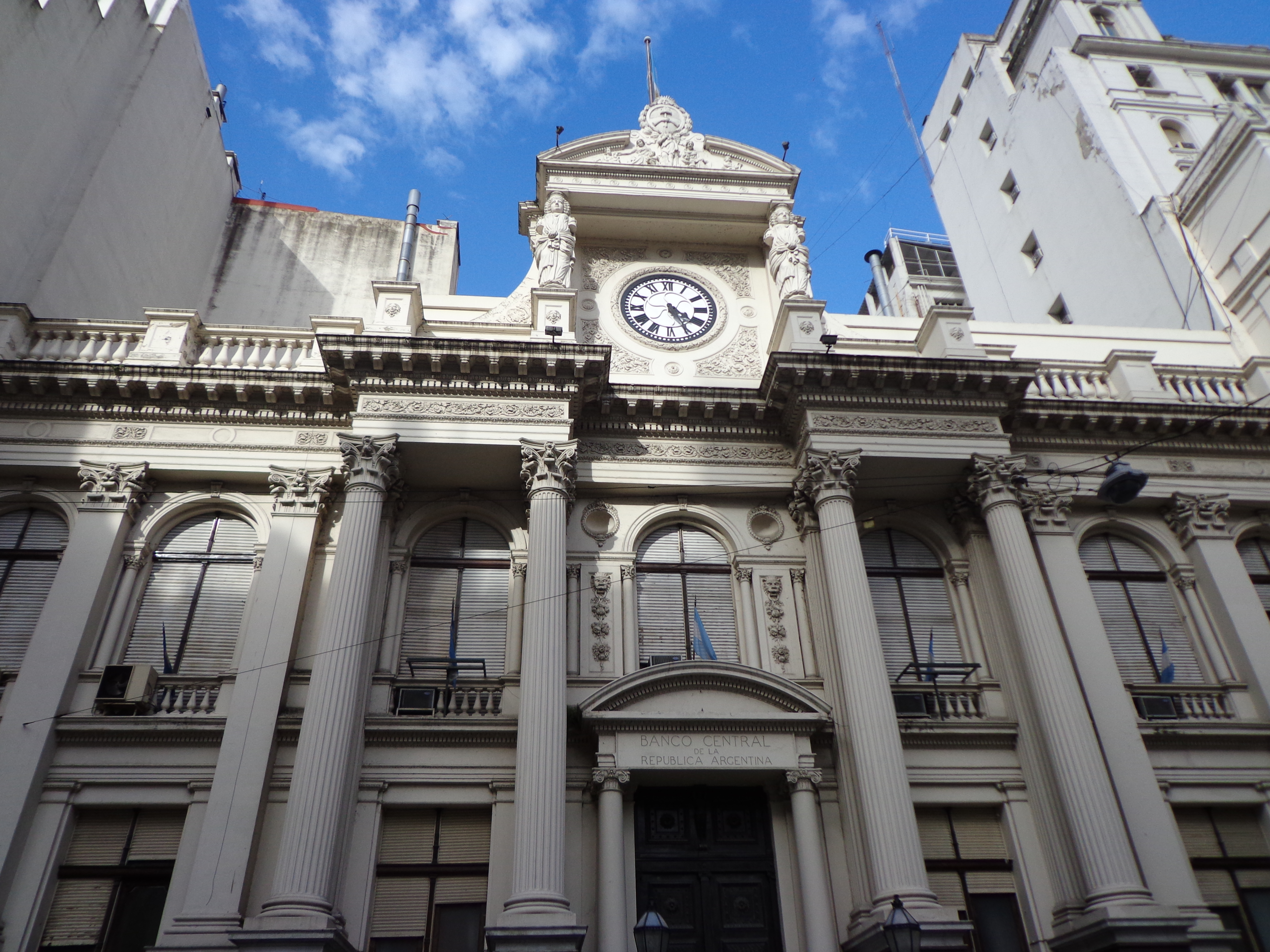
- Central bank of: Argentina
- Headquarters: Buenos Aires
- Coordinates: 34.604801°S 58.372469°W
- Established: 28 May 1935; 91 years ago
- Ownership: 100% state ownership
- President: Santiago Bausili
- Currency: Argentine Peso; ARS (ISO 4217)
- Reserves: $28.385 billion
- Bank rate: 32%
- Website: bcra.gob.ar

The Central Bank of the Argentine Republic (Spanish: Banco Central de la República Argentina, BCRA) is the central bank of Argentina, being an autarchic entity.

Article 3 of the Organic Charter lists the objectives of this Institution: “The bank aims to promote, to the extent of its powers and within the framework of the policies established by the national government, monetary stability, financial stability, employment, and economic development with social equity."

== Establishment ==
Established by six Acts of Congress enacted on May 28, 1935, the bank replaced Argentina's currency board, which had been in operation since 1899. Its first president was Ernesto Bosch, who served in that capacity from 1935 to 1945.

The Central Bank's headquarters on San Martín Street (in the heart of Buenos Aires' financial district, known locally as the city), was originally designed in 1872 by architects Henry Hunt and Hans Schroeder. Completed in 1876, the Italian Renaissance-inspired building initially housed the Mortgage Bank of the Province of Buenos Aires. The Central Bank's offices were transferred to an adjacent address upon its establishment, and were expanded to their present size by the purchase of the Mortgage Bank building in 1940, as well as by the construction of a twin building behind it.

Drawing from a 1933 study on Argentine finance by Bank of England director Sir Otto Niemeyer, the institution's charter was drafted by Argentine economist Raúl Prebisch; Prebisch would serve as general manager until 1943. The Central Bank was a private entity during its first decade, and British interests held a majority stake; the president of the Central Bank was appointed by the president of Argentina, but 11 of its 12 directors were private bank CEOs. Pursuant to the Roca–Runciman Treaty of 1933, Central Bank reserves accrued from Argentine trade surpluses with the United Kingdom were deposited in escrow at the Bank of England, and this clause, which had led to nearly US$1 billion in inaccessible reserves (more than half the total) by 1945, prompted the BCRA's nationalization by order of Juan Perón on March 24, 1946.

== Modern history ==
Normally subordinate to the Economy Ministry in matters of policy, the Central Bank took a more prominent role during the Latin American debt crisis when, in April 1980, it enacted Circular 1050. This measure, enacted to shield the financial sector from the cost of receiving payments in suddenly devalued pesos, bankrupted thousands of homeowners and businesses by indexing mortgages to the value of the US dollar locally, which had risen around fifteenfold by July 1982 when Central Bank President Domingo Cavallo rescinded the policy.

During the years of Cavallo's Convertibility Law, which established a 1:1 fixed exchange rate between the Argentine peso and the United States dollar on April 1, 1991, the BCRA was mainly in charge of keeping foreign currency reserves in synch with the monetary base. The policy deprived the Central Bank of exchange-rate flexibility, however, and ended at the depth of a record economic crisis a decade later.

The repeal of the Convertibility Law in January 2002 was accompanied by a 70% devaluation and depreciation of the peso to nearly 4 pesos, and the Central Bank's role afterward was the accumulation of reserves in order to gain a measure of control of the exchange rate. The BCRA buys and sells dollars from the market as needed to absorb large foreign trade surpluses and keep the official exchange rate at internationally competitive levels for Argentine exports and to encourage import substitution.

As part of a wider debt restructuring effort that brought Argentina out of its default three years earlier, in December 2005 President Néstor Kirchner announced the payment of Argentina's IMF debts in a single, anticipated disbursement. The payment was effected on January 3, 2006, employing about US$9.8 billion from BCRA reserves. This decreased the amount of reserves by one third, but did not cause adverse monetary effects, save from an increased reliance on the local bond market, which requires somewhat higher interest rates.

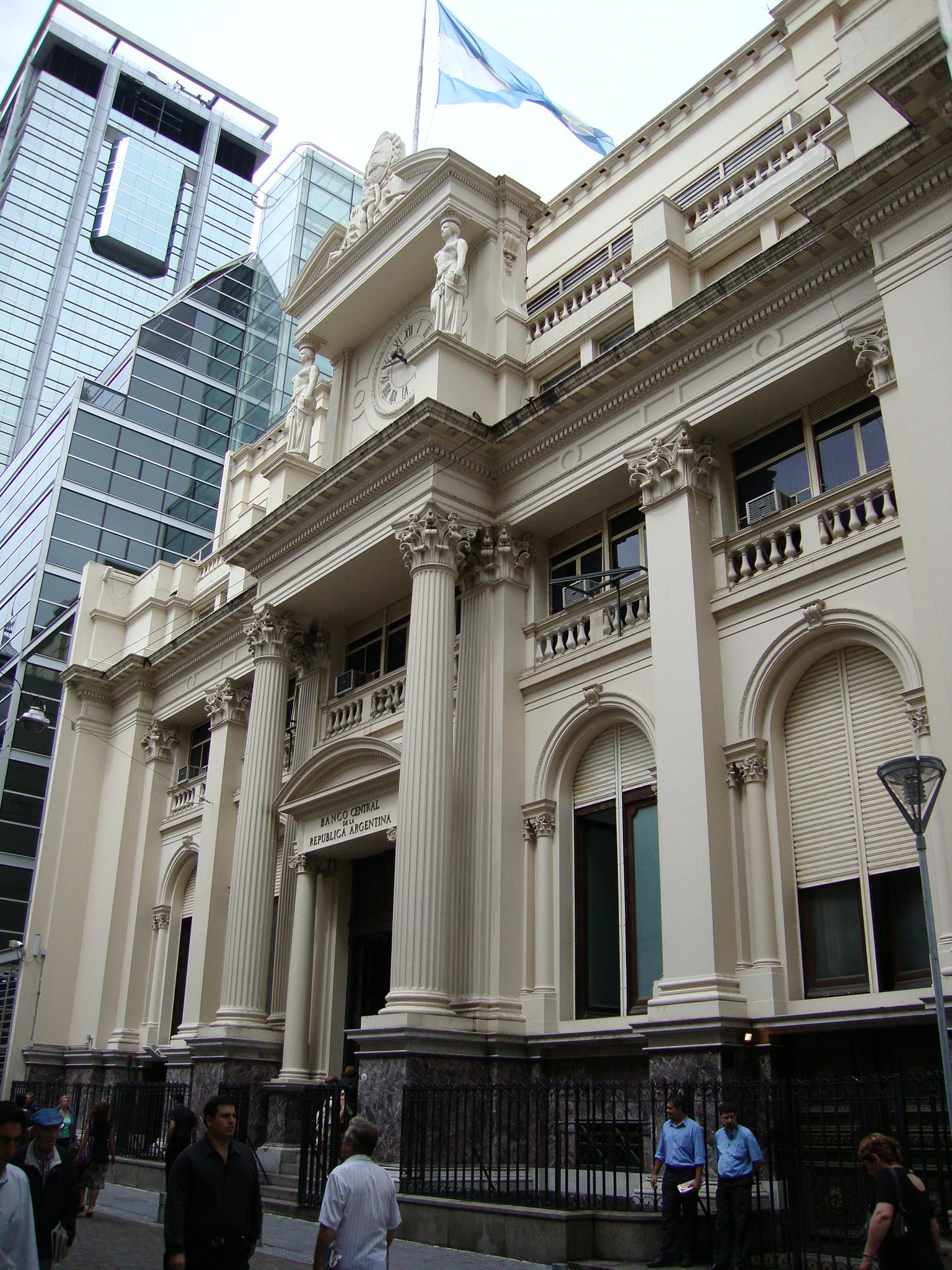
The Central Bank's Reconquista Street entrance, built in 1940 in imitation of its older, opposite entrance

The BCRA continued to intervene in the exchange market, usually buying dollars, though occasionally selling small amounts (for example, reacting to rumors of a possible increase of the Federal Reserve's reference rate, which caused a minor spike in the dollar's value). Its reserves reached US$28 billion in September 2006, recovering the levels prior to the IMF payment, and rose to US$32 billion at the close of the year. The exchange rate was maintained relatively undervalued, prompted by the BCRA's market intervention as a buyer.

While fiscal policy remained fairly tight, monetary policy was highly expansionary with growth in Argentina's money supply of over 23% annually from 2003 to 2007. Citing its disapproval of this policy, the influential Global Finance magazine gave Martín Redrado, President of the Central Bank, a D grade in its October 2006 survey of global central bankers. The magazine held that Redrado "missed the opportunity to act to curb inflation when the economy was expanding at its fastest, with inflation expected to reach 12% in 2006, up from 7.7% in 2005 and 4.4% in 2004." Price controls helped keep inflation that year to 9.8%, though the public's perception of it was higher due to the sample composition used to measure the index; differences between official and private inflation estimates widened dramatically from 2007 onward. The BCRA, however, obtained exceptionally high returns on investment funded by its reserves, for a total of US$1.4 billion (a yearly rate of 5.7%) in 2006, and continued to do so in subsequent years.

Fallout from the 2008 financial crisis later forced President Cristina Fernández de Kirchner's administration to seek domestic financing for growing public spending, as well as for foreign debt service obligations; her administration, like many of her predecessors, has used the nominally independent Central Bank to prop up government finances and to support political goals. The president ordered a US$6.7 billion account opened at the Central Bank for the latter purpose in December 2009, implying the use of the Central Bank's foreign exchange reserves, and drawing direct opposition from Redrado. He was dismissed by presidential decree on January 7, 2010, prior to which Economy Minister Amado Boudou had announced that Mario Blejer (who had expressed support for the measure) would be appointed in his stead.

Following an impasse, Redrado was ultimately replaced by Mercedes Marcó del Pont, President of the National Bank of Argentina, on February 3.

Redrado's removal triggered a vocal rebuke from opposition figures in Congress, who, citing the need to preserve the Central Bank's nominal autarky, expressed doubts as to the decree's legality.

A court injunction blocked Kirchner's planned use of reserves for the retirement of high-interest bonds, a move that could have provided numerous vulture funds (holdouts from the 2005 debt restructuring who had resorted to the courts in a bid for higher returns on their defaulted bonds) a legal argument against the central bank's autarky, and thus make judgement liens against the central bank's overseas accounts possible.

The BCRA acquired a greater role as a commercial lender subsequently. The Bicentennial Fund, established in January 2010 as the vehicle for the controversial refinancing plan that led to Redrado's removal, financed fixed investment projects totaling US$2.4 billion in its first two years; a change proposed by President Fernández de Kirchner to the bank's governing statutes would allow it to function as a commercial lender outright.

The Argentine Senate approved a reform of the Central Bank charter on 22 March 2012. Under the new regime the government will be free to pay public debt using the Central Bank's reserves. The bank would also be enabled to expand its lending capacity to the Treasury, effectively giving a boost to the government's finances. Marcó del Pont's successor, National Bank President Juan Carlos Fábrega, shifted monetary policy to an anti-inflationary stance during 2014, however, raising the benchmark 3-month note interest rate to over 28%. The rate hike had the effect of reducing Central Bank operating profits, which reached a record US$12 billion in 2014, by up to 90%; but it also absorbed around US$5 billion in liquidity from the economy, and contributed to a reduction in inflation from an estimated 37% in 2014 to around 25%. This policy was largely continued by Fábrega's successor, former National Securities Commission President Alejandro Vanoli.

The Central Bank's foreign exchange reserves, which from early 2008 to early 2012 hovered between US$47 billion and US$50 billion, declined by 2014 to less than US$30 billion (an eight-year low) before stabilizing and recovering slightly. This reduction had two major facets: annual current account deficits of US$5 billion brought about by smaller merchandise trade surpluses, growing spending by Argentine tourists abroad, and interest payments on bonds held overseas (foreign debt); and a capital account deficit that reached US$7 billion in 2013 amid a foreign exchange control policy that proved counterproductive and was substantially eased in January 2014.

The official exchange rate, which had oscillated around 3 pesos per dollar since early 2003, was adversely impacted by the international 2008 financial crisis, and likewise weakened to 8 pesos per dollar by the first half of 2014. A parallel, "blue" exchange market - a fixture of Argentine finance in the 1970s and '80s - reemerged when foreign exchange controls were tightened in 2012; it similarly stabilized at around 13 pesos when controls were eased in 2014.

One of the first changes to economic policy from the Macri administration, just seven days after Macri had taken office, was to remove the currency controls that had been in place for four consecutive years. The move signified a 30% devaluation of the peso, and was met with both criticism and praise.

== See also ==
- List of presidents of the Central Bank of Argentina
- Argentine peso
- Banco Alas
- Economy of Argentina
- List of central banks
- List of financial supervisory authorities by country
