= Argentine Ambassador to the European Union =

Coordinates: 50.825785°N 4.364952°E

Ambassador of Argentina to the European Union
- Inaugural holder: Carlos Alberto Juni
- Formation: November 8, 1962

The Argentine Ambassador in Brussels is the official representative of the Argentine Government to the Institutions of the European Union.

== List of representatives ==
Diplomatic agrément/Diplomatic accreditation	Ambassador	Observations	List of heads of state of Argentina	President of the European Commission	Term end
November 8, 1962	Carlos Alberto Juni	In 1960 he was Minister of Commerce and Industry of the Argentine Republic Carlos Alberto Juni, Argentine, married, lawyer,	José María Guido	Piero Malvestiti	
July 29, 1965	Hugo Boatti Ossario	(born 1925 February 20, 2005): From 1976 to 1980 he was Argentine Ambassador to Sweden; From 1984 to 1989 he was Argentine Ambassador to Germany.	Arturo Umberto Illia	Rinaldo Del Bo	
February 10, 1967	Leopoldo Hugo Tettamanti	(*October 12, 1926 Buenos Aires): Son of Luis Tettamanti and Amalla Martínez.; Married to Aurora Alzueta.; Sons: Julián Luis, Pablo Anselmo, Diego Javier y Andrea Rexana.; From 1976 to 1980 he was Argentine Ambassador to Russia	Juan Carlos Onganía	Rinaldo Del Bo	
March 5, 1974	Ildefonso Recalde	From 1959 to 1962 he was CEO of the Compañía Argentina de Televisión (CADETE) Canal 9 (Buenos Aires)	Isabel Perón	François-Xavier Ortoli	
July 14, 1975	Antonio Cafiero	Antonio Francisco Cafiero	Isabel Perón	François-Xavier Ortoli	
July 19, 1976	Carlos Moyano Llerena		Jorge Rafael Videla	François-Xavier Ortoli	
January 17, 1978	Elvio Baldinelli	From 1968 to 1970 he was Secretary of State for Foreign Trade.; From 1981 to 1982 he was Mining and Industry Secretary.; From 1977 to 1982 he was Ambassador to the European Economic Community.; In 1980 he was Vice-president of the Argentine Central Bank.	Jorge Rafael Videla	Roy Jenkins	
October 4, 1984	Luis Ramiro Alfonsin	(*June 21, 1930), is the third of the children of Raúl Alfonsín.	Raúl Alfonsín	Gaston Thorn	
November 7, 1989	Diego Ramiro Guelar		Carlos Menem	Jacques Delors	
September 10, 1996	Juan José Uranga (1936-2004)	Son of Juan José Uranga: In 2000 he was Argentine ambassador to Brazil	Carlos Menem	Jacques Santer	
August 1, 2000	Roberto Lavagna		Fernando de la Rúa	Romano Prodi	
July 17, 2002	Jorge Remes Lenicov		Eduardo Duhalde	Romano Prodi	
March 18, 2014	Hernán Lorenzino	Hernán Gaspar Lorenzino	Cristina Fernández de Kirchner	José Manuel Barroso	
July 1, 2016	Mario Raúl Verón Guerra		Mauricio Macri	Jean-Claude Juncker	
April 10, 2018	Marcelo Cima		Mauricio Macri	Jean-Claude Juncker	
May 15, 2020	Pablo Grinspun		Alberto Fernández	Ursula Von der Leyen	June 15, 2023
June 19, 2023	Atilio Berardi		Alberto Fernández	Ursula Von der Leyen	December 10, 2023

- Argentina–European Union relations
