= Deolindo Bittel =

Argentine politician

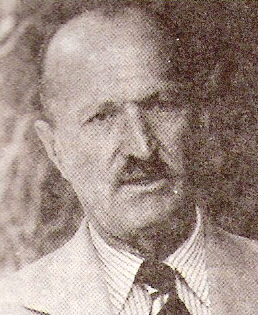

National Senator
- In office December 10, 1989 – September 22, 1997
- Constituency: Chaco
- In office December 10, 1983 – December 10, 1987
- Constituency: Chaco

Mayor of Resistencia
- In office December 10, 1987 – December 10, 1989

Governor of Chaco
- In office May 25, 1973 – March 24, 1976
- Vice Governor: Alberto Torresagasti
- Preceded by: Roberto Mazza
- Succeeded by: José Zucconi
- In office October 12, 1963 – June 28, 1966
- Vice Governor: Nilson Franchisena
- Preceded by: Marcelino Castelán
- Succeeded by: Rafael Torrado

Personal details
- Born: May 26, 1922 Villa Ángela, Chaco Province
- Died: September 22, 1997 (aged 75) Resistencia
- Party: Justicialist Party
- Spouses: Mercedes Soto; Nora Salas
- Profession: Notary public

Deolindo Bittel (May 26, 1922 – September 22, 1997) was a prominent Argentine politician.

== Life and times ==
=== Early career and entry into politics ===
Deolindo Felipe Bittel was born in Villa Ángela, a Chaco Province town known for its tannin industry, in 1922 to a farming family of French Belgian descent. He was 9 when he witnessed his father fall to his death into a deep ditch, and was later sent to nearby Esperanza, Santa Fe Province to complete his secondary schooling. Bittel enrolled at the National University of the Littoral, where he received a degree as a notary public in 1945. He married Mercedes Elsie Soto and had 2 sons; he later married Nora Salas.

The advent of Peronism in Argentina led Bittel to run on Juan Perón's Labor Party ticket for mayor of Villa Ángela in 1946. The young candidate was elected, though the results were annulled by the then-conservative Chaco authorities. Following Chaco's 1951 designation as a province, voters in 1953 elected the Peronist ticket of Governor Felipe Gallardo and his running mate, "Chacho" Bittel. The September 1955 coup d'état against Perón brought an end to the Gallardo-Bittel tenure, as well as to the province's designation as "Provincia Presidente Perón."

President Arturo Frondizi's lifting of the 1956 electoral ban on Peronism led to nationwide Peronist candidacies in the 1962 elections, and of 14 provinces whose governorships were in play, they carried 10 - including Bittel's victory in Chaco. These elections, however, also led to Frondizi's overthrow by the anti-peronist military, leaving governor-elect Bittel unable to take office. New elections were called for 1963, for which Bittel agreed to an alliance with his former adversaries, the Conservative Party; elected with conservative running mate Nilson Franchisena by over 12% over the centrist UCR-P, he was duly sworn in as governor on October 12.

=== Governor of Chaco Province ===
Governor Bittel steered a moderate course, and avoided partisan wrangling. He granted municipal demands for restored prior autonomy and introduced the lottery to Chaco, which became an important source of funds for education in the underdeveloped province. Bittel also commissioned a comprehensive hydrological study of his flood-prone province, debate over which was drowned by a devastating 1965 flood near the capital, Resistencia. He was reelected in 1965 by 11%, though Peronists' new success at that year's midterm elections again led to the overthrow of the president (Arturo Illia) and to the replacement of civilian governors by military comptrollers.

The dictatorship in 1966 eventually responded to a growing crisis atmosphere by calling elections in 1973, which the exiled Perón's Justicialist Party won handily - electing a new president, majorities in both houses of Congress and among governors (including Bittel). He and running mate Alberto Torresagasti won by 29%, and they took office on May 25. Bittel's second turn at the governorship was marked by his development efforts, and his three-year plan was approved by the legislature in 1974. The plan focused on public works investments for Chaco, which had not shared adequately in the national prosperity that had prevailed over the previous decade. His efforts were hampered in 1975 both by a sudden inflationary crisis in Argentina (335%), as well as by a sharp drop in global cotton prices - thereby adversely affecting a leading source of revenue for the agrarian province. He was increasingly distanced from the right-wing Peronist leadership in power at the national level and ultimately, a March 24, 1976, military coup again cut his tenure short.

The Justicialist Party (JP) elected Bittel its vice president during the dictatorship, though they and other political parties remained banned from public activity; as the party's titular leader, deposed President Isabel Perón, remained in custody, this made Bittel the party's highest-ranking active member. In that capacity, Bittel secretly authored a detailed report on human rights atrocities – many of whose victims were his fellow Peronists. The report was delivered to the fact-finding commission assembled by the Inter-American Commission on Human Rights, during their September 1979 visit to Argentina. The file helped put the lie to the regime's vigorous denials of its abuses, and helped align Peronists (hitherto divided between left and right-wing factions) against the dictatorship. Elections increasingly likely, he led the JP into the "Multiparty" formed by UCR leader Ricardo Balbín in early 1981 to lobby the dictatorship for a return to democracy.

=== Candidate for vice president ===
The collapse of the regime's economic policies and the defeat at the Falklands War helped lead to elections in 1983. The Justicialist Party struggled to nominate its candidates. Nominating conventions dragged on for two months after the rival UCR nominated Raúl Alfonsín. The party's cornerstone, the CGT labor union, successfully supported Ítalo Lúder (who had served as acting president during Mrs. Perón's September 1975 sick leave) for president, and Bittel became his running mate. The choice was made partly to balance Lúder's record, as he had authorized repression against the violent left in 1975, whereas Bittel had been a populist who was remembered for his defense of the disappeared during the dictatorship.

Ultimately, the Peronists' late start (the nomination was secured less than two months before election day), Alfonsín's skillful campaign, voters' bitter memories of Isabel Perón's chaotic tenure, and other problems put their ticket at a disadvantage. Bittel himself unwittingly gave the ticket bad publicity when, during a Buenos Aires rally, he botched one of Perón's many aphorisms, declaring that "Our choice is between liberation and dependence, and we choose dependence!" Hardly noticed at the time, the misstep did not significantly contribute to the outcome (a loss for the Lúder-Bittel ticket by 12%).

=== Senior politician ===
The Legislature of Chaco Province named Bittel to the Senate following his electoral loss, and he took office on December 10. At his party's request, he relinquished the seat in 1987 to become Mayor of the provincial capital, Resistencia. Bittel suffered a serious automobile accident in 1988, which left him without the use of one arm, and in chronic pain. He was returned to the Senate in 1989, where he eventually became Chairman of the Committee on Senate Accords, as well as Vice Chairman of the Committee on Freedom of Expression. His experience in Chaco Province also led to a post as Vice President of the Indigenous Parliament of the Americas.

Two months before the end of his Senate term in 1997, Bittel was admitted to a hospital for abdominal surgery. He suffered complications, however, and died at age 75. The Lower House of the Chaco Legislature was renamed in his honor, and his widow, Nora Bittel, became Director of the charitable foundation in his name.
