= Mayor Luis Jorge Fontana Department =

- Department
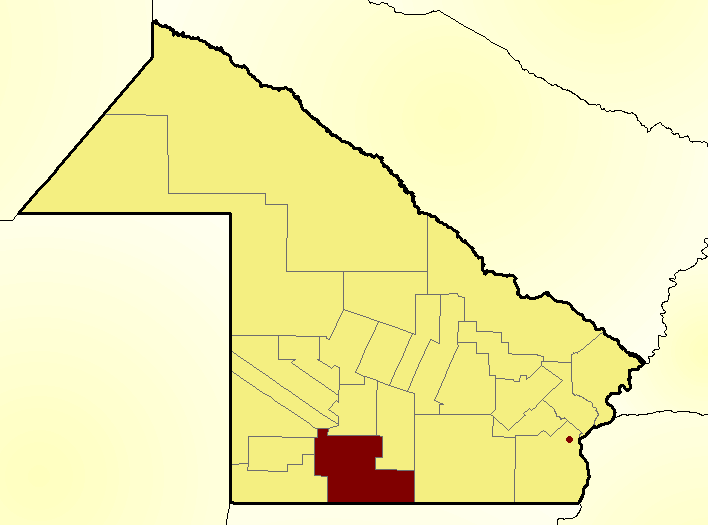
- Location of Mayor Luis Jorge Fontana Department within Chaco Province
- Coordinates: 27°35′S 60°43′W
- Country: Argentina
- Province: Chaco Province
- Established: 1910 (Villa Ángela)
- Head town: Villa Ángela

Population
  - Total: 53,550
- Time zone: UTC-3 (ART)
- Postal code: H3540
- Area code: 03735

Mayor Luis Jorge Fontana is a southern department of Chaco Province in Argentina.

The provincial subdivision has a population of about 53,500 inhabitants in an area of 3,708 km^{2}, and its capital city is Villa Ángela, which is located around 182 km from the provincial capital. The department takes its name from Luis Jorge Fontana, the first governor of Chubut and an explorer of the region.

== Settlements ==
- Coronel Du Graty
- Enrique Urién
- Villa Ángela
