= Rodolfo Frigeri =

Argentine economist and politician

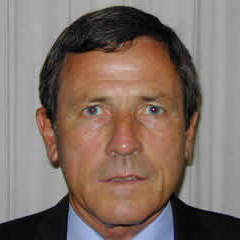

Minister of the Treasury, Finance and Public Revenue
- In office December 23, 2001 – December 30, 2001
- President: Adolfo Rodríguez Saá
- Preceded by: Jorge Capitanich
- Succeeded by: Jorge Remes Lenicov

Personal details
- Born: Rodolfo Aníbal Frigeri; 1 April 1941 Banfield, Buenos Aires, Argentina
- Died: 2 October 2015 (aged 74)
- Party: Justicialist Party
- Education: University of Buenos Aires
- Occupation: Economist; Politician

Rodolfo Aníbal Frigeri (1 April 1941 – 2 October 2015) was an Argentine economist and politician. He served as the Minister of Economy and Public Finances from December 23, 2001, to December 30, 2001, during the brief administration of President Adolfo Rodríguez Saá under the title "Minister of the Treasury, Finance and Public Revenue."

Frigeria was born in Banfield, Buenos Aires, the son of José Manuel María Frigeri and Livia Oddera. Frigeri received a bachelor's degree in public economics from the University of Buenos Aires in 1970. He became Minister of Finance of Mendoza Province in 1975 during Antonio Cafiero's administration of the province.

Frigeri later became the Minister of the Economy of Buenos Aires Province from 1987 to July 1989, also under Cafiero, who had become Governor of Buenos Aires Province. In July 1989, Frigeri joined the staff of the Department of the Treasury at the beginning of President Carlos Menem's administration.

Frigeri became the President of the Bank of the Province of Buenos Aires (Bapro) in 1991. He later became the chairman of Grupo Bapro and served as a deputy in the Argentine Chamber of Deputies from 1997 to 2005.

Rodolfo Frigeri died on October 3, 2015, at the age of 73.
