= Alejandro Armendáriz =

Argentine physician and politician

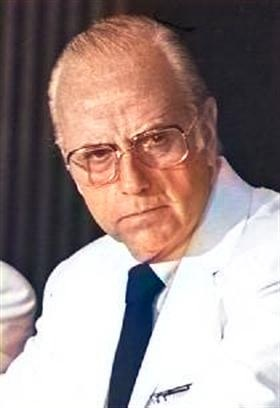

National Deputy
- In office 10 December 1991 – 10 December 1995
- Constituency: Buenos Aires Province

Governor of Buenos Aires
- In office 11 December 1983 – 11 December 1987
- Vice Governor: Elva Roulet
- Preceded by: Jorge Aguado
- Succeeded by: Antonio Cafiero

Provincial Deputy of Buenos Aires
- In office 12 October 1965 – 28 June 1966
- Constituency: Seventh Electoral Section

Personal details
- Born: 5 June 1923 Saladillo, Buenos Aires Province Argentina
- Died: 7 August 2005 (aged 82)
- Party: Radical Civic Union
- Profession: Physician

Alejandro Armendáriz (5 June 1923 – 7 August 2005) was an Argentine physician and politician.

== Life and times ==
=== Early career ===
Armendáriz was born in Saladillo, a pampas town in the Province of Buenos Aires, in 1923. His family relocated to the city of Buenos Aires in 1940, where he graduated from the Marist College of San José (a college preparatory school), the following year. Enrolling at the prestigious University of Buenos Aires, he received a medical degree in 1949 and returned to Saladillo. He married Olga Guillermina Gaddi, with whom he had two children.

Practicing medicine, he became affiliated to the centrist Radical Civic Union (UCR) and was elected vice-president of their local chapter in 1951 and city councilman in 1954. The increasingly autocratic president Juan Perón, the UCR's chief rival, had Peronist Governor Carlos Aloe annul the Saladillo elections within days, however. Armendáriz was returned to the city council in 1963 and was elected in 1965 to the Argentine Chamber of Deputies (the Lower House of Congress). Known for his quiet, tenacious nature and stoic approach to adversity, Armendáriz became affectionately known as "the titan" to those around him.

The 1966 deposal of President Arturo Illia (of the UCR) by General Juan Carlos Onganía dissolved the Argentine Congress and forced Armendáriz to return to his medical practice. The imminence of new elections in 1972 led him to join fellow former UCR Congressman Raúl Alfonsín in founding the "Movement for Renewal and Change," a center-left faction opposed to the party's longtime leader, Ricardo Balbín, who defeated Alfonsín in their party's primary ahead of the March 1973 elections. Armendáriz's friendship with Alfonsín continued during the turbulent 1970s, when the latter practiced law in defense of victims of the wave of human rights abuses in Argentina, later in the decade. Following Alfonsín's daring and timely opposition of the ill-considered Falklands War in 1982, he became the frontrunner within the UCR on the eve of elections agreed to by the discredited dictatorship, in 1983. Securing the nomination in July, Alfonsín advanced Armendáriz as the UCR candidate for governor of the Province of Buenos Aires, home to 38% of Argentines.

=== Governor of Argentina's largest province ===
Two out of three residents in the province live in the Greater Buenos Aires area, a quiltwork of largely working-class suburbs long aligned with Perón's populist Justicialist Party. Armendáriz selected as his running mate Elva Roulet, an architect from the Greater Buenos Aires suburb of San Martín whose personable demeanor complemented Armendáriz's reserved nature well.

Polls gave neither man an edge, and on election day, October 30, as Argentines gathered in a then-record turnout, the Justicialist candidate, Herminio Iglesias, threw a (premature) "victory rally" in which a coffin draped in the UCR colors was burned before the television cameras. The macabre scene ignited the electorate's bitter memories of Isabel Perón's chaotic 1974-76 presidency and helped result in a solid victory for both Alfonsín and Armendáriz. Excluding blank and invalid votes, of 5.4 million cast, Armendáriz received 2.8 million (52%) - soundly defeating the odds-on favorite, Iglesias, by 12%.

Inheriting a province reeling from the effects of a national economic crisis and years of police and other legal abuses, Governor Armendáriz undertook the reform of the provincial judicial system while acting decisively to confront growing crime rates. He enacted laws expanding the use of oral testimony in criminal courts, establishing the Crime Prevention Council and, despite tight budgets, adding 6,000 police officers and expanding the number of police precincts from 186 to 310.

His social policy was equally vigorous. He added 24,000 teachers to the strained public school system, while having 560 schools built and establishing building administration posts to remodel many others. Increasing spending on poverty relief programs, his efforts began or completed 37,000 public housing units, while extending public running water to around a million people and public sewers to 600,000 households (over 2 million people). A physician by vocation, he had clinics and hospitals built totaling 54,000 m^{2} (580,000 ft^{2}), while incorporating six bankrupt facilities into the provincial aegis (including the Saladillo Hospital). Severe flooding in the north of the province (the center of the nation's grain belt) in 1984 led the Governor to enact the Master Hydrostructural Plan, which built numerous needed levees and canals, while closing illegally built ones.

These and other works could not overcome voters' growing disapproval of President Alfonsín's policy of wage freezes and credit controls, which the opposition Justicialist Party blamed for sliding living standards. Anti-incumbent sentiment and fallout from the 1986 indictment of Armendáriz's son-in-law, José Luis Nicora, for embezzlement while Mayor of Magdalena cost his party the governorship in the September 1987 election. Justicialist nominee Antonio Cafiero, an economist and legislator close to the late Juan Perón, received 47% of the vote, defeating UCR nominee Juan Manuel Casella by 7 points.

=== Later life ===
Alfonsín appointed Armendáriz head of the Crisis Management Commission overseeing PAMI, the national health insurance plan covering most seniors and the indigent. Entrusted with the post in March 1988, Armendáriz was able to restore stability to the perennially mismanaged PAMI by September, dissolving the crisis commission in favor of a panel presided by Argentina's two leading senior citizens' advocacy groups. Reducing hitherto rampant subcontractor fraud, PAMI was restored to solvency while adding spousal benefits and vacation subsidies for beneficiaries. Remaining active in the UCR after their sharp loss in the 1989 presidential race, he was returned to the Argentine Chamber of Deputies in 1991, where he became the ranking member of the Health Committee.

A September 1997 automobile accident nearly cost Armendáriz his life, and he retired from Congress. Remaining politically active in the provincial capital of La Plata, he suffered another serious accident, at his office, in April 2004. Unable to recover, Alejandro Armendáriz died at his Saladillo home in 2005. He was 82.

A distinguished Argentine physician, politician and lawmaker, he was survived by his widow, children and 7 grandchildren. His legacy of transparency and efficiency earned him the respect of figures from both parties.

== References and external links ==
Political offices
Preceded by Jorge Aguado	Governor of Buenos Aires Province; 1983 – 1987	Succeeded by Antonio Cafiero
