= 1983 Argentine general election =

- Presidential election
- 30 October 1983

600 members of the Electoral College 301 votes needed to win
- Registered: 17,929,951
- Turnout: 85.61%
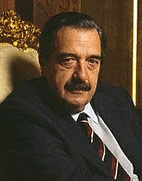

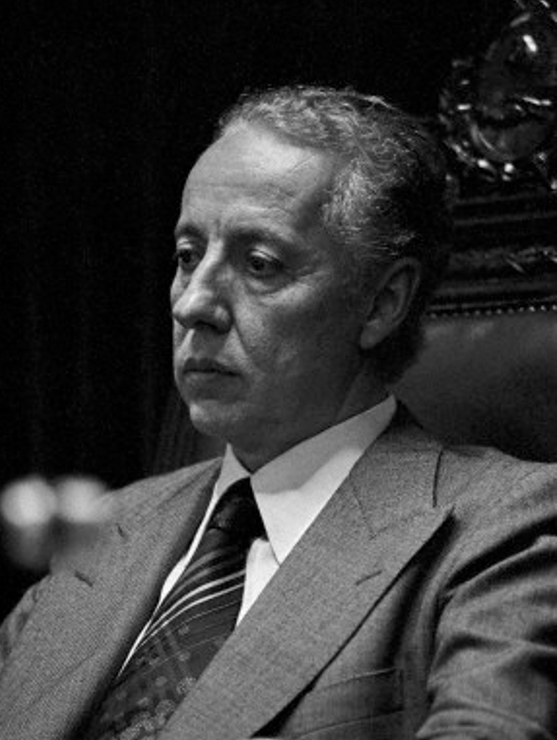
Candidate	Raúl Alfonsín	Ítalo Argentino Luder
Party	Radical Civic Union	Justicialist Party
Running mate	Víctor Martínez	Deolindo Bittel
Electoral vote	317	259
Popular vote	7,724,559	5,944,402
Percentage	51.75%	40.16%
- Percentage of votes (left) and electoral votes (right) by province
President before election
Reynaldo Bignone
Military
Elected President
Raúl Alfonsín
UCR
- Chamber of Deputies election
- 30 October 1983
- All 254 seats in the Chamber of Deputies; 128 seats needed for a majority
- Turnout: 85.61%
Party	Vote %	Seats
Radical Civic Union	47.97	129
Justicialist Party	38.47	111
Intransigent Party	2.78	3
Union of the Democratic Centre	1.70	2
Christian Democratic Party	0.94	1
Autonomist Party of Corrientes	0.45	1
Blockist Party of San Juan	0.42	2
Liberal Party of Corrientes	0.31	1
Neuquén People's Movement	0.24	2
Jujuy People's Movement	0.18	1
Pampa Federalist Movement	0.11	1
This lists parties that won seats. See the complete results below.
Results by province

General elections were held in Argentina on 30 October 1983, marking the return of constitutional rule following the self-styled National Reorganization Process dictatorship installed in 1976. Voters fully chose the president, governors, mayors, and their respective national, province and town legislators, with a turnout of 85.6%.

== Background ==
The government of Isabel Perón faced several simultaneous crises in 1976. Guerrillas such as Montoneros and the People's Revolutionary Army (ERP) were out of control and caused hundreds of deaths each month. In turn, the army counter-attacked with undercover agents, the Argentine Anticommunist Alliance. The Rodrigazo caused an annual inflation rate above 600 percent and growing, which, coupled with union unrest, left the national industry in a virtual halt. Congresswoman Cristina Guzmán also accused Perón of stealing funds from a charity, but the Congress refused to proceed with an impeachment. All this led to the 1976 Argentine coup d'état, as most of society perceived the military as the only ones capable of fixing the crises.

General Roberto Viola was deposed in 1981 by Leopoldo Galtieri, during a "palace coup", which strengthened the political clout of the Agentine Navy. Opposed by the other military factions and fearing to be deposed in a new coup, Galtieri planned an invasion of the Falkland Islands. The 1982 invasion of the Falkland Islands gave a huge popularity boost to the Junta, but it also caused a bank panic and undermined the attempts of minister Roberto Alemann to decrease inflation and stabilize the economy. This boost turned into a massive decrease after the Argentine surrender in the Falklands War, even more because the local media distorted the events and the surrender came as a complete surprise to the population.

Six years of intermittent wage freezes, policies adverse to industry and restrictive measures like the Circular 1050 had left GDP per capita at its lowest level since 1968, and real wages lower by around 40%. Given these conditions, the return of some freedoms quickly led to a wave of strikes, including two general strikes led by Saúl Ubaldini of the CGT labor federation (then the largest in South America). Fanning antagonism on the part of hard-liners in the regime, this led Admiral Jorge Anaya (later court-martialed for gross malfeasance in the 1982 Falklands War) to announce his candidacy for president in August, becoming the first to do so; he proved to be highly unpopular and Bignone immediately thwarted the move.

Amid growing calls for quicker elections, police brutally repressed a December 16, 1982, demonstration in Buenos Aires' central Plaza de Mayo, resulting in the death of one protester and Bignone's hopes for an indefinite postponement of elections. Devoting themselves to damage control, the regime began preparing for the transition by shredding evidence of their murder of between 15,000 and 30,000 dissidents (most of which were students, academics and labor union personnel uninvolved in the violence Argentina suffered from 1973 to 1976). Hoping to quiet demands that their whereabouts be known, in February 1983 Buenos Aires Police Chief Ramón Camps publicly recognized the crime and asserted that the "disappeared" were, in fact, dead. Provoking popular indignation, Camps' interview forced President Bignone to cease denying the tragedy and, on April 28, declare a blanket amnesty for those involved (including himself).

== Nominations ==
Among the first prominent political figures to condemn the amnesty was the leader of the UCR's progressive wing, Raúl Alfonsín, who easily secured his party's nomination during its convention in July. Alfonsín chose as his running mate Víctor Martínez, a more conservative UCR figure from Córdoba Province. Their traditional opponents, the Justicialist Party, struggled to find candidates for not only the top of the ticket, but a number of the more important local races, as well. Following conferences that dragged on for two months after the UCR nominated Alfonsín, the Justicialists' left wing (the target of much of the repression before and after the 1976 coup) proved little match for the CGT's influence within the party. They nominated ideological opposites Ítalo Luder, who had served as acting president during Isabel Perón's September 1975 sick leave, for president, and former Chaco Province Governor Deolindo Bittel as his running mate; whereas Luder had authorized repression against the left in 1975, Bittel was a populist renowned for his defense of Habeas Corpus during the subsequent dictatorship.

== Campaign issues ==
Constrained by time, Alfonsín focused his strategy on accusing the Justicialists, who had refused to condemn Bignone's military amnesty, of enjoying the dictator's tacit support. Alfonsín enjoyed the valuable support of a number of Argentine intellectuals and artists, including playwright Carlos Gorostiza, who devised the UCR candidate's slogan, Ahora, Alfonsín ("Now is the Time for Alfonsín").

Luder, aware of intraparty tensions, limited his campaign ads and rhetoric largely to an evocation of the founder of the Justicialist Party, Juan Perón. Polls gave neither man an edge for the contest, which was scheduled for October 30. A few days before the elections (which had a record turnout), the Justicialist candidate for Governor of Buenos Aires Province, Herminio Iglesias, threw a (premature) "victory rally" in which a coffin draped in the UCR colors was burned before the television cameras.

The bonfire ignited the electorate's bitter memories of Isabel Perón's tenure and helped result in a solid victory for the UCR. The Peronists were given a majority in the Senate and 12 of 22 governorships. The UCR secured only seven governors, though the nation's largest province, Buenos Aires, would be governed by the UCR's Alejandro Armendáriz. Alfonsín persuaded Bignone after the elections to bring forward the inauguration to December 10, 1983.

== Presidential candidates ==
- Radical Civic Union (centrist/social democrat): Former Deputy Raúl Alfonsín of Buenos Aires.
- Justicialist Party (populist): Former Senator Ítalo Luder of Santa Fe.
- Intransigent Party (socialist) : Former Governor Oscar Alende of Buenos Aires.
- Integration and Development Movement (developmentalist): Economist Rogelio Julio Frigerio of Buenos Aires.
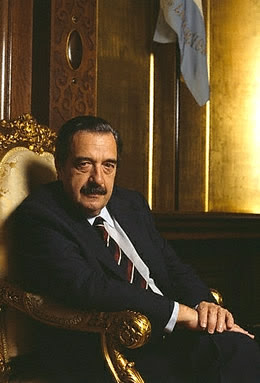
Alfonsín

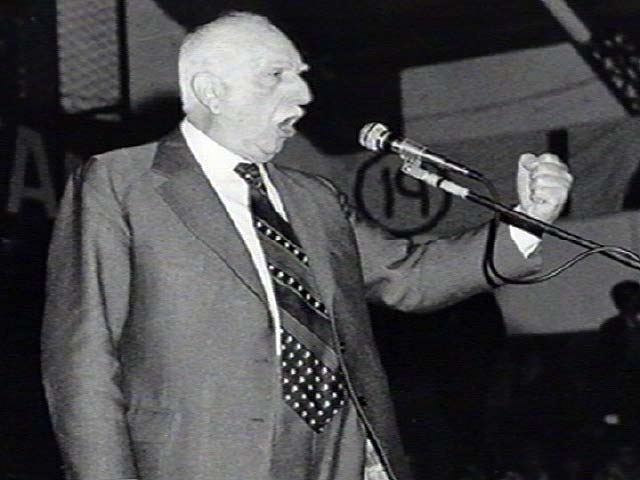
Alende

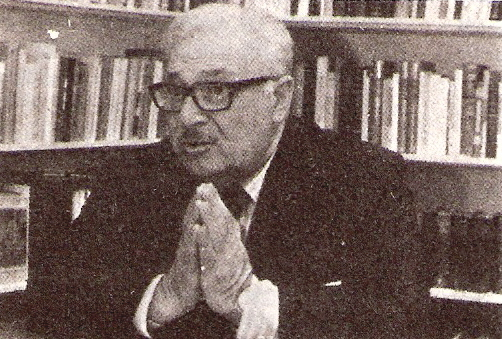
Frigerio

== Results ==
The Alfonsín–Martínez ticket won the election with 52% of the vote against the 40% of the Luder–Bittel ticket. Alfonsín's 52% vote share would be broken by Cristina Fernández de Kirchner's record of 54% in 2011.

=== President ===
Candidate	Running mate	Party or alliance		Popular vote		Electoral vote	
Candidate	Running mate	Party or alliance		Votes	%	Votes	%
Raúl Alfonsín	Víctor Hipólito Martínez	Radical Civic Union		7,724,559	51.75	317	52.83
Ítalo Argentino Luder	Deolindo Bittel	Justicialist Party		5,995,402	40.16	259	43.17
Oscar Alende	Mirto Lisandro Viale	Intransigent Party		347,654	2.33	2	0.33
Rogelio Julio Frigerio	Antonio Salonia	Integration and Development Movement		177,426	1.19	2	0.33
Francisco Manrique	Guillermo Belgrano Rawson	Manrique– Rawson	Federal Alliance	59,045	0.40		
Francisco Manrique	Guillermo Belgrano Rawson	Manrique– Rawson	Democratic Party of Mendoza	17,192	0.12		
Francisco Manrique	Guillermo Belgrano Rawson	Manrique– Rawson	Democratic Party of Córdoba	12,232	0.08		
Francisco Manrique	Guillermo Belgrano Rawson	Manrique– Rawson	Federal Party	8,129	0.05		
Francisco Manrique	Guillermo Belgrano Rawson	Manrique– Rawson	Popular Line Movement	6,365	0.04		
Francisco Manrique	Guillermo Belgrano Rawson	Manrique– Rawson	Democratic Party of Entre Ríos	4,225	0.03		
Francisco Manrique	Guillermo Belgrano Rawson	Manrique– Rawson	Total	107,188	0.72		
No candidate	No candidate	Autonomist–Liberal Alliance		104,052	0.70	6	1.00
Álvaro Alsogaray	Jorge Salvador Oría	Alsogaray– Oría	Union of the Democratic Centre	52,526	0.35		
Álvaro Alsogaray	Jorge Salvador Oría	Alsogaray– Oría	Centre National Confederation	8,736	0.06		
Álvaro Alsogaray	Jorge Salvador Oría	Alsogaray– Oría	Centre Party	1,592	0.01		
Álvaro Alsogaray	Jorge Salvador Oría	Alsogaray– Oría	Total	62,854	0.42		
No candidate	No candidate	Blockist Party of San Juan		58,038	0.39	4	0.67
Rafael Martínez Raymonda	René H. Balestra	Democratic– Socialist; Alliance	Democratic–Socialist Alliance	47,692	0.32		
Rafael Martínez Raymonda	René H. Balestra	Democratic– Socialist; Alliance	Democratic Progressive Party	2,227	0.01		
Rafael Martínez Raymonda	René H. Balestra	Democratic– Socialist; Alliance	Democratic Socialist Party	265	0.00		
Rafael Martínez Raymonda	René H. Balestra	Democratic– Socialist; Alliance	Total	50,184	0.34		
Francisco Eduardo Cerro	Arturo Ponsati	Christian Democratic Party		46,544	0.31		
Luis Zamora	Silvia Díaz	Movimiento al Socialismo		42,500	0.28		
No candidate	No candidate	Neuquén People's Movement		30,546	0.20	4	0.67
No candidate	No candidate	Three Flags Party		22,583	0.15	1	0.17
No candidate	No candidate	Jujuy People's Movement		22,303	0.15	2	0.33
Guillermo Estévez Boero	Edgardo Rossi	Popular Socialist Party		21,177	0.14		
No candidate	No candidate	Salta Renewal Party		18,844	0.13	1	0.17
No candidate	No candidate	Pampa Federalist Movement		15,298	0.10	2	0.33
Jorge Abelardo Ramos	Elisa Margarita Colombo	Popular Left Front		14,093	0.09		
Gregorio Flores	Catalina Guagnini	Workers' Party		13,067	0.09		
No candidate	No candidate	Federal Vanguard		12,373	0.08		
No candidate	No candidate	Renewal Crusade		5,539	0.04		
No candidate	No candidate	Catamarca People's Movement		4,464	0.03		
No candidate	No candidate	Popular Line Movement		4,044	0.03		
No candidate	No candidate	Salta Popular Movement		3,197	0.02		
No candidate	No candidate	Salta Alliance		3,089	0.02		
No candidate	No candidate	Conservative Principist Party		3,000	0.02		
No candidate	No candidate	Chaco Unity Movement		2,853	0.02		
No candidate	No candidate	The People's Voice		2,735	0.02		
No candidate	No candidate	Chubut Action Party		2,640	0.02		
No candidate	No candidate	Popular Alliance		2,568	0.02		
No candidate	No candidate	Socialist Party		2,289	0.02		
No candidate	No candidate	Río Negro Provincial Party		1,113	0.01		
No candidate	No candidate	Popular Union		934	0.01		
No candidate	No candidate	Authentic Socialist Party		585	0.00		
No candidate	No candidate	Renewal Party		448	0.00		
No candidate	No candidate	Democratic Party of Catamarca		401	0.00		
No candidate	No candidate	Nationalist Movement		394	0.00		
No candidate	No candidate	Provincial Defence–White Flag		264	0.00		
No candidate	No candidate	Party for Social Democracy		257	0.00		
No candidate	No candidate	Conservative People's Party		13	0.00		
Total				14,927,512	100.00	600	100.00
Valid votes				14,927,512	97.25		
Invalid votes				87,728	0.57		
Blank votes				334,946	2.18		
Total votes				15,350,186	100.00		
Registered voters/turnout				17,929,951	85.61		
Source: DINE, Ministry of the Interior

==== Results by province ====
		Alfonsín/Martínez (UCR)			Luder/Bittel (PJ)			Alende/Viale (PI)			Friegrio/Salonia (MID)			Others			Blank/Invalid		Turnout	
Province	El.	Votes	%	El.	Votes	%	El.	Votes	%	El.	Votes	%	El.	Votes	%	El.	Votes	%	Votes	%
Buenos Aires	144	2,878,858	51.41	79	2,364,585	42.23	65	181,488	3.24	–	47,004	0.84	–	356,099	2.28	–	127,607	2.77	5,759,215	87.69
Buenos Aires City	54	1,269,352	64.26	37	540,389	27.36	15	88,480	4.48	2	14,480	0.73	–	62,556	3.17	–	33,422	1.66	2,008,679	85.78
Catamarca	14	48,595	46.79	7	45,329	43.65	7	602	0.58	–	805	0.78	–	8,526	8.20	–	3,762	3.50	107,619	81.34
Chaco	18	153,971	46.55	9	158,721	47.98	9	1,391	0.42	–	7,141	2.16	–	9,556	2.89	–	10,656	3.12	341,436	75.90
Chubut	14	56,912	50.85	8	46,400	41.46	6	1,957	1.75	–	2,362	2.11	–	4,281	3.82	–	5,167	4.41	117,079	80.63
Córdoba	40	791,470	56.22	23	561,954	39.92	17	12,245	0.87	–	13,078	0.93	–	29,089	2.06	–	33,381	2.32	1,441,217	88.35
Corrientes	18	112,216	33.84	7	94,105	28.38	5	2,467	0.74	–	11,662	3.52	–	111,117	33.51	6	8,232	2.42	339,799	77.26
Entre Ríos	22	251,811	49.53	12	224,778	44.21	10	7,558	1.49	–	7,949	1.56	–	16,301	3.21	–	11,769	2.26	520,166	83.70
Formosa	14	45,065	37.20	5	54,660	45.12	7	560	0.46	–	16,680	13.77	2	4,188	3.46	–	5,369	4.24	126,522	75.92
Jujuy	16	61,173	35.46	6	84,051	48.72	8	877	0.51	–	1,421	0.82	–	24,979	14.48	2	8,852	4.88	181,353	84.32
La Pampa	14	50,753	41.38	6	50,138	40.88	6	1,922	1.57	–	3,294	2.69	–	16,540	13.48	2	5,350	4.18	127,997	89.52
La Rioja	14	35,534	41.04	6	48,073	55.52	8	462	0.53	–	1,588	1.83	–	925	1.08	–	9,285	9.69	95,867	89.31
Mendoza	24	368,484	57.81	15	233,035	36.56	9	6,073	0.95	–	7,233	1.13	–	22,566	3.55	–	11,680	1.80	649,071	86.63
Misiones	18	118,676	49.56	9	114,454	47.79	9	738	0.31	–	3,885	1.62	–	1,717	0.72	–	11,359	4.53	250,829	80.15
Neuquén	14	48,279	45.31	7	23,653	22.20	3	2,114	1.98	–	904	0.85	–	31,594	29.66	4	6,006	5.34	112,550	86.80
Río Negro	14	84,226	53.57	8	62,801	39.94	6	2,868	1.82	–	2,616	1.66	–	4,725	3.01	–	10,447	6.23	167,683	85.84
Salta	18	135,398	44.62	8	137,369	45.27	9	1,340	0.44	–	1,774	0.58	–	27,537	9.08	1	7,677	2.47	311,095	80.07
San Juan	16	98,916	40.23	7	75,368	30.65	5	2,152	0.88	–	2,940	1.20	–	66,505	27.04	4	4,724	1.89	250,605	86.40
San Luis	14	58,723	48.58	8	50,095	41.44	6	549	0.45	–	4,434	3.67	–	7,075	5.86	–	4,138	3.31	125,014	84.99
Santa Cruz	14	19,077	44.01	7	22,324	51.50	7	668	1.54	–	844	1.95	–	437	1.01	–	1,850	4.09	45,200	82.22
Santa Fe	42	719,186	50.21	23	615,007	42.94	19	26,835	1.52	–	20,519	1.43	–	50,672	3.89	–	47,401	3.20	1,479,620	88.28
Santiago del Estero	18	109,012	40.57	8	130,411	48.53	9	1,146	0.43	–	1,106	0.41	–	27,030	10.06	1	8,794	3.17	277,499	69.89
Tierra del Fuego	4	5,410	50.40	2	4,180	38.94	2	406	3.78	–	329	3.07	–	409	3.81	–	3,166	22.78	13,900	90.56
Tucumán	22	203,462	41.55	10	253,522	51.78	12	2,756	0.56	–	3,378	0.69	–	26,539	5.42	–	10,514	2.10	500,171	81.67
Total	600	7,724,559	51.75	317	5,995,402	40.16	259	347,654	2.33	2	177,426	1.19	2	682,471	4.57	20	422,674	2.75	15,350,186	85.61

=== Chamber of Deputies ===
Party	Votes	%	Seats		
Party	Votes	%	1983–1985	1983–1987	Total
Radical Civic Union	7,104,748	47.97	64	65	129
Justicialist Party	5,697,610	38.47	56	55	111
Intransigent Party	411,883	2.78	2	1	3
Union of the Democratic Centre	251,541	1.70	1	1	2
Integration and Development Movement	223,763	1.51	0	0	0
Communist Party of Argentina	182,296	1.23	0	0	0
Federal Alliance	169,585	1.14	0	0	0
Christian Democratic Party	139,881	0.94	0	1	1
Democratic–Socialist Alliance	125,085	0.84	0	0	0
Autonomist Party of Corrientes	67,259	0.45	0	1	1
Blockist Party of San Juan	61,737	0.42	1	1	2
Movimiento al Socialismo	56,193	0.38	0	0	0
Liberal Party of Corrientes	46,223	0.31	1	0	1
Neuquén People's Movement	36,168	0.24	1	1	2
Popular Socialist Party	35,631	0.24	0	0	0
Jujuy People's Movement	26,535	0.18	0	1	1
Three Flags Party	24,923	0.17	0	0	0
Salta Renewal Party	22,453	0.15	0	0	0
Popular Left Front	18,750	0.13	0	0	0
Federal Vanguard–Christian Democratic Party	17,926	0.12	0	0	0
Workers' Party	17,720	0.12	0	0	0
Pampa Federalist Movement	16,490	0.11	1	0	1
Catamarca People's Movement	10,049	0.07	0	0	0
Renewal Crusade	7,065	0.05	0	0	0
Chubut Action Party	5,544	0.04	0	0	0
Popular Alliance	5,377	0.04	0	0	0
Salta Alliance	4,656	0.03	0	0	0
Conservative Principist Party	3,728	0.03	0	0	0
Salta Popular Movement	3,387	0.02	0	0	0
Chaco Unity Movement	3,254	0.02	0	0	0
The People's Voice	3,075	0.02	0	0	0
Socialist Party	2,573	0.02	0	0	0
Neighborhood Association – Fuegian Popular Union	1,940	0.01	0	0	0
Popular Union	1,490	0.01	0	0	0
Río Negro Provincial Party	1,453	0.01	0	0	0
Authentic Socialist Party	797	0.01	0	0	0
Democratic Party of Catamarca	688	0.00	0	0	0
Renewal Party	587	0.00	0	0	0
Nationalist Movement	474	0.00	0	0	0
Provincial Defence–White Flag	415	0.00	0	0	0
Party for Social Democracy	266	0.00	0	0	0
Conservative People's Party	13	0.00	0	0	0
Total	14,811,231	100.00	127	127	254
Valid votes	14,811,231	96.49			
Invalid votes	87,199	0.57			
Blank votes	451,756	2.94			
Total votes	15,350,186	100.00			
Registered voters/turnout	17,929,951	85.61			
Source: DINE, Ministry of the Interior

==== Results by province ====
Province	UCR			PJ			Others		
Province	Votes	%	Seats	Votes	%	Seats	Votes	%	Seats
Buenos Aires	2,743,064	49.38	37	2,239,629	40.32	31	571,969	10.30	2
Buenos Aires City	967,275	49.47	14	460,952	23.57	7	527,197	26.96	4
Catamarca	43,008	41.81	2	43,096	41.89	3	16,764	16.30	0
Chaco	151,976	45.96	3	157,302	47.57	4	21,372	6.46	0
Chubut	52,791	47.75	3	44,991	40.69	2	12,784	11.56	0
Córdoba	773,659	55.06	11	549,929	39.14	7	81,524	5.80	0
Corrientes	101,345	31.35	3	82,463	25.51	2	139,470	43.14	2
Entre Ríos	243,652	48.24	5	218,044	43.17	4	43,338	8.58	0
Formosa	44,129	36.55	2	54,280	44.96	3	22,326	18.49	0
Jujuy	56,133	32.70	2	82,737	48.20	3	32,789	19.10	1
La Pampa	48,870	40.00	2	49,133	40.22	2	24,171	19.78	1
La Rioja	35,226	40.75	2	47,416	54.86	3	3,796	4.39	0
Mendoza	351,001	55.26	6	225,488	35.50	4	58,676	9.24	0
Misiones	118,055	49.36	4	113,615	47.50	3	7,514	3.14	0
Neuquén	40,925	39.00	2	22,681	21.61	1	41,326	39.38	2
Río Negro	81,879	52.64	3	60,952	39.18	2	12,721	8.18	0
Salta	126,119	42.03	3	135,236	45.07	4	38,684	12.89	0
San Juan	91,874	37.65	2	73,389	30.07	2	78,782	32.28	2
San Luis	53,926	45.32	3	48,914	41.11	2	16,137	13.56	0
Santa Cruz	18,957	43.70	2	21,865	50.41	3	2,554	5.89	0
Santa Fe	657,272	46.42	10	585,323	41.34	9	173,216	12.23	0
Santiago del Estero	103,225	38.61	3	127,388	47.65	4	36,745	13.74	0
Tierra del Fuego	3,730	35.99	1	3,654	35.26	1	2,979	28.75	0
Tucumán	196,657	40.31	4	249,133	51.07	5	42,039	8.62	0
Total	7,104,748	47.97	129	5,697,610	38.47	111	2,008,873	13.56	14

=== Senate ===
Party	Seats			
Party	1983–1986	1983–1989	1983–1992	Total
Justicialist Party	7	7	6	20
Radical Civic Union	6	6	6	18
Neuquén People's Movement	0	1	1	2
Blockist Party of San Juan	1	0	1	2
Autonomist Party of Corrientes	1	0	0	1
Liberal Party of Corrientes	0	1	0	1
Integration and Development Movement	0	1	0	1
Conservative People's Party	0	0	1	1
Total	15	16	15	46

==== Results by province ====
Province	PJ	UCR	MPN	PB	PACo	PLCo	MID	PCP
Buenos Aires	0	2	0	0	0	0	0	0
Buenos Aires City	0	2	0	0	0	0	0	0
Catamarca	1	0	0	0	0	0	0	1
Chaco	1	1	0	0	0	0	0	0
Chubut	0	2	0	0	0	0	0	0
Córdoba	0	2	0	0	0	0	0	0
Corrientes	0	0	0	0	1	1	0	0
Entre Ríos	0	2	0	0	0	0	0	0
Formosa	1	0	0	0	0	0	1	0
Jujuy	2	0	0	0	0	0	0	0
La Pampa	1	1	0	0	0	0	0	0
La Rioja	2	0	0	0	0	0	0	0
Mendoza	0	2	0	0	0	0	0	0
Misiones	0	2	0	0	0	0	0	0
Neuquén	0	0	2	0	0	0	0	0
Río Negro	0	2	0	0	0	0	0	0
Salta	2	0	0	0	0	0	0	0
San Juan	0	0	0	2	0	0	0	0
San Luis	2	0	0	0	0	0	0	0
Santa Cruz	2	0	0	0	0	0	0	0
Santa Fe	2	0	0	0	0	0	0	0
Santiago del Estero	2	0	0	0	0	0	0	0
Tucumán	2	0	0	0	0	0	0	0
Total	20	18	2	2	1	1	1	1

=== Provincial Governors ===
Election of Provincial Governors
Elected: 22 provincial governors, 24 legislative bodies Presidential appointment: Mayor of the City of Buenos Aires and Territorial Governor of Tierra del Fuego
Province	Elected	Party	Map
Buenos Aires	Alejandro Armendáriz	Radical Civic Union	
Catamarca	Ramón Saadi	Justicialist Party	
Chaco	Florencio Tenev	Justicialist Party	
Chubut	Atilio Viglione	Radical Civic Union	
Córdoba	Eduardo Angeloz	Radical Civic Union	
Corrientes	José Antonio Romero Feris	Autonomist Party	
Entre Ríos	Sergio Montiel	Radical Civic Union	
Formosa	Floro Bogado	Justicialist Party	
Jujuy	Carlos Snopek	Justicialist Party	
La Pampa	Rubén Marín	Justicialist Party	
La Rioja	Carlos Menem	Justicialist Party	
Mendoza	Santiago Llaver	Radical Civic Union	
Misiones	Ricardo Barrios Arrechea	Radical Civic Union	
Neuquén	Felipe Sapag	Neuquén People's Movement	
Río Negro	Osvaldo Álvarez Guerrero	Radical Civic Union	
Salta	Roberto Romero	Justicialist Party	
San Juan	Leopoldo Bravo	Blockist Party	
San Luis	Adolfo Rodríguez Saá	Justicialist Party	
Santa Cruz	Arturo Puricelli	Justicialist Party	
Santa Fe	José María Vernet	Justicialist Party	
Santiago del Estero	Carlos Juárez	Justicialist Party	
Tucumán	Fernando Riera	Justicialist Party	
Buenos Aires City	Julio César Saguier	Radical Civic Union	
Tierra del Fuego	Ramón Alberto Trejo Noel	Radical Civic Union	

== Bibliography ==
- Burns, Jimmy (1987). The land that lost its heroes: the Falklands, the post-war, and Alfonsín. London: Bloomsbury Publishing Ltd. ISBN 0-7475-0002-9.
