= Víctor Hipólito Martínez =

Argentine lawyer and politician

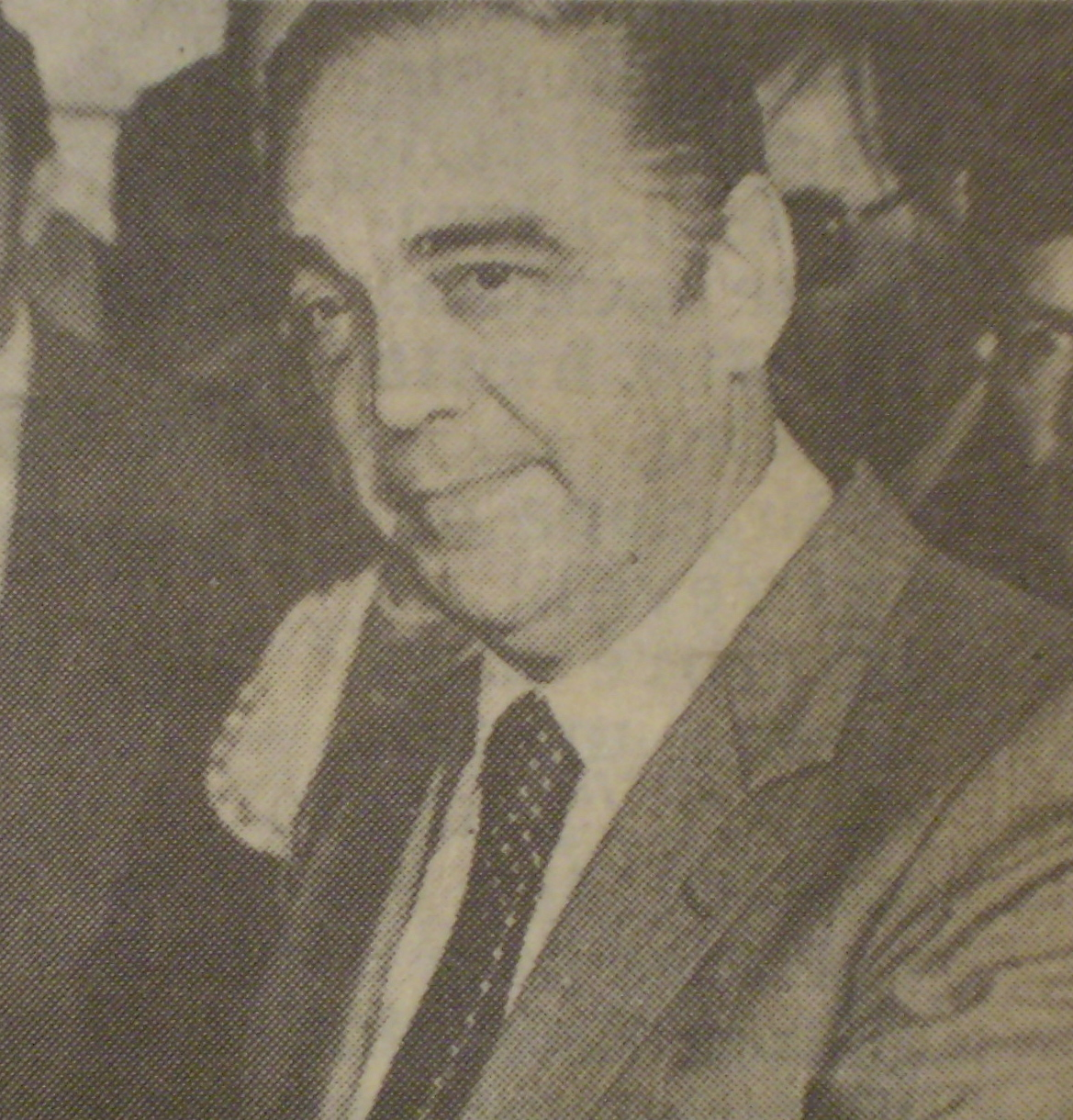

29th Vice President of Argentina
- In office December 10, 1983 – July 8, 1989
- President: Raúl Alfonsín
- Preceded by: Isabel Martínez de Perón (1974)
- Succeeded by: Eduardo Duhalde

Intendant of Córdoba
- In office October 12, 1963 – June 28, 1966
- Preceded by: Vito Remo Roggio
- Succeeded by: Emilio Carlos Casares

Personal details
- Born: November 21, 1924 Córdoba, Argentina
- Died: November 20, 2017 (aged 92) Villa Allende, Córdoba
- Party: Radical Civic Union
- Spouse: Fanny Mónica Munté
- Children: 3
- Education: National University of Córdoba

Víctor Hipólito Martínez (Spanish pronunciation: [ˈbiɣtoɾ maɾˈtines]; November 21, 1924 – November 20, 2017) was an Argentine lawyer and politician, best known for his role as vice president during Raúl Alfonsín's 1983–1989 tenure.

== Life and times ==
Martínez was born and raised in Córdoba, Argentina. He enrolled in the National University of Córdoba, received a law degree in 1948 and in 1955, he participated in a Southern Methodist University conference on fossil fuel policy. He began teaching land law at his alma mater in 1956 and earning a juris doctor, in 1957. Active in the centrist Radical Civic Union (UCR), Martínez entered politics and was elected to the Provincial Senate, in 1962. He was elected Mayor of Córdoba in 1963 and remained in the post until a coup d'état removed President Arturo Illia (a fellow UCR figure), in 1966.

Martínez returned to academia and edited Los Principios, a local news daily, from 1970 to 1972. During new elections in 1973, he ran unsuccessfully for Governor of Córdoba Province. Continuing to teach at the university, he served on government advisory panels on the local, provincial, and national levels on the subject of land law. He established the Argentine Society of Natural Resource Law and Management and was named Dean of the Land Law Department at the University of Córdoba, in 1979.

Following seven years of a failed military dictatorship, elections were called for October 1983. The UCR, which held its convention in July of that year, nominated a center-left former Congressman and human rights lawyer, Raúl Alfonsín, for president and Martínez (who, as a somewhat more conservative figure, would help balance the ticket) for vice president. Following weeks of tied polling with the Justicialist Party, the UCR won the elections by 12%, and Martínez was elected vice president.

Sworn in on December 10, Martínez's role as President of the Argentine Senate became critical given the Justicialists' advantage of 21 Senators to the UCR's 18. He was unable, however, to prevent their defeat of Alfonsín's Labor Union Reform Law of 1984 or of the proposed, 1987 transfer of the nation's capital to Viedma (both, key issues to the President). Martínez made numerous diplomatic visits abroad as vice president. He was designated Honorary Citizen of California by Governor George Deukmejian, in 1985, and was made an Honorary Member of the Inter-American Bar Association, in 1986. Ultimately, however, a sharp currency crisis and sudden rioting forced Alfonsín to advance the planned, December 1989 inaugural of his successor, Carlos Menem, by five months, and Martínez tendered his resignation on June 30 (effective Alfonsín's July 8 handover).

He resumed his land law practice afterwards and received numerous international awards, including the Grand Cross of the Crown of Italy. He later served as Ambassador to Peru during President Fernando de la Rúa's 1999–2001 administration.

Martínez was given the place of honor during the memorial service to President Raúl Alfonsín, who died on March 31, 2009. A niece of his, Pilar Nores Bodereau, married Alan García (who would twice be elected President of Peru), in 1978.

Martínez died in a Villa Allende, Córdoba, clinic on 20 November 2017, one day short of his 93rd birthday.

Political offices
Preceded by Isabel Perón	Vice President of Argentina; 1983–1989	Succeeded by Eduardo Duhalde
