= Antonio Cafiero =

Argentine politician

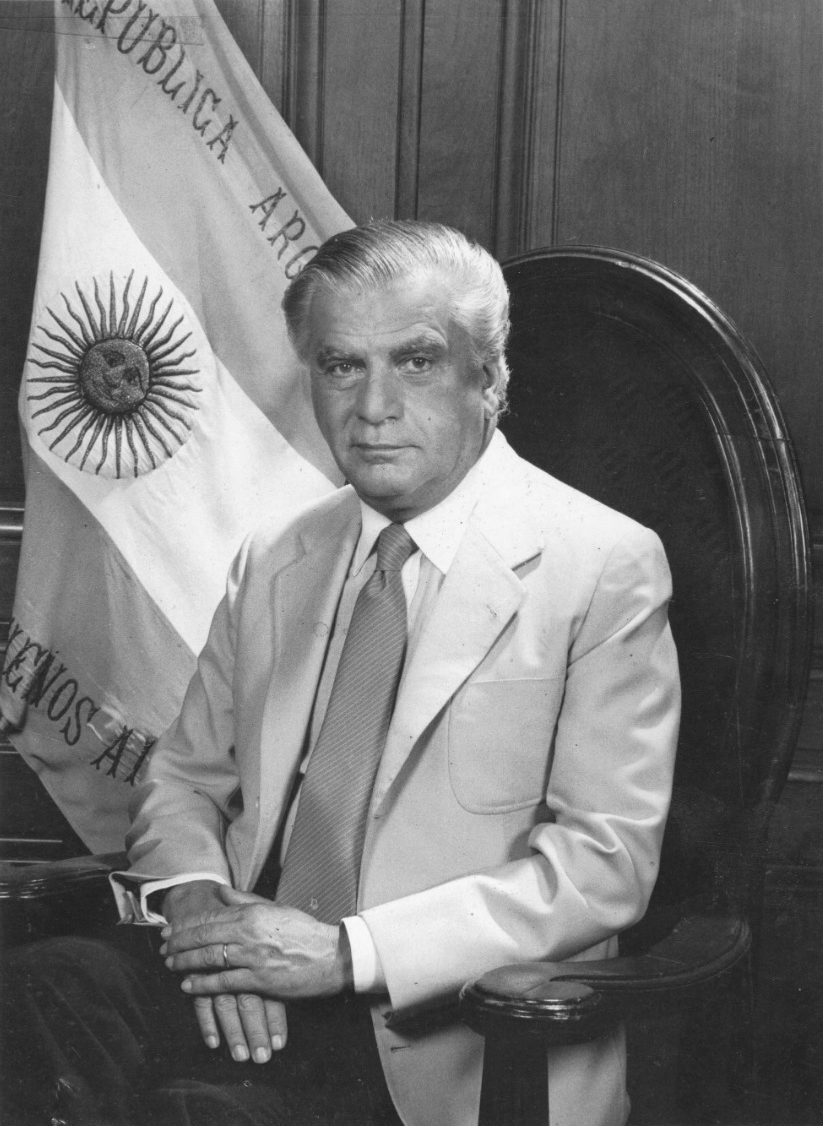
- Official portrait, 1987

National Senator
- In office 10 December 1993 – 10 December 2005
- Constituency: Buenos Aires

7th Chief of the Cabinet of Ministers
- In office 30 December 2001 – 2 January 2002
- President: Eduardo Camaño
- Preceded by: Luis Lusquiños
- Succeeded by: Jorge Capitanich

Governor of Buenos Aires
- In office 10 December 1987 – 10 December 1991
- Lieutenant: Luis María Macaya
- Preceded by: Alejandro Armendáriz
- Succeeded by: Eduardo Duhalde

Personal details
- Born: 12 September 1922 Buenos Aires, Argentina
- Died: 13 October 2014 (aged 92) Buenos Aires, Argentina
- Party: Justicialist Party
- Spouse: Ana Goitía
- Education: University of Buenos Aires
- Profession: Accountant

Antonio Francisco Cafiero (12 September 1922 – 13 October 2014) was an Argentine Justicialist Party politician. Cafiero held a number of important posts throughout his career, including, most notably, the governorship of Buenos Aires Province from 1987 to 1991, the Cabinet Chief's Office under interim president Eduardo Camaño from 2001 to 2002, and a seat in the Senate of the Nation from 1993 to 2005.

== Early and personal life ==
Cafiero was born in Buenos Aires. He joined Catholic Action in 1938, and enrolled at the University of Buenos Aires, becoming President of the Students' Association. He graduated as an accountant in 1944, and earned a Doctor in Economic Sciences in 1948, teaching in the discipline as a professor from 1952 to 1984. Cafiero became a militant Peronist from the 17 October 1945 mass demonstrations in support of populist leader Juan Perón, and entered public service in 1952 as Minister of Foreign Trade in the latter's administration, serving until 1954. He married the former Ana Goitía, and they had ten children.

Cafiero lost his wife of fifty years, Ana Goitía, in 1994. His son, Juan Pablo Cafiero, was appointed as Ambassador to the Holy See in 2008. He had been a national deputy for the Peronists and for FrePaSo, Minister for Social Development under Presidents Fernando de la Rúa and Eduardo Duhalde, and as Minister of Security for Buenos Aires Province. Another son, Mario Cafiero, served as a National Deputy from 1997 to 2005. His grandson, Santiago Cafiero (Juan Pablo's son) served as Cabinet Chief and Foreign Minister.

== Political career ==
Cafiero held offices in the National Justicialist Movement from 1962, as well as in different institutions within the Justicialist Party at the national level and in Buenos Aires Province. Following the return of Peronists to power in the 1973 elections, Cafiero was appointed Secretary of Commerce in Perón's last term (1974). Following Perón's death and his replacement by his wife, Vice-President Isabel Perón, he was appointed Federal Interventor of Mendoza Province (1974–1975), and as Ambassador to the European Economic Community and Belgium (1975). Cafiero was appointed Economy Minister in August. He grappled with the aftermath of the June 1975 Rodrigazo (economic shock treatment enacted by a predecessor) with no success, and he was dismissed in February 1976, serving briefly as Ambassador to the Holy See until the March 1976 coup.

=== Governor of Buenos Aires ===
He founded the Movement for Unity, Solidarity and Organization in September 1982, a reformist faction of the Justicialist Party, ahead of the 1983 return of democracy. The group, known as Renovación Peronista (Peronist Renewal), was defeated in the party's September 1983 nominating convention, however, by more conservative figures supported by Lorenzo Miguel of the Steelworkers' Union. Cafiero was elected to the Argentine Chamber of Deputies in 1985, and in 1987, Governor of Buenos Aires Province. Elected President of the Justicialist Party National Council, he ran in the May 1988 primary election for the upcoming presidential campaign. He failed to regain the support of the CGT, or to sway delegates from the smaller provinces, and lost to less well-known Carlos Menem, who subsequently won the 1989 general election.

=== Later career ===
Menem appointed Cafiero Ambassador to Chile in 1992, and Cafiero returned to elected office as a Senator in 1993. He took part in the convention negotiating the 1994 amendment of the Argentine Constitution, which allowed for Menem's re-election. The amended Argentine Constitution included article 129, which guaranteed Buenos Aires greater self-governance. The Indentente (appointed Mayor) was replaced by a Jefe de Gobierno (elected Mayor), and the city council by the Buenos Aires City Legislature. Shortly before the historic, June 30, 1996, elections to these posts, however, Senator Cafiero succeeded in limiting the city's autonomy by advancing National Law 24.588, which reserved control of the Argentine Federal Police (the federally administered city force), the Port of Buenos Aires and other faculties to the national government. The controversial bill, popularly known afterward as Ley Cafiero (the "Cafiero Law") was signed in 1996 by President Menem, remaining a sticking point between successive Presidents (most of whom have been Peronist) and Buenos Aires Mayors (none of whom have been).

Cafiero was re-elected as Senator in 2001. The aging lawmaker, who had severe hearing loss by then, took leave to act as Cabinet Chief during the transitional presidency of Eduardo Camaño (2001–02), returning to the Senate and retiring in 2005.

Cafiero was formally accused in 2006, along with Isabel Perón and several of her former ministers, of involvement in the forced disappearance of a minor in 1976. President Isabel Perón and her cabinet had signed decrees on October 6, 1975, ordering "military and security operations that may be needed to annihilate subversive elements throughout the territory of the country" (see Dirty War for historical context). Cafiero, during the Trial of the Juntas in 1985, had stated that the Isabel Perón government (which presided over the early phase of the Dirty War) believed that common police tactics were not enough to combat the guerrilla threat, and that he learned of human rights violations committed at the time only after Perón's overthrow in the March 1976 coup d'état.

Cafiero served as President of COPPPAL, the Permanent Conference of Political Parties of Latin America and the Caribbean, from 2005 to 2011.

He died on 13 October 2014 in Buenos Aires.

Preceded by Alejandro Armendáriz	Governor of Buenos Aires; 1987–1991	Succeeded by Eduardo Duhalde
Preceded by Luis Lusquiños	Chief of Cabinet of Ministers; 2001–2002	Succeeded by Jorge Capitanich
