= Hilda González de Duhalde =

Argentine politician (born 1946)

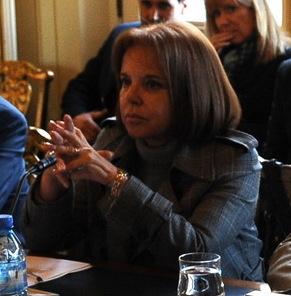
- Chiche Duhalde in Casa Rosada, 2009

National Senator
- In office 10 December 2005 – 10 December 2011
- Constituency: Buenos Aires

First Lady of Argentina interim
- In role 2 January 2002 – 25 May 2003
- President: Eduardo Duhalde
- Preceded by: María Alicia Mazzarino (interim)
- Succeeded by: Cristina Fernández de Kirchner

Second Lady of Argentina
- In office 8 July 1989 – 10 December 1991
- Vice President: Eduardo Duhalde
- Preceded by: Fanny Mónica Munté
- Succeeded by: María Zapatero

National Deputy
- In office 10 December 1997 – 10 December 2005
- Constituency: Buenos Aires

Personal details
- Born: 14 October 1946 (age 79) Buenos Aires, Argentina
- Party: Justicialist Party
- Spouse: Eduardo Duhalde (m. 1971)
- Children: 5

Hilda Beatriz González de Duhalde, widely known as Chiche Duhalde, (born 14 October 1946) is an Argentine politician member of the Justicialist Party. She served as a Senator for Buenos Aires Province, and as the First Lady during the presidency of her husband, Eduardo Duhalde.

== Biography ==
González de Duhalde was born in Lomas de Zamora, Buenos Aires Province, and studied to become a teacher. She has five children with her husband. She assisted her husband in his political career and took on several public positions in family and women's policy.

In 1997 Duhalde was elected a National Deputy for Buenos Aires Province, serving again between 2003 and 2005.

During the interim Presidency of her husband, she acted as Minister of Social Welfare and ran the country's food aid programme, a key role in the aftermath of the country's economic crisis.

A member of the Justicialist Party (PJ), Duhalde has nevertheless opposed the government of fellow Peronists Néstor Kirchner. However the official PJ candidate in Buenos Aires Province district for the 2005 senatorial elections, Hilda Duhalde came second to Cristina Fernández de Kirchner, who was to become President of Argentina two years later.
