= Roberto Lavagna =

Argentine economist and politician

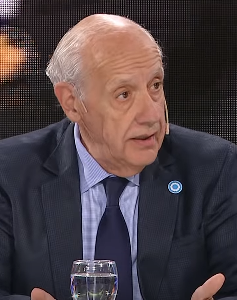
- Lavagna in 2019

Minister of Economy
- In office 27 April 2002 – 28 November 2005
- President: Eduardo Duhalde (2002–03); Néstor Kirchner (2003–05)
- Preceded by: Jorge Remes Lenicov
- Succeeded by: Felisa Miceli

Argentine Ambassador to the European Union
- In office 1 August 2000 – 27 April 2002
- President: Fernando de la Rúa (2000–01); Eduardo Duhalde (2002)
- Preceded by: Jorge Remes Lenicov

Personal details
- Born: 24 March 1942 (age 84) Buenos Aires, Argentina
- Party: Independent (2007–2013, 2019–present)
- Other political affiliations: Justicialist Party (1973–2007); Renewal Front (2013–2019); Federal Consensus (2019–2023); Hacemos por Nuestro País (since 2023)
- Spouse: Claudine Marechal (m. 1970)
- Children: Sergio, Marco and Nicolás
- Education: University of Buenos Aires
- Profession: Economist; Academic

Roberto Lavagna (born 24 March 1942) is an Argentine economist and politician who was Minister of Economy and Production from April 27, 2002, until November 28, 2005.

Despite the fact that he only garnered 6% of the votes in 2019 presidential election and that he lost allies due to his ties with the government, he seeks to consolidate his alliance with the Socialist Party to support the Federal Consensus in the legislative elections of 2021 and increase its presence in Congress.

== Biography ==
=== Early life and career ===
Lavagna was born in the Saavedra section of Buenos Aires in 1942. His father, the owner of a linotype printing shop, relocated the family to the western suburb of Morón a few years later, and Lavagna enrolled at the University of Buenos Aires Faculty of Economic Sciences, where he graduated with a degree in political economy in 1967.

He then obtained a scholarship to study in Belgium, where he earned a graduate degree in econometrics and economic policy. At the university, he met Claudine Marechal, a student from Belgium whom he married in 1970, and with whom he had three children. Lavagna also holds an honorary doctorate from the University of Concepción del Uruguay.

Following the election of Peronist candidate Héctor Cámpora in 1973, Lavagna was named National Director of Price Policy in the Commerce Secretariat, and was shortly afterwards named Director of Incomes Policy by the Economy Minister, José Ber Gelbard; as such he helped oversee a key policy initiative of Gelbard's "Social Pact," which sought to involve management in efforts to control inflation while raising stagnant median wages. Gelbard's resignation in November 1974 led to Lavagna's entry into the private sector following a stint at the Ministry of Public Works, becoming a member of the board of directors of La Cantábrica, a since closed Morón steelmaker, until 1976. He also co-founded Ecolatina, a think tank, in 1975, and was a member of the board of the Institute for Applied Economics and Society (IdEAS), from 1980 to 1990.

Lavagna reentered public service as President Raúl Alfonsín's Secretary of Industry and Foreign Commerce, between 1985 and 1987, during which he helped negotiate the preliminary trade accords with Brazil that later led to the establishment of the Mercosur trade region in 1991. He left the board of Ecolatina in 2000 to accept a post as Ambassador-at-large to international economic conferences, and to the European Union.

=== Minister of Economy ===
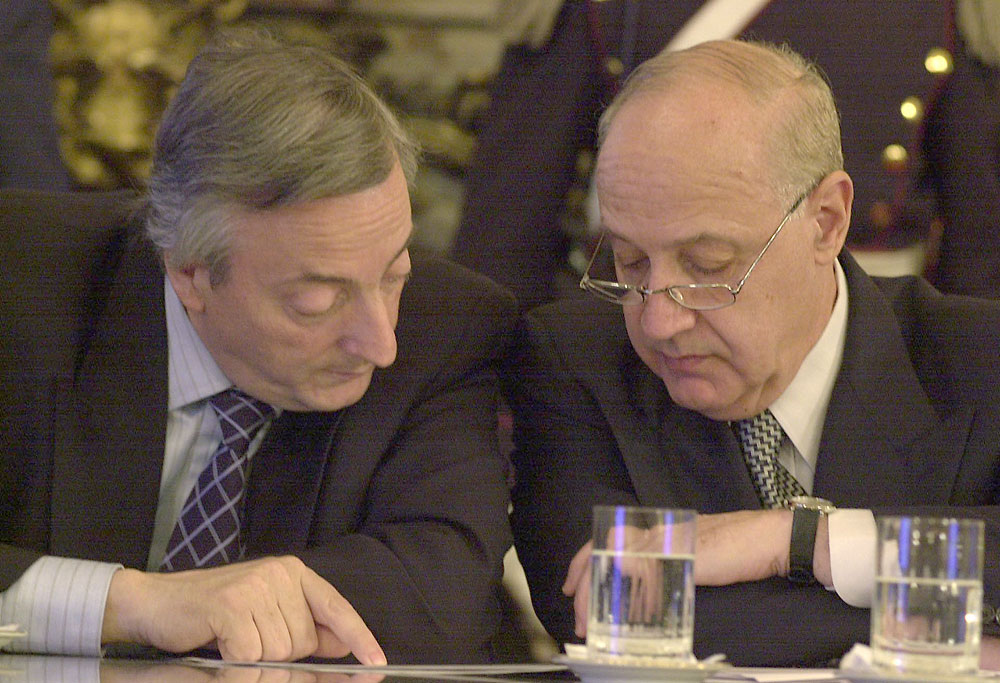
Minister of Economy Lavagna and President Néstor Kirchner in 2004

Lavagna was appointed Minister of Economy by interim President Eduardo Duhalde, on April 27, 2002. Taking office at the depth of the Argentine economic crisis, Lavagna prioritized the planned rescision of the corralito (withdrawal limits on local bank accounts) over the stabilization of the Argentine peso, which had declined by 75% in four months. This put him at odds with the President of the Central Bank, Mario Blejer, who resigned in June. The peso stabilized, however, as foreign trade surpluses mounted, and confidence returned to the Argentine financial system. The corralito was phased out between December 2002 and March 2003, the economy began a vigorous recovery, and Lavagna was confirmed in his post by President Néstor Kirchner upon his taking office in May 2003. Lavagna earned further plaudits from his handling the Argentine debt restructuring, launched on January 14, 2005, by which more than 76% of the defaulted public debt bonds (worth about 93 billion dollars) for longer-term debt, with an important reduction in principal.

Despite these successes, Lavagna was ousted by President Kirchner on November 28, 2005, after persistent rumors followed by official denials. He was replaced by Felisa Miceli, President of Banco de la Nación Argentina and a former student of Lavagna's. The reasons for the forced resignation of the Minister were not made public, though speculations ranged from the failures in fighting inflation to Lavagna's recent accusations of cartelization against certain private companies involved in contracts with the government, which were seen as an indirect attack against Julio de Vido, Minister of Public Works and personally close to the President. Meanwhile, Miceli would go on to resign in 2007 over a money scandal, referred to by the press as toiletgate.

Lavagna only told the press that the President had decided his removal as part of a common post-election renewal. The next day, José Pampuro, former Minister of Defense, admitted that relations between Kirchner and Lavagna had become "complicated" since the elections, and that the situation was "tense" during the week before Lavagna's removal. Off-the-record sources also indicated that Lavagna's independence clashed with Kirchner's desire to have a homogeneous cabinet.

=== 2007 candidacy and later ===
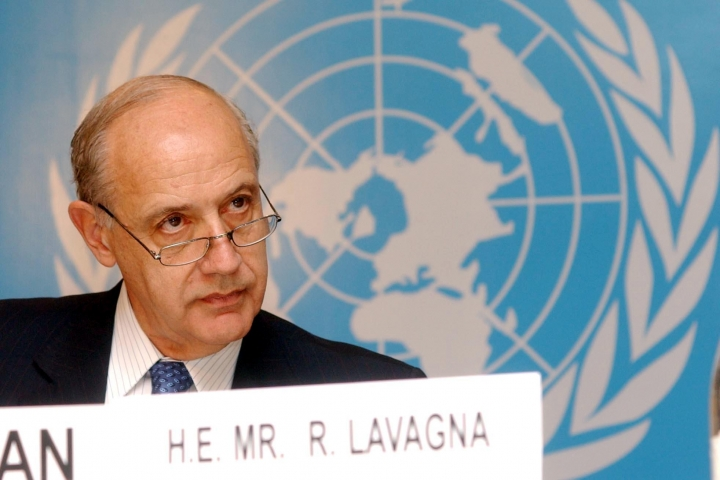
Lavagna in a São Paulo Unctad meeting

Lavagna formed a front, UNA (Una Nacion Avanzada, "An Advanced Nation"), to run against the government's candidate, Cristina Fernández de Kirchner, in the October 2007 presidential elections. Senior members of the Radical Civic Union (UCR), Socialists and Peronist supporters of former President Duhalde voiced support for a coalition behind Lavagna's candidacy, although this proved controversial in all three parties. His plan for his first 100 days of government was based on improving security and employment and reducing poverty.

The UCR endorsed Lavagna in the first election since the party's establishment in 1892 that the UCR ran in a coalition rather than field its own candidate; Gerardo Morales, leader of the UCR, was named Lavagna's running mate (Mrs. Kirchner also had a Radical as her running mate, Mendoza Governor Julio Cobos). Lavagna and UNA came third with over 3 million votes and 17%, behind Fernández and Elisa Carrió, and won solely in Córdoba Province.

Following the 2007 election, Lavagna reached an accord with his former rivals and held talks with Néstor Kirchner over the future of the governing Justicialist Party (PJ). Lavagna was expected to become a vice-president of the Party, seen as a move to widen the base of the party and strengthen Mrs. Kirchner's government; he subsequently declared however that he would not seek a position on the PJ executive. Lavagna later became an opponent of President Fernández de Kirchner, and in 2013 co-founded Unidos Para Cambiar ('United for Change') with three leading opponents of Kirchnerism within the PJ: Córdoba Governor José Manuel de la Sota, Dissident CGT labor federation head Hugo Moyano, and Federal Peronist Congressman Francisco de Narváez.

== See also ==
- Economy of Argentina
- Argentine debt restructuring

== Bibliography ==
- Carlos Liascovich (2007). Lavagna: la biografía. Planeta. ISBN 978-950-49-1783-0.
- Roberto Lavagna (2011). El desafío de la voluntad. Trece meses cruciales en la historia argentina. Penguin Random House: Grupo Editorial Argentina. ISBN 978-950-07-3574-2.

Preceded by Jorge Remes Lenicov	Minister of Economy; 2002–2005	Succeeded by Felisa Miceli
