= Elva Roulet =

Argentine politician (born 1932)

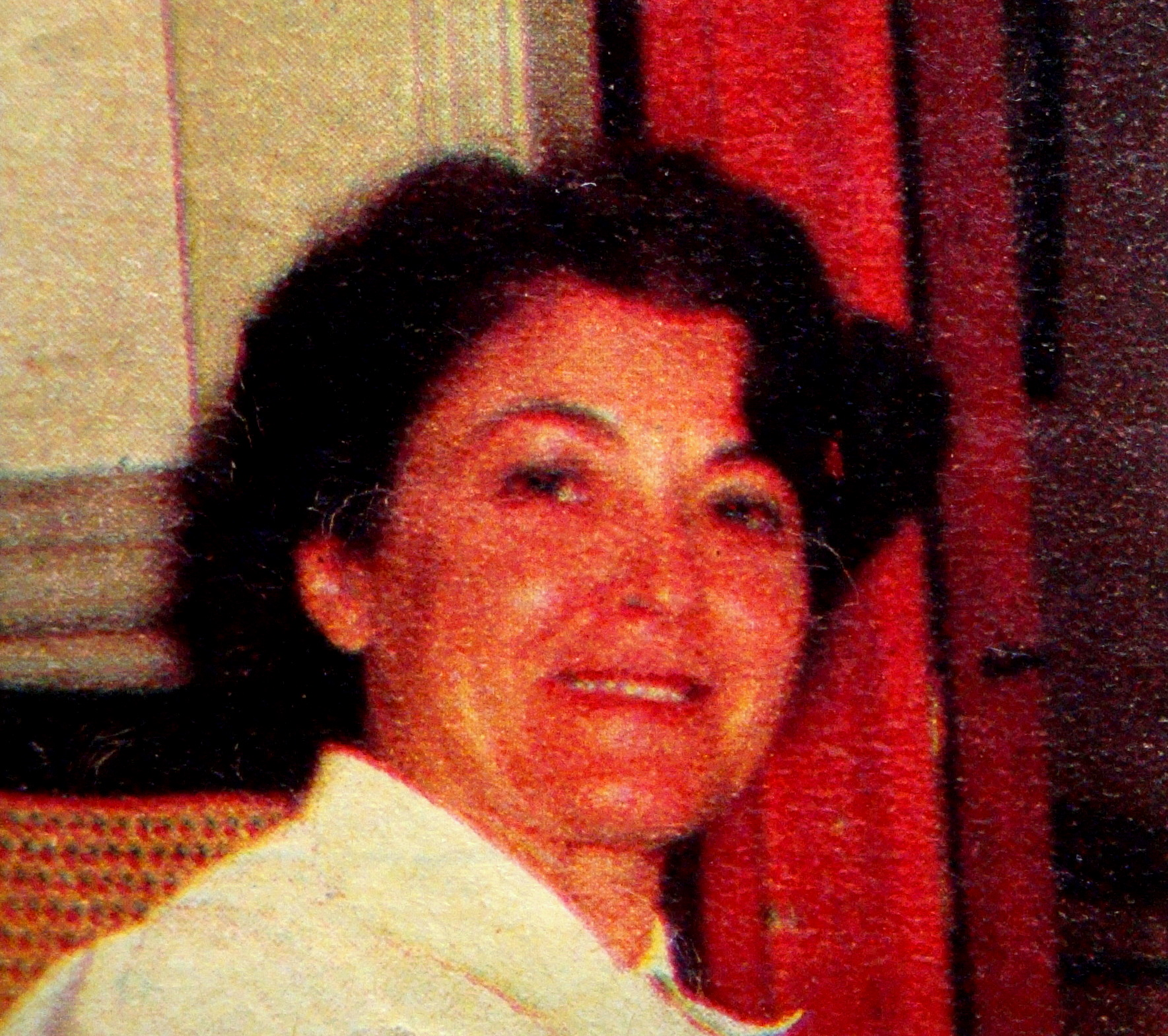

Vice Governor of Buenos Aires
- In office 11 December 1983 – 11 December 1987
- Governor: Alejandro Armendáriz
- Preceded by: Victorio Calabró
- Succeeded by: Luis María Macaya

Personal details
- Born: Elva Pilar Barreiro; 1932 (age 93–94) Juan Nepomuceno Fernández, Buenos Aires Province, Argentina
- Party: Radical Civic Union
- Education: University of Buenos Aires

Elva Pilar Barreiro de Roulet (born 1932), more commonly known as Elva Roulet, is an Argentine architect and politician who was Vice Governor of Buenos Aires Province from 1983 to 1987. She also served as Secretary of Housing and Environmental Structuring of Argentina from 1987 to 1989, during the presidency of Raúl Alfonsín, and as a member of the 1994 Constituent Assembly.

Elected in the Radical Civic Union (UCR) ticket alongside Governor Alejandro Armendáriz, Roulet was the first woman to serve as vice governor and the first woman elected in a gubernatorial ticket of any Argentine province. No other woman would hold that office until 1999, when Mercedes Oviedo was elected Vice Governor of Misiones.

Roulet was born in 1932 in Juan Nepomuceno Fernández, a small town in the Necochea Partido of Buenos Aires Province. She studied architecture at the University of Buenos Aires Faculty of Architecture and Design, graduating in 1957. She then went on to earn a degree on Developmental Social Sciences from the University of Paris. She was married to Jorge Esteban Roulet (1928–1987), an engineer and UCR activist who was dean of the University of Buenos Aires Faculty of Engineering in 1974.

Political offices
Preceded by Victorio Calabró	Vice Governor of Buenos Aires; 1983–1987	Succeeded by Luis María Macaya
