= Coronel Du Graty =

Coordinates: 27°40′S 60°56′W

- City
- Interactive map of Coronel Du Graty
- Country: Argentina
- Province: Chaco
- Department: M. L. J. Fontana

Government
  - Mayor: Juan Carlos Polini
- Elevation: 256 ft (78 m)

Population (2010)
  - Total: 9,015
- Demonym: dugratense
- Time zone: UTC−3 (ART)
- Postal Code: H3541
- Area code: 03735

Coronel Du Graty is a small city and municipality in Chaco Province in northern Argentina. There is no foundation date but the name Coronel Du Graty was assigned by national decree on January 26, 1942 and this date is used as the foundation.

== Name ==
The name of the Belgian Colonel Alfredo Marbais, Baron Du Graty, was awarded on January 26, 1942, by national decree 112.231, signed by Vice President Ramón Castillo, designating it the "railway station" in spot detour km 23.

== History ==
The exact date of foundation, the name of the first settlers or the origin of the town's name is uncertain due to the lack of reliable documentation that certifies the facts and serves as sources to gather significant information about the origins of the town. What is certain is that the railway was the decisive element for the definitive settlement of the settlers and the formation of this locality.2

Some mention that this place was first called Paraje "Ñandubay", then the first settlement was known as "Fortín Encrucijada", and finally "Coronel Du Graty" which prospered through a decree of the national government.

=== Fortin Encrucijada ===
Very close to the present location of the locality of Coronel Du Graty there was a fort called Encrucijada located 10 kilometres away on the present Route N° 95 towards Villa Ángela, Encrucijada was part of the line of forts carried out by Manuel Obligado from Reconquista to subdue the aborigines of the Chaco territories. According to Carlos Primo López Piacentini, this fort was built by commander Juan José Rosetti in 1899. This fortified redoubt is the first construction in the parajes by the national government. It is the result of the lines and outposts of the expeditions carried out towards the centre of the Chaco territory. In the Chaco there were several expeditions divided into columns to achieve the definitive occupation of the Chaco and this fort played a fundamental role in its function of carrying out the definitive conquest of these territories.

The origin of this fort dates back to 17 August 1899, when the 6th Cavalry Regiment arrived at the 28th parallel, and built a fort which they called General Necochea, and which was garrisoned by four squadrons. One day two soldiers of the 6th regiment working outside the fort were attacked by a tiger, but one of the soldiers killed it with a blow; then they cut off its head and took it to the fort, where they placed it on a stake at the entrance to the fort. Since then, when they referred to the aforementioned fort, they did so by saying: "el cabeza de tigre" or Fortín "Cabeza del Tigre", whose name still persists today to refer to the place.

This Regiment, which had been commanded by Martín Hernández, was replaced by Commander Juan José Rosetti; with him it continued its advance towards the centre of the Chaco, creating the forts Potrero, Avanzada, Pasaje, Totoralito and Encrucijada, located in our current area of Coronel Du Graty and others. By 1910 the garrison consisted of 30 soldiers and 30 mules to travel through the area, through open trails in the bush.

For this reason, when the settled population reached a certain importance, one of the first names proposed for this town was Fortín Encrucijada, located in the area known as El Ñandubay. This name did not prosper because it was replaced in 1942 by the name of Coronel Du Graty proposed by the French Railway Company and ratified by a Decree of the National Government.

=== Arrival of the Railway ===
In order to facilitate the commercialisation of timber, in 1927, the railway line was extended from the city of Villa Ángela by the forestry company "La Chaqueña". In order to continue with the exploitation of timber in the fields of Zuberbhüler, El Ñandubay and Campo Ugarte, a railway line was extended up to Km 23 in the place that today occupies this town, which passed near the old fort Encrucijada. The inauguration of this branch line from Villa Ángela to Ñandubay took place on 29 May 1927. There are photographic testimonies of the baptism of the branch line that was made with a glass of champagne by María Antonia Zuccarelli daughter of Andrés Zuccarelli, manager of La Chaqueña between 1922 and 1947 and with the presence of the authorities of the company.

It was a network of decauvilles extended by La Chaqueña to works owned by him and other private individuals, which reached an extension of 75 kilometres, with the tannin factory as a starting point, through which the Santa Fe Railway passed. In this way, the transport of wood was facilitated and a "beach" was formed with a winch for the loading of timber or logs. As a result of this development, a nucleus of settlers was formed, the social and economic transformation of the area was rapid and the commercial movement acquired a certain importance. Mr. Victor Luis Goycochea established himself with a general store, who later leased part of Mr. Zuberbuhler's land with the purpose of using it for agriculture. Later, with the development of cotton cultivation in the area, the local cotton growers sent the raw cotton for industrialisation to other provinces. But later, with the opening of ginneries in the 1930s, bales and seed began to be transported by rail. As a consequence of the decline of the tannin towns located on the Santa Fe railway line, hundreds of families from the mills in that area moved towards km 95 of the Charadai branch line and settled in the fields in the Villa Ángela area.

=== Migrant boom ===
In the 1920s there was a massive influx of foreigners. Between 1914 and 1947, between 1914 and 1947, there was a vertiginous growth in population as a result of the laying of railway lines, the possibility of access to public lands and the cultivation of cotton. The settlement of Hungarian immigrants was particularly significant.

In 1936, during the month of October, Mr. Carlos and Mr. César Ugarte arranged for the survey of the land they owned to be used for the town. The survey was carried out by the Agronomist Martín Julio Ledesma. At first the town was given the name of Fortín Encrucijada, in homage to the army fort that existed in the fields of the area, of which there are currently no traces. We can only find out what it was like from a drawing in the historical book of school No. 197, which was made thanks to the description of Ramón Moyano, an old inhabitant of the area who knew it.

=== Imposition of the present name ===
In 1942, the French company that operated the railways requested the designation of names for the turnouts and stations located in different places. The file No. 3944, Letter O, of 1942 belonging to the Ministry of Public Works of the Argentine Republic records this request, and as the railway had already reached the place Fortín Encrucijada, the imposition of a name is requested and it is identified as "detour of Km 23" southwest of Villa Ángela.

For this reason, the vice-president of the Nation, Dr. Ramón Castillo, issued the decree N° 112.231 dated 26 January 1942, by means of which the name Coronel Du Graty was officially given to this place.

This name was proposed by the Advisory Board to the Railway Directorate in recognition of the services rendered to the country by this important military man of foreign origin.
