= Catamarca People's Movement =

Provincial political party in Argentina

The Catamarca People's Movement (Spanish: Movimiento Popular Catamarqueño) was a provincial political party from the Argentine Province of Catamarca, founded in 1971 by gynecologist and obstetrician Ignacio Joaquín Avalos (1931–2006) who studied medicine in the national university of Córdoba and played soccer in his beloved club named Defensores del Norte. From his extensive knowledge of his province and its inhabitants gathered after many years of medical practice and soccer playing, he developed the need to do something for the people and awareness about the problems of the region, that led him to create this independent political party. He was elected to become a member of the low chamber of the Argentinian National Congress for the period 1985–1989, due to an alliance with the Radical Civic Union. He was candidate for vice governor of Catamarca in the elections of 1987.

It was member of the national Recrear electoral alliance led by Ricardo López Murphy.
