= Jorge Remes Lenicov =

Argentinian politician

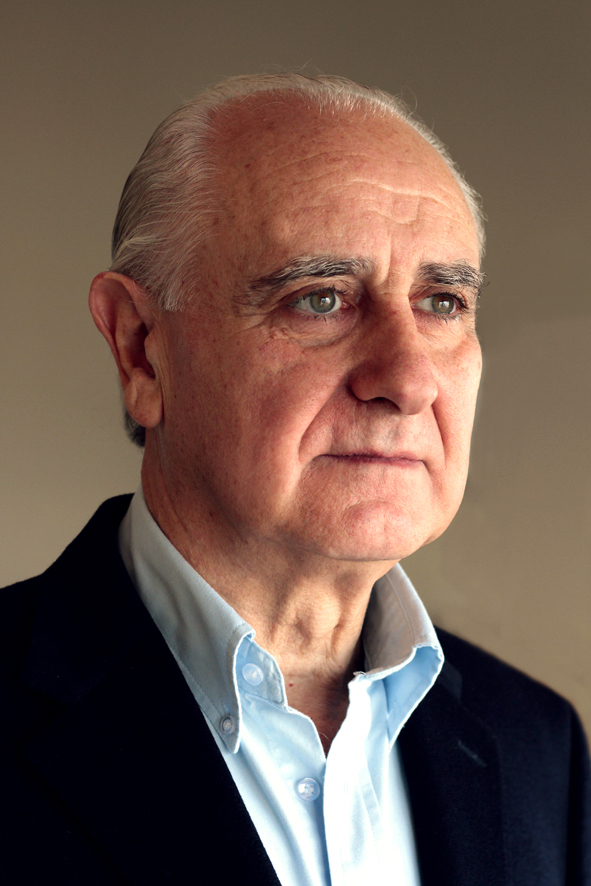

Minister of Economy of Argentina
- In office January 3, 2002 – April 27, 2002
- President: Eduardo Duhalde (Acting)
- Preceded by: Rodolfo Frigeri
- Succeeded by: Roberto Lavagna

Personal details
- Born: 1948 (age 77–78) La Plata, Argentina
- Party: Justicialist Party
- Education: National University of La Plata

Jorge Remes Lenicov (born 1948) is an Argentine peronist economist and politician who served as Minister of Economy and Production from January 3 till April 27, 2002 under Acting President Eduardo Duhalde.

His short term during the 1998–2002 Argentine great depression was unpopular. Remes Lenicov decided on an extreme freezing of the bank deposits, which was then coupled with the so-called pesificación ("peso-ification", a forced conversion of all U.S. dollar-denominated savings accounts into pesos at an arbitrary fixed exchange rate, considered by many constitutionalists to violate the fundamental right to private property), and a regulated devaluation. The fixed exchange rate system was abandoned soon afterwards, which was followed by a large depreciation and inflation.

Afterwards Remes Lenicov served as Argentine ambassador to the European Union till 2011.
