= Herminio Iglesias =

Argentine politician (1929–2007)

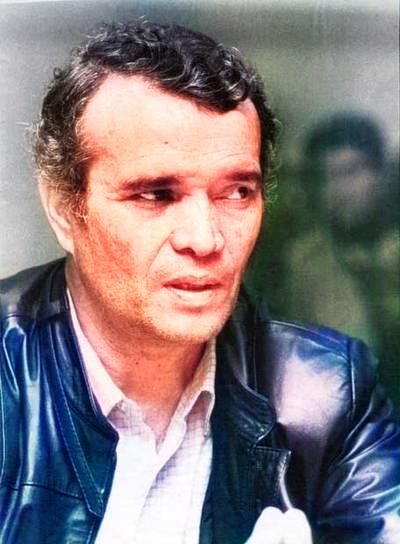

National Deputy
- In office 10 December 1985 – 10 December 1989
- Constituency: Buenos Aires

Mayor of Avellaneda
- In office 25 May 1973 – 24 March 1976
- President: Tomás Noel Piatis
- Preceded by: Jorge Fernández
- Succeeded by: Oscar Aguad

Personal details
- Born: 20 October 1929 Avellaneda, Argentina
- Died: 16 February 2007 (aged 77)
- Party: Justicialist Party

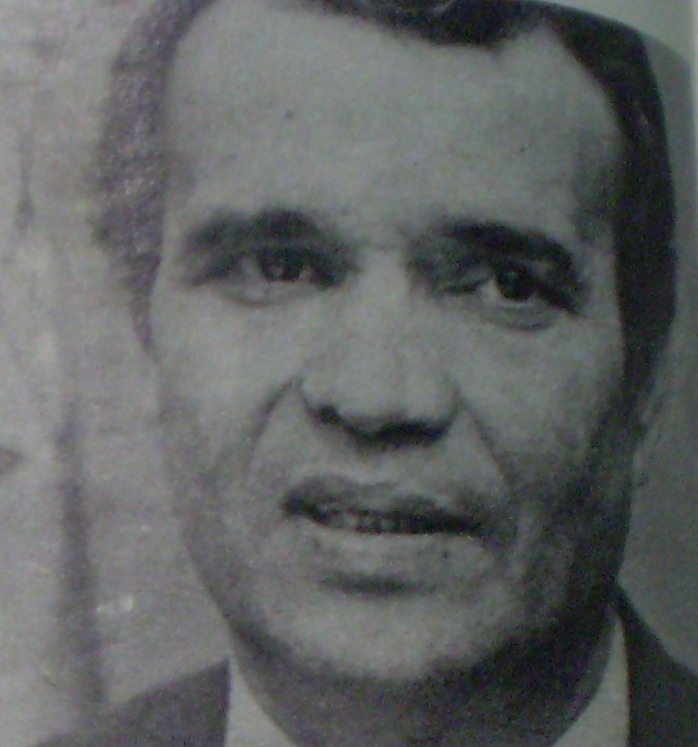
Herminio Iglesias

Herminio Iglesias (20 October 1929 – 16 February 2007) was an Argentine politician and trade unionist. A member of the Justicialist Party, he was intendente (mayor) of Avellaneda from 1973 to 1976, and later served as a National Deputy and councilman in Avellaneda. He is perhaps most remembered for his unsuccessful gubernatorial run in Buenos Aires Province in 1983.

== Youth ==
The son of Galician immigrants, at the age of 13, Iglesias began to work in a factory, where, at age 21, he was appointed as a union shop steward.

== Political career ==
Henceforward a supporter of the Peronist Party, Iglesias was elected as the Mayor of Avellaneda in the Province of Buenos Aires upon Juan Domingo Perón's 1973 return from exile and subsequent election to his final turn at the Argentine Presidency. Aligning himself with Perón's most right-wing adviser, José López Rega, during the internal strife that followed Perón's 1974 passing, he was dismissed from this post following the 1976 military coup headed by General Jorge Videla.

=== Cardboard coffin controversy ===
In 1983, Iglesias was the Peronist candidate for Governor of Buenos Aires Province. At a "victory rally" towards the end of the election campaign, his followers approached him with a cardboard coffin with the inscription "UCR" (representing their main opposition), which he set on fire. This episode was broadcast by national TV channels. For many observers, this act was perceived by public opinion as a recall of the country's recent violent past, and was decisive in the victory of the UCR in the general elections and in his own loss to UCR gubernatorial candidate Alejandro Armendáriz. After this incident, he significantly lost his political prestige while quemar el cajón became political jargon for insensitive faux pas.

== Legislative branch ==
Between 1985 and 1989, Iglesias occupied a seat in the Argentine Chamber of Deputies. In the 1990s, he was a Councillor in the Municipality of Avellaneda. He lived his final years largely in seclusion, partly because of his health problems.
