= Jorge Aguado =

Argentine politician (1925–2019)

Jorge Rubén Aguado (6 November 1925 – 12 July 2019) was an Argentine politician.

== Rural leadership ==
As a ruralist, he stood out in the presidency of the Confederation of Rural Associations of Buenos Aires and La Pampa (Carbap) between 1974 and 1978 and then as head of the Argentine Rural Confederations (CRA), between 1978 and 1981.

In ruralism he left a mark that lasted beyond his mandate. In a statement, Carbap recalled that Aguado "was a clear promoter of the development and training of the union leadership." And he stressed that he was a "defender of agricultural production as a pillar of the growth and development of our country." In 2007, when the entity was 75 years old, Aguado received the "Pilares de Carbap" award.

Rural leaders recall that Aguado was the driving force behind Carbap's refusal to subscribe to the price control policy set by José Ber Gelbard, Juan Perón's Minister of Economy, in 1974. "Principles are not negotiable", was the A phase repeated by Aguado and transmitted to the agricultural producers who were starting out in the business union activity.

== National Reorganization Process ==
From the Argentine Rural Confederations he was summoned to assume as Minister of Agriculture and Livestock by the de facto president Roberto Eduardo Viola. After a brief administration, Aguado served as Governor of Buenos Aires Province until December 1983 in the last section of the military government.

== Politics ==
As a political leader, Aguado was a National Deputy for the Union of the Democratic Center for the Buenos Aires Province between 1989 and 1993. From that space, he vigorously defended the principles of free trade and private initiative.

== Private sector ==
In private activity, in the 1990s, he held the vice-presidency of the Socma group, run by Francisco Macri. Among his responsibilities was the ownership of the Correo Argentino.

== After ==
Aguado died on 12 July 2019, in Buenos Aires at the age of 93. His remains were interred in the Pilar Memorial.
