= Enrique Urién =

Coordinates: 27°34′S 60°32′W

- Municipality and village
- Interactive map of Enrique Urién
- Country: Argentina
- Province: Chaco Province
- Time zone: UTC−3 (ART)

Enrique Urién is a village and municipality in Chaco Province in northern Argentina.
