= Eduardo Duhalde =

Interim President of Argentina from 2002 to 2003

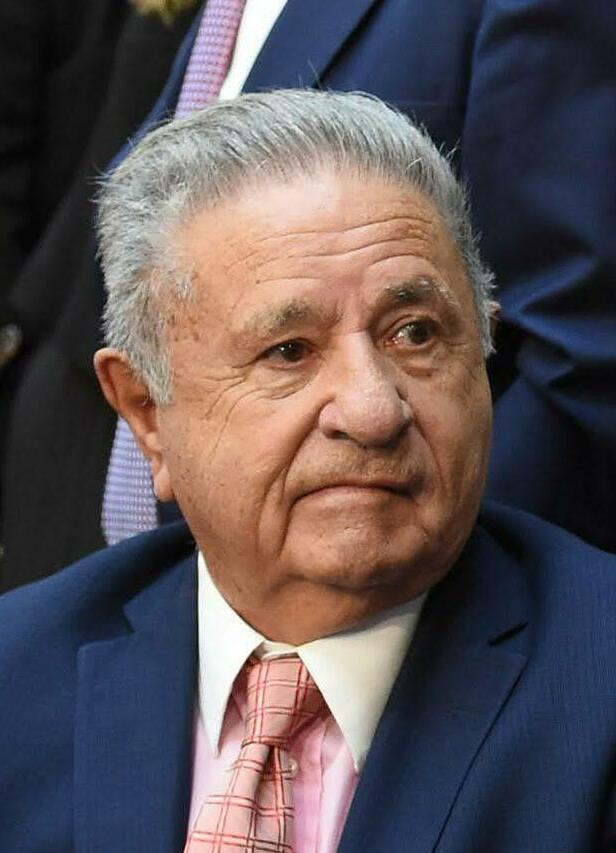
- Duhalde in 2023

53rd President of Argentina
- In office 2 January 2002 – 25 May 2003
- Vice President: Vacant
- Preceded by: Eduardo Camaño (a.i.)
- Succeeded by: Néstor Kirchner

30th Vice President of Argentina
- In office 8 July 1989 – 10 December 1991
- President: Carlos Menem
- Preceded by: Víctor Hipólito Martínez
- Succeeded by: Carlos Ruckauf (1995)

Governor of Buenos Aires
- In office 10 December 1991 – 10 December 1999
- Vice Governor: Rafael Romá
- Preceded by: Antonio Cafiero
- Succeeded by: Carlos Ruckauf

Mayor of Lomas de Zamora
- In office 11 December 1983 – 10 December 1987
- Preceded by: Military Junta
- Succeeded by: Hugo Toledo
- In office 8 August 1974 – 24 March 1976
- Preceded by: Pedro Pablo Turner
- Succeeded by: Military Junta

National Senator
- In office 11 December 2001 – 2 January 2002
- Constituency: Buenos Aires

Member of the Constitutional Convention
- In office 1 May 1994 – 22 August 1994

National Deputy
- In office 10 December 1987 – 6 July 1989
- Constituency: Buenos Aires

Personal details
- Born: Eduardo Alberto Duhalde; 5 October 1941 (age 85) Lomas de Zamora, Greater Buenos Aires, Argentina
- Party: Justicialist Party
- Spouse: Hilda Beatriz González
- Education: University of Buenos Aires
- Eduardo Duhalde's voice Recorded c. 2002-03

Eduardo Alberto Duhalde (Spanish pronunciation: [eˈðwaɾðo alˈβeɾto ˈðwalde]; born 5 October 1941) is a former politician from Argentina. A member of the Peronist party, Duhalde served as the President of Argentina from January 2002 to May 2003. In the 1990s, he also held the positions of vice president and governor of Buenos Aires.

Duhalde was elected to the local legislature and appointed intendente (mayor) in 1973. He was deposed during the 1976 Argentine coup d'état. After democracy returned, he was elected again in 1983. He was elected vice president of Argentina in 1989, under President Carlos Menem. Duhalde resigned as vice president and was elected governor of Buenos Aires Province in 1991, and re-elected in 1995.

He ran for president in 1999 and was defeated by Fernando de la Rúa, who ended up resigning during the December 2001 riots. After he resigned, Congress appointed the governor of San Luis Province Adolfo Rodríguez Saá as president. When Rodríguez Saá also resigned, Congress appointed Duhalde. During Duhalde’s presidency, a major currency devaluation and rising exchange rates contributed to a gradual economic recovery. He successfully supported the candidate Néstor Kirchner against Menem. Duhalde is largely retired from politics since his defeat in the 2011 presidential elections.

== Early life and career ==
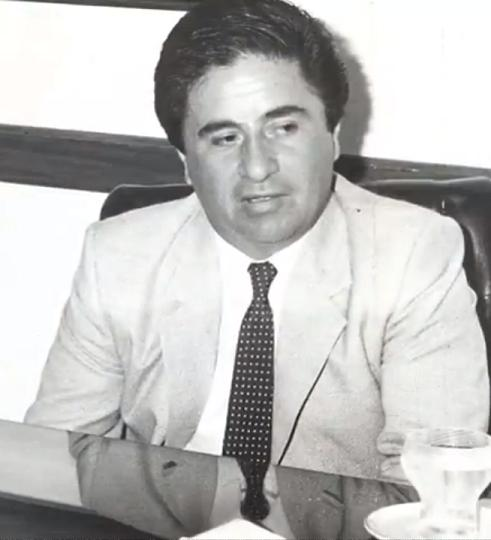
Eduardo Duhalde in 1974

Eduardo Alberto Duhalde was born in Lomas de Zamora, in the Greater Buenos Aires region. He graduated as a lawyer in 1970. He was elected to the city legislature the next year. He joined the Justicialist Party (PJ), and soon became leader of the party's local branch. Duhalde was appointed mayor in 1973 after the legislature removed two predecessors during a political reorganization by President Isabel Perón. He was removed from office during the 1976 Argentine coup d’état and later worked as a real estate broker.

In 1983, Eduardo Duhalde was elected mayor of Lomas de Zamora. The Justicialist Party (PJ) nominated him as a centrist compromise. He narrowly defeated UCR candidate Horacio Devoy by 700 votes. Both parties won eleven seats in the local legislature. Duhalde reported that a colonel sought his support for a possible coup against the newly elected president Raúl Alfonsín. Duhalde refused and reported directly to Alfonsín himself. He was elected national deputy in 1987, and became vice president of the Argentine Chamber of Deputies. During his time in office he established a commission to fight drug addiction.

== Vice presidency and governorship ==
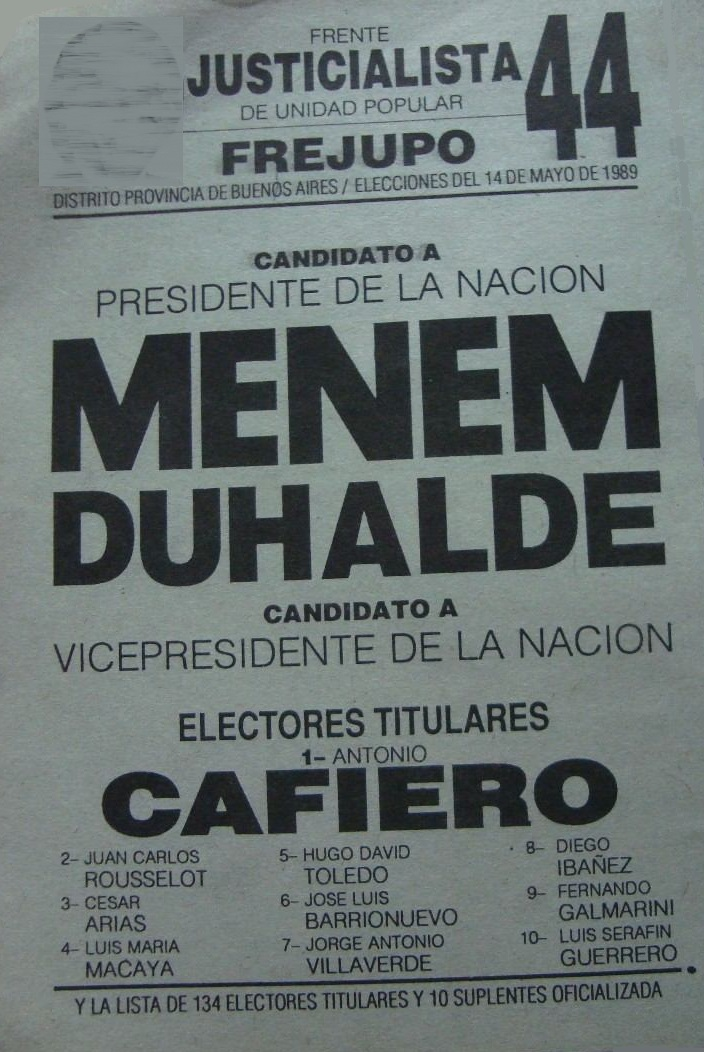
Ballot of the Justicialist Party for the 1989 presidential elections

In 1989, the PJ held primary elections for the presidential contest between Carlos Menem (governor of La Rioja) and Antonio Cafiero (governor of the Buenos Aires Province). Carlos Menem won the election with Eduardo Duhalde as his running mate, securing victory in the general election.

Menem suggested that Duhalde run for governor of Buenos Aires Province. Duhalde agreed, on the condition that the province receive significant budget support. The proposal was backed in Congress by Raúl Alfonsín, beginning a lasting alliance between the two leaders. Duhalde won the election, ending the political influence of Cafiero.

Duhalde planned to run for president in 1995, but Menem pushed through a 1994 constitutional amendment allowing himself to seek re-election. After failing to defeat Menem in the primaries, Duhalde sought a similar amendment to the Buenos Aires provincial constitution to allow his own re-election as governor. The Justicialist Party lacked a majority in the constituent assembly, and the UCR, Broad Front, and MODIN formed a “triple alliance” to block the change. MODIN later switched sides, supporting the amendment on the condition that it be approved by a provincial referendum. The referendum approved the constitutional change, allowing Duhalde to seek re-election. He went on to win the general election. Menem was also re-elected in the 1995 general elections.

After the new constitution limited presidents to one re-election, the PJ began debating its future leadership. Shortly after the 1995 elections, Duhalde announced his intention to run for president in 1999, sparking a strong rivalry with Menem. In response, Menem launched a “Menem ’99” advertising campaign, despite being ineligible for another term, to maintain political influence.

Menem backed Tucumán governor Palito Ortega as a potential presidential candidate, increasing party tensions. Duhalde’s image suffered due to several scandals, including national issues like illegal arms sales and provincial ones such as police corruption and the murder of journalist José Luis Cabezas. The Justicialist Party lost the 1997 midterm elections, and Menem relaunched his “Menem ’99” campaign, which the Supreme Court later declared unconstitutional. Ortega ran as Duhalde’s vice-presidential candidate in 1999, but they lost to Fernando de la Rúa.

De la Rúa’s government faced a severe economic crisis and the 2001 riots, leading to his resignation two years into his term. He believed Duhalde had orchestrated a coup against him. However, his chief of staff, Rodolfo Terragno, blamed the crisis on the continued peso-dollar parity and its economic costs. In interviews for Doce noches, Duhalde and other Peronists stated they had no interest in ousting De la Rúa, believing his unpopularity would ensure a Justicialist victory in the 2003 presidential election.

== Presidency (2002-2003) ==
=== Appointment ===
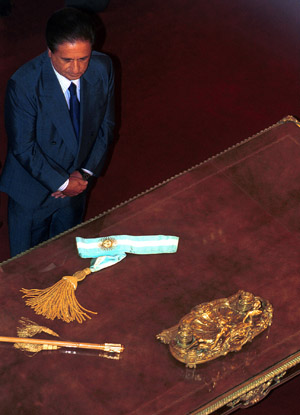
Duhalde takes the oath of office as president of Argentina

Fernando de la Rúa resigned as president during the December 2001 riots amid a deep economic crisis. With the vice presidency already vacant, Congress was tasked with appointing a new president. A bloc of Peronist governors from smaller provinces, known as the “Federal Front,” secured enough votes to appoint Adolfo Rodríguez Saá, governor of San Luis Province. However, his early decisions in office triggered further unrest, and he lacked support from the broader Justicialist Party. A meeting he called with provincial governors drew little attendance, and he resigned after one week in office. Rodríguez Saá later accused Eduardo Duhalde and Córdoba governor José Manuel de la Sota of plotting against him.

Congress met again to select a new president. With the Federal Front weakened, governors from more populous provinces gained influence. The main candidates were Duhalde, De la Sota, and Buenos Aires governor Carlos Ruckauf. Former president Carlos Menem sought to block Duhalde’s appointment and proposed Misiones governor Ramón Puerta, who declined. Eduardo Camaño briefly served as acting president.

Duhalde gained support from key political figures, including Raúl Alfonsín, who directed Radical legislators to vote for him and offered members of his party for cabinet positions. Duhalde also received votes from legislators aligned with Menem. With this backing, Congress appointed Duhalde president on 2 January 2002, granting him a full term to complete De la Rúa’s mandate rather than calling early elections.

=== Economic policy ===
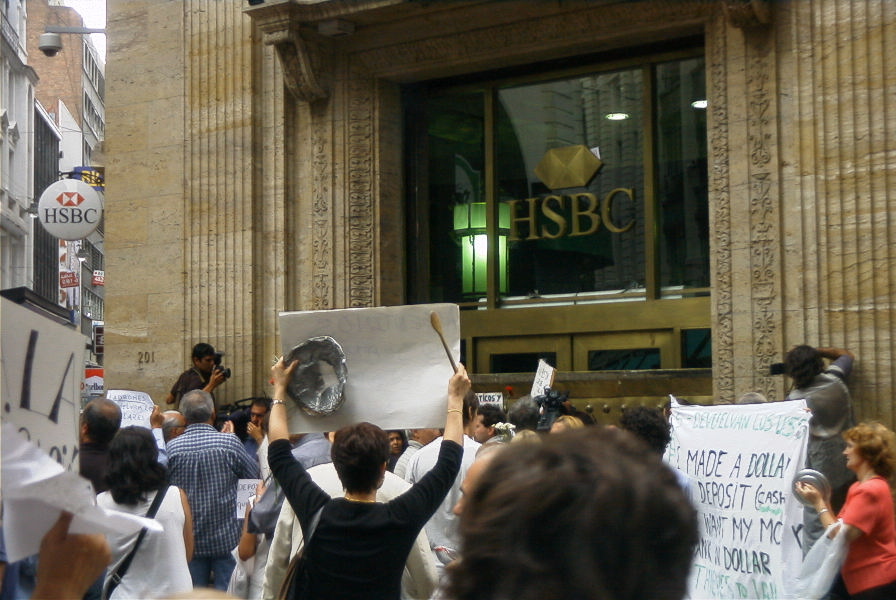
Depositors protest in February 2002 against the corralito, which forbade them from withdrawing money from their bank accounts. The measure was lifted in December

Duhalde, Alfonsín, their parties, the unions and the Church all agreed to promote policies to increase the industrial growth of the country. For this purpose, Duhalde created the ministry of production, with functions that used to belong to the ministries of economy and foreign relations. The new minister was José Ignacio de Mendiguren, head of the Argentine Industrial Union. Alfonsín negotiated with him, on Duhalde's behalf, while Congress was still voting for the new president. Duhalde announced at his inauguration that he would repeal the convertibility plan, considered the main cause of the economic crisis. Although Menem proposed a full dollarization of the Argentine economy, Duhalde preferred to instead stick to the peso and order a devaluation. Although it was initially expected to make a 40% devaluation, the exchange rate of 1 peso to 1 dollar jumped to 3 pesos to 1 dollar, a 200% devaluation. The higher dollar price allowed for more lucrative exports, increased economic activity and a growth in the employment rates, but at the cost of a higher cost of living.

The financial operations made in dollars were subject to a strong currency substitution to pesos, the "pesification". There were disputes over the exchange rate of such substitution, as the current price of the dollar in the open market would force most firms and individual debtor to bankruptcy. The initial policy was to make 1 to 1 substitutions to the operations below 100,000 dollars. Another conflict was the corralito, imposed by De la Rúa, which attempted to stop the bank run by forbidding the withdrawal of money from bank accounts. Duhalde promised in his oath of office speech that "Those who deposited dollars [would] receive dollars". The minister of economy Jorge Remes Lenicov pointed out that that would be impossible, as the amount of dollars required was higher than even the foreign-exchange reserves of the Central Bank. Duhalde acknowledged two weeks later that he was mistaken. The bank accounts in dollars would be "pesified" at a 1.4 exchange rate, and the state financed the banks for the different rates with other operations. The taxes of public services were "pesified" and fixed at their current values. Most industries benefited from the "pesification" and the devaluation, as they could now export at higher prices, and the economy started to improve. The jump in the international price of soybean in July 2002 also proved highly beneficial. The devaluation also increased the price of imported products, which allowed import substitution industrialization. As the local prices became cheap in dollars, international tourism to the country was increased. The national state absorbed the debts of the provinces and the bonds used as alternative currency, on the condition that they transferred the power to issue bonds.

Jorge Remes Lenicov resigned in April, alongside ministers De Mendiguren and Capitanich. Peronist governors, legislators, and union leaders met at the Quinta de Olivos, amid rumors that Duhalde would appoint the populist Daniel Carbonetto as minister of economy. They gave their full support to the president and the economic policies instrumented so far. As a result, Duhalde appointed the conservative Roberto Lavagna. Lavagna was the Argentine ambassador to the European Union, and switched offices with Remes Lenicov. He was suggested by Governor Carlos Ruckauf and supported by Alfonsín. He stabilised prices and the exchange rate with tight fiscal and monetary policies, and prevented the crisis from growing into a hyperinflation. The recovery also benefited from the idle capacity of the economy.

=== Domestic policy ===
On the political level, Duhalde's presidency was strongly influenced by his feud with Menem. Menem wanted to run for a new term as president in the 2003 election, and Duhalde wanted to prevent it. To this purpose, he sought other candidates that may have defeated him. Some of these potential candidates were Carlos Reutemann, José Manuel de la Sota, Mauricio Macri, Adolfo Rodríguez Saá, Felipe Solá and Roberto Lavagna, but none of those negotiations bore fruit. The scandal over the death of the piqueteros Maximiliano Kosteki and Darío Santillán in the Avellaneda massacre forced Duhalde to rush the elections by six months. As a result, he chose Néstor Kirchner, governor of Santa Cruz Province, despite his reservations. Kirchner was fifth in the presidential polls, and was mostly unknown by the public. Duhalde speculated that, although Menem had a large number of willing voters to begin with, he was also very unpopular. Thus, Menem might have won the elections but if the results called for a ballotage, most of the population would rally under any candidate with a chance to defeat him.

To harm Menem's chances even further, the 2003 election used a variant of the Ley de Lemas for a single time. This way, the Peronists Menem, Kirchner and Rodríguez Saá did not run for primary elections, but faced each other directly in the open election. None of the three candidates ran on the Justicialist Party ticket, but for special parties created for the occasion: Menem for the "Front for Loyalty", Kirchner for the "Front for Victory" and Rodríguez Saá (who run for president anyway, but as a critic of Duhalde) for the "Front of the National and Popular Movement". It was also announced that Lavagna would stay as minister of Economy during a presidency of Kirchner, to capitalize the support for the ongoing economic policies. Menem defeated Kirchner in the elections, benefited by the lack of popular candidates, but gave up running for a ballotage, fearing that he would lose this special election.

=== Foreign policy ===
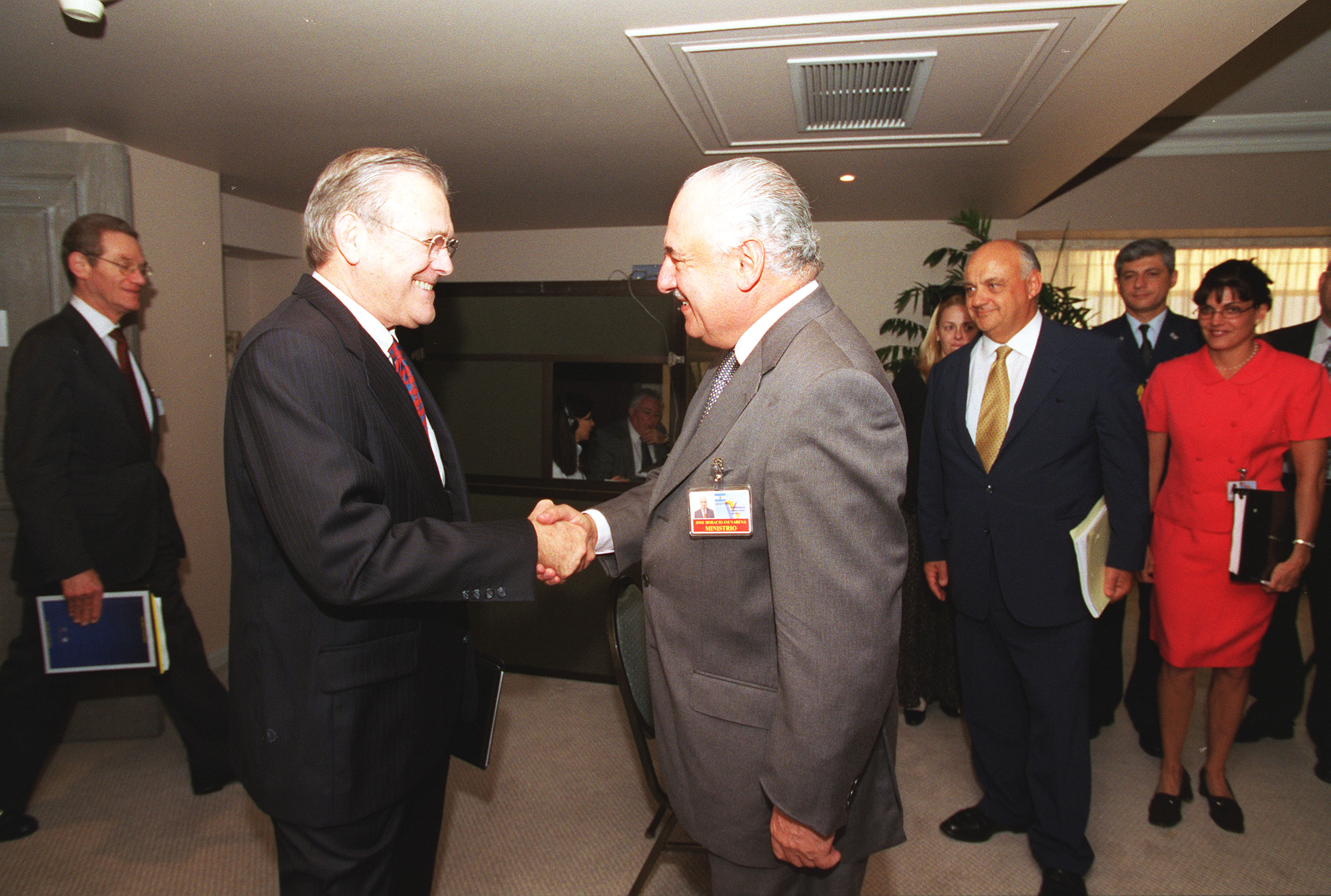
US secretary of defense Donald Rumsfeld and Argentine minister of defense Horacio Jaunarena

Duhalde was appointed president in the aftermath of the September 11 attacks, when the foreign policy of the United States was strictly focused on the war on terror. Initially, the Argentine society was divided on how to manage the bilateral relations with the US. One group wanted to keep the close relations of the previous decade, as Argentina might need foreign help to deal with the crisis. The other group preferred to maintain more distant relations. Duhalde sought to strike a balance between both options, and eventually leaned towards the second when the US refused to help Argentina. Duhalde declared in 2026 that the United States ambassador assured him through the Embassy's chief officer that they were preparing a coup d'état against him in 2002.

Argentina voted in the United Nations condemning the human rights violations in Cuba, but refused to send military forces to Afghanistan and Iraq. Still, Duhalde proposed to send peacekeeping troops, and strongly criticized the regime of Saddam Hussein and international terrorism. Duhalde increased his criticism of the United States during the final years of his government, and changed the vote in relation to Cuba to an abstention. Those changes were motivated by the upcoming 2003 elections. Menem, who was running for a third term as president, supported the vote condemning Cuba and the military aid to the United States.

The devaluation caused a diplomatic conflict with Spain, as Duhalde did not allow the Spanish service providers to raise taxes. So far, they received their income according to the dollar exchange rate, and intended to raise taxes to compensate their losses. The Argentine government considered that the effects of the crisis were already grave enough for the people, and further price increases would only worsen the situation. José María Aznar, prime minister of Spain, talked with Duhalde on behalf of the Spanish firms. The taxes were not raised, but Aznar stayed on good terms with Duhalde, and ratified the good relations with the country regardless of the victor of the 2003 elections.

== Later years ==
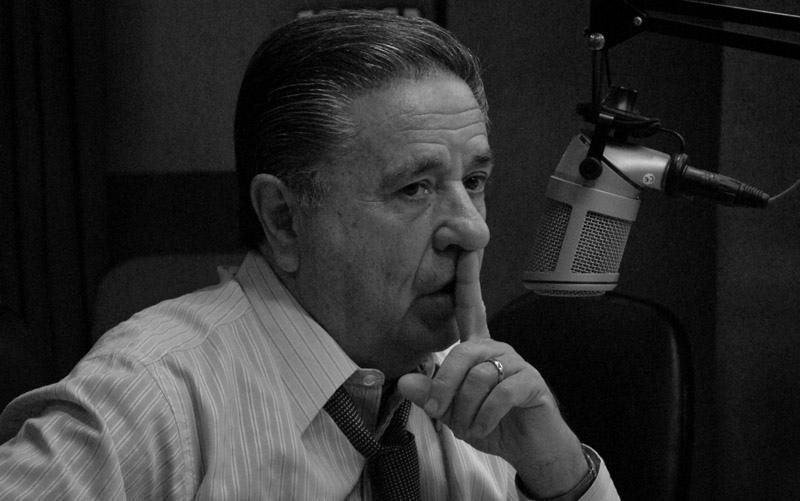
Duhalde during the 2011 campaign

Duhalde was succeeded by Néstor Kirchner on 25 May 2003. Kirchner soon distanced himself from Duhalde, and removed all the people close to Duhalde from the government to reduce his political influence. Kirchner also sought supporters from all the social and political spectra to counter the influence of Duhalde within the party. However, both men delayed an open dispute and stuck together during the 2003 legislative elections, held in October. The dispute continued in the 2005 midterm elections. Without consensus in the PJ for a single candidate for senator of the Buenos Aires province, both leaders had their respective wives run for the office: Hilda González de Duhalde for the PJ, and Cristina Fernández de Kirchner for the Front for Victory, which was kept by the Kirchners. Cristina Kirchner won those elections.

On 23 December 2009, Duhalde announced his intention to run for the presidency in the 2011 presidential elections. Néstor Kirchner had been succeeded by Cristina Kirchner in the presidency, staying as a highly influential figure, and it was still unclear which of the Kirchners would run in 2011. Many mayors of the Buenos Aires province were unsure whether to support Duhalde or the Kirchners. Duhalde organized the Federal Peronism faction, with members of the PJ opposing the Kirchners. Néstor Kirchner died in October 2010; the subsequent state funeral halted the campaign for a few months.

The Federal Peronism organized primary elections for the 2011 presidential elections between Duhalde and governor Alberto Rodríguez Saá, which would be held before the mandatory primary elections. Governors Felipe Solá and Mario Das Neves withdrew their candidacies. Duhalde withdrew his candidacy near the end of the primary elections. As the sole candidate, Rodríguez Saá ran for Federal Peronism, which allied with other provincial parties into the Federal Commitment coalition. Duhalde ran for president as well, on the Unión Popular ticket. He received nearly 6% of the vote in the main elections, a large difference from the number of votes cast for the main candidates, and Hilda Duhalde was not reelected as senator. In 2017 he announced that he intends to run for president of the PJ.

== Personal life ==
Duhalde worked as a pool lifeguard before embarking on his political career. He met Hilda González at the pool in 1970 and they married the following year. They have five sons and seven grandsons. They live in a country house in San Vicente, Buenos Aires, named "Don Tomás" after Duhalde's father. The house had been donated for the creation of a foster care center which was never built, and was reclaimed by Duhalde. The rebuilt site includes a large grove, a pool, a tennis field, and an artificial lake.

Duhalde has largely retired from politics since his defeat in the 2011 elections. He sought to make amends with Menem for their past political rivalry, and met him during the 2013 papal inauguration of Pope Francis. They had a private meeting at Menem's house, and Menem reported that they were on peaceful terms. They had previously met in similar circumstances in 2005, during the funeral of Pope John Paul II.

== Documentary ==
- A diplomatic incident with Uruguay during Duhalde's presidency is portrayed at Jorge Batlle: entre el cielo y el infierno, a 2024 documentary directed by Federico Lemos.

== Bibliography ==
- Domínguez, Jorge (2010). Contemporary U.S.-Latin American Relations. Routledge. ISBN 9781136962608.
- Mendelevich, Pablo (2010). El Final. Buenos Aires: Ediciones B. ISBN 978-987-627-166-0.
- Fraga, Rosendo (2010). Fin de ciclo: ascenso, apogeo y declinación del poder kirchnerista (in Spanish). Buenos Aires: Ediciones B. ISBN 978-987-627-167-7.
- Reato, Ceferino (2015). Doce noches [Twelve nights] (in Spanish). Argentina: Sudamericana. ISBN 978-950-07-5203-9.
- Romero, Luis Alberto (2013) [1994]. A History of Argentina in the Twentieth Century. United States: The Pennsylvania University Press. ISBN 978-0-271-06228-0.

Political offices
Preceded by Víctor Hipólito Martínez	Vice President of Argentina; 1989–1991	Succeeded by Carlos Ruckauf
Preceded by Antonio Cafiero	Governor of the Buenos Aires Province; 1991–1999	Succeeded by Carlos Ruckauf
Preceded by Adolfo Rodríguez Saá interim	President of Argentina interim 2002–2003	Succeeded by Néstor Kirchner
