= Ítalo Argentino Luder =

Argentine politician (1916-2008)

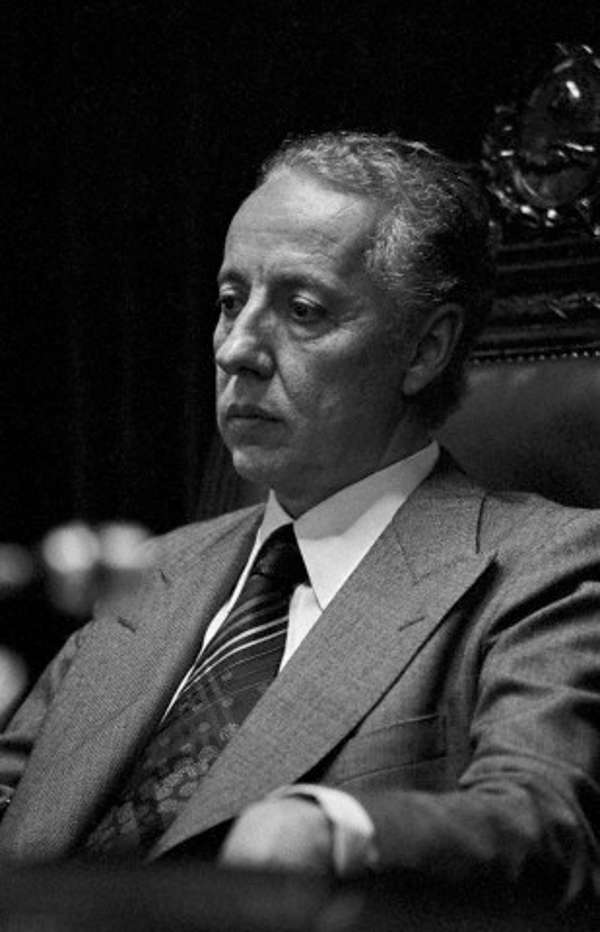

Minister of Defense
- In office 8 July 1989 – 26 January 1990
- President: Carlos Menem
- Preceded by: Horacio Jaunarena
- Succeeded by: Humberto Romero

Provisional President of the Senate
- In office 1 July 1974 – 24 March 1976
- Preceded by: José Antonio Allende
- Succeeded by: Office Vacant; Edison Otero next to hold office in 1983

National Senator
- In office 25 May 1973 – 1 July 1974
- Constituency: Buenos Aires

Personal details
- Born: December 31, 1916 Rafaela, Santa Fe Province, Argentina
- Died: May 25, 2008 (aged 91) Buenos Aires, Argentina
- Party: Justicialist Party
- Spouse: Isolda Luisa Fabris
- Education: National University of the Littoral
- Profession: Lawyer

Ítalo Argentino Luder (31 December 1916 – 25 May 2008) was an Argentine Justicialist Party politician. As provisional president of the Argentine Senate, Luder served as the acting President of Argentina from 13 September 1975 until 16 October 1975, deputizing for Isabel Perón. Luder was also the Justicialist Party's 1983 presidential candidate, a National Deputy, one of Carlos Menem's defense ministers, and Argentina's ambassador to France.

== Background and earlier life ==
Luder was born in Rafaela, Santa Fe Province. He enrolled at his province's National University of the Littoral, where he received a juris doctor in 1938. Luder was first elected to a seat in the Constitutional Convention of 1948, which drafted president Juan Perón's 1949 replacement of the 1853 Constitution of Argentina. Following Perón's 1955 overthrow, however, the original document was reinstated, and the exiled Perón entrusted Luder with his legal defense in absentia vis-á-vis extensive corruption charges.

Luder was elected to the Argentine Senate as a Peronist for Santa Fe Province in 1973. Upon the resignation of Senate President Alejandro Díaz Bialet in July, Luder was elected to that post. Following President Juan Perón's 1974 death, Isabel Perón became head of state, though by September 1975, mounting instability led her to announce a month's sick leave.

== Acting President of Argentina ==
Lacking a Vice President, the post of acting President of Argentina fell to Luder, whose brief tenure would later be remembered chiefly for his signing of Decrees 2770-2772, which created a "Council for Internal Security", in response to Operation Primicia, a guerrilla attack carried out by Montoneros on a military barracks at Formosa Province. The measure, combined with prior ones, was successful in quelling an insurgent campaign led by the leftist ERP in Tucumán Province, though it in practice extended a state of siege nationwide.

== Later Peronist leadership and other roles ==
Luder was nominated candidate for president for the Justicialist Party during the 1983 elections that resulted in the return of democracy following nearly eight years of dictatorship. The strong support of his candidacy by the CGT labor union could not compensate, however, for the Peronists' late start (the nomination was secured less than two months before election day), the rival UCR nominee Raúl Alfonsín's skillful campaign, or voters' bitter memories of Isabel Perón's chaotic tenure, among other problems. Luder was defeated on election night by around 12%.

He was appointed Defense Secretary by newly elected President Carlos Menem in 1989, but a cabinet shake-up on the heels of a crisis at the end of the year led to his replacement, whereby Luder was named Ambassador to France. Ítalo Luder died from complications of Alzheimer's disease at the age of 91, on May 25, 2008, in Buenos Aires.
