= Villa Ángela =

- City
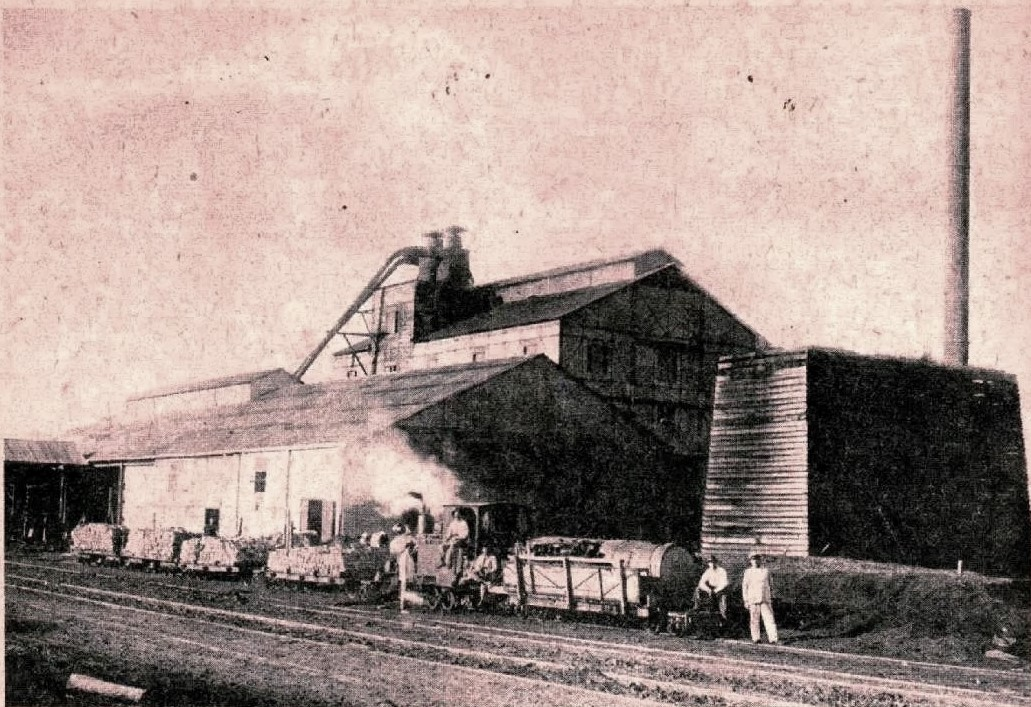
- Quebracho extract factory La Chaqueña S.A. in Villa Ángela

- Location of Villa Ángela in Argentina
- Coordinates: 27°35′S 60°43′W
- Country: Argentina
- Province: Chaco
- Department: Mayor L. J. Fontana
- Founded: 1910
- Elevation: 70 m (230 ft)

Population (2010 census)
  - Total: 41,403
- Time zone: UTC−3 (ART)
- CPA base: H3540
- Dialing code: +54 3735
- Climate: Cwa
- Website: Official website

Villa Ángela is a city in the province of Chaco, Argentina, 186 km west of the provincial capital Resistencia. It is on the Gran Chaco, a lowland region of the Río de la Plata basin. It has 43,511 inhabitants as per the 2001 census [INDEC], making it the third largest in the province.

== History ==
In 1908, Carlos Gruneisen y Julio Ulises Martin (Swiss, born 31 July 1862, creator of the Yerbatera Martin, in Rosario), acquired the land that would become the jurisdiction of Villa Angela. He had the tannin factory, La Chaqueña S.A., built and the adjacent areas immediately began to be settled.

Punta de rieles and km 95 were the names it first received when it was no more than a hamlet. In 1910, as a tribute to the centennial of the May Revolution and 24 May, they decided to found a village and give it the name Villa Ángela. It was named after Ángela Joostens, the wife of Julio Ulises Martin, one of its two founders.

The city boasts one of the major Carnavals of the country. This popular festival extends from mid-January to mid-February since 1950.

== Weather ==
The city's weather is subtropical, dry in winter and very wet and hot in the summer.

- Record high: 46 °C
- Record low: -6 °C
- Average annual precipitation: 1,100 mm

Climate data for Villa Ángela (1941–1950)
Month	Jan	Feb	Mar	Apr	May	Jun	Jul	Aug	Sep	Oct	Nov	Dec	Year
Record high °C (°F)	43.8 (110.8)	44.4 (111.9)	42.3 (108.1)	36.9 (98.4)	34.1 (93.4)	33.4 (92.1)	33.4 (92.1)	40.9 (105.6)	42.6 (108.7)	44.4 (111.9)	44.1 (111.4)	44.2 (111.6)	44.4 (111.9)
Mean daily maximum °C (°F)	36.3 (97.3)	35.1 (95.2)	31.5 (88.7)	28.3 (82.9)	24.3 (75.7)	21.6 (70.9)	21.4 (70.5)	25.7 (78.3)	28.1 (82.6)	30.6 (87.1)	32.7 (90.9)	35.6 (96.1)	29.3 (84.7)
Daily mean °C (°F)	27.2 (81.0)	26.4 (79.5)	23.3 (73.9)	20.2 (68.4)	17.4 (63.3)	14.5 (58.1)	13.6 (56.5)	16.6 (61.9)	19.2 (66.6)	22.0 (71.6)	24.3 (75.7)	26.9 (80.4)	21.0 (69.8)
Mean daily minimum °C (°F)	19.9 (67.8)	19.8 (67.6)	17.6 (63.7)	14.7 (58.5)	11.6 (52.9)	9.1 (48.4)	7.7 (45.9)	9.2 (48.6)	12.4 (54.3)	14.3 (57.7)	16.5 (61.7)	18.5 (65.3)	14.3 (57.7)
Record low °C (°F)	8.8 (47.8)	9.0 (48.2)	7.0 (44.6)	2.6 (36.7)	−1.6 (29.1)	−4.0 (24.8)	−5.6 (21.9)	−4.1 (24.6)	−0.3 (31.5)	1.1 (34.0)	8.4 (47.1)	8.9 (48.0)	−5.6 (21.9)
Average precipitation mm (inches)	116 (4.6)	143 (5.6)	126 (5.0)	99 (3.9)	44 (1.7)	33 (1.3)	32 (1.3)	15 (0.6)	48 (1.9)	73 (2.9)	98 (3.9)	75 (3.0)	902 (35.5)
Source: Sistema de Clasificación Bioclimática Mundial
