= Emilio Basavilbaso =

Argentine economist

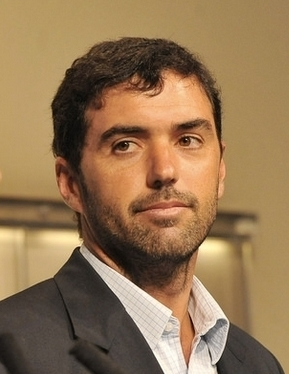

Director Ejecutivo de la Administración Nacional de la Seguridad Social (National Social Security Administration, ANSES)
- In office 10 December 2015 – 10 December 2019
- President: Mauricio Macri
- Preceded by: Diego Bossio
- Succeeded by: Alejandro Vanoli

Personal details
- Born: September 11, 1976 (age 49) Buenos Aires, Argentina
- Party: Republican Proposal
- Education: Universidad Torcuato Di Tella (Torcuato Di Tella University); Universidad Nebrija (University of Nebrija); Instituto Tecnológico de Buenos Aires (Buenos Aires Institute of Technology, ITBA)

Emilio Basavilbaso (born 11 September 1976) is an Argentine economist and politician. He served as Executive Director of the Administración Nacional de la Seguridad Social (National Social Security Administration, ANSES) from 2015 to 2019. Since 2024 he has worked at Globant as a vice president in North America, focused on artificial intelligence in finance.

== Education ==
Basavilbaso completed his primary and secondary education at Colegio Cardenal Newman (Cardinal Newman College) in Buenos Aires, graduating in 1994. He earned a bachelor's degree in Business Economics with a minor in History and Politics from the Universidad Torcuato Di Tella (Torcuato Di Tella University) in 1999. With a scholarship from Fundación Carolina (Carolina Foundation), he completed an MBA focused on technology companies at the Universidad Nebrija (University of Nebrija) in Madrid, where he received an honor medal in 2004. He also obtained a leadership diploma from the Instituto Tecnológico de Buenos Aires (Buenos Aires Institute of Technology, ITBA).

== Professional activity ==
=== Private sector ===
Between 1999 and 2008 he worked at Telefónica in regional roles, alternating residencies in Brazil, Spain, Chile, Colombia and Peru. From 2022 to 2024 he served as Chief Operating Officer of Grupo Clarín (Clarín Group). In 2024 he joined Globant as Vice President for North America, focusing on applications of artificial intelligence in financial services.

=== Public service ===
==== Gobierno de la Ciudad Autónoma de Buenos Aires (Government of the Autonomous City of Buenos Aires) ====
He served as Director General de Planificación Estratégica (General Directorate of Strategic Planning), contributing to the Annual Government Plans for 2009 and 2010. In January 2010 he was appointed Subsecretario de Modernización de la Gestión Pública (Undersecretary for Modernization of Public Management).

==== Instituto de Vivienda de la Ciudad (City Housing Institute) ====
In 2014 he was appointed President of the Instituto de Vivienda de la Ciudad (IVC, City Housing Institute). During his tenure he promoted the Primera Casa BA (First Home BA) program. He also advanced an enhancement plan for urban complexes, including new housing works and relocation of families in environmental emergency areas, and launched the Mi Propiedad (My Property) program to formalize title deeds.

=== ANSES ===
On 10 December 2015 Basavilbaso took office as Executive Director of the Administración Nacional de la Seguridad Social (National Social Security Administration). In 2016 the Ley 27.260 – Reparación Histórica para Jubilados y Pensionados (Historical Reparation Law for Retirees and Pensioners) was enacted, updating benefits for retirees and pensioners with legal claims against the State for lack of benefit indexation. That year, Decree DNU 593/2016 modified the Régimen de Asignaciones Familiares (Family Allowances Regime), incorporating monotributistas (small taxpayers) and expanding compatibility rules with certain social programs.

ANSES and the Ministerio de Desarrollo Social (Ministry of Social Development) implemented the Protección de Niños y Jóvenes (Child and Youth Protection) project with financing from the World Bank, within a larger lending program approved in 2016.

Under his administration, Créditos Argenta (Argenta loans) were expanded to beneficiaries of the Pensión Universal para el Adulto Mayor (Universal Pension for the Elderly), to non-contributory pension holders, and to parents receiving the Asignación Universal por Hijo (Universal Child Allowance, AUH) and the Asignación Familiar (Family Allowance). Between December 2015 and May 2017, overall coverage of family and universal allowances rose by approximately 25%, and by 2018 the system covered about 9.1 million children through Asignaciones Familiares and the AUH.

In 2017, ANSES and partner institutions published Análisis y propuestas de mejoras para ampliar la Asignación Universal por Hijo (Analysis and Proposals to Expand the AUH), a joint research effort by ANSES, the Ministerio de Desarrollo Social (Ministry of Social Development), UNICEF, the Facultad de Ciencias Económicas de la Universidad de Buenos Aires (Faculty of Economic Sciences, University of Buenos Aires), CEDLAS of the Universidad Nacional de La Plata (National University of La Plata) and the CNCPS. In 2018 the Libreta de la Asignación Universal (AUH booklet) could be submitted online through a new virtual process. That year, with UNICEF Argentina and other agencies, ANSES co-organized the international seminar Asignación Universal por Hijo, presente y futuro del derecho en la niñez (Universal Child Allowance: Present and Future of Children's Rights).

In 2018 he chaired the Permanent Committee of the Conferencia Interamericana de Seguridad Social (Inter-American Conference on Social Security, CISS), based in Mexico, and between 2018 and 2019 he served as president of the Organización Iberoamericana de Seguridad Social (Ibero-American Social Security Organization, OISS), headquartered in Madrid.

== Later activities ==
He has worked as a Senior International Consultant for the World Bank, authoring and co-authoring studies on Argentina’s pension system and social insurance. In 2021 he spoke at the Asociación Cristiana de Dirigentes de Empresa (Christian Association of Business Leaders, ACDE) and began teaching at the Universidad Austral (Austral University) as an associate professor.

Since 2024 he has served as a vice president at Globant, North America, in roles related to artificial intelligence and finance.

== Publications ==
Basavilbaso, Emilio; Demarco, Gustavo C.; Brodersohn, Ernesto; Abels, Miglena; Joubert, Clément (2023). "Social Insurance among Informal Workers in South Asia" (PDF). Hidden Potential: Rethinking Informality in South Asia. Washington, D.C.: World Bank. pp. 249–318.

Basavilbaso, Emilio (2022). La batalla por la inversión social en la Argentina (in Spanish). Buenos Aires: Mastergraf. ISBN 978-987-86390-7-9.

Basavilbaso, Emilio; Apella, Ignacio Raúl (2021). "La Relación Nación–Provincias en el Financiamiento del Sistema Previsional Argentino" (PDF) (in Spanish). Washington, D.C.: World Bank Group.

== See also ==
Administración Nacional de la Seguridad Social (National Social Security Administration)

Asignación Universal por Hijo (Universal Child Allowance)

Conferencia Interamericana de Seguridad Social (Inter-American Conference on Social Security)

Organización Iberoamericana de Seguridad Social (Ibero-American Social Security Organization)
