= ANSES =

Argentine social insurance agency

National Social Security Administration (ANSES)
- Administración Nacional de la Seguridad Social

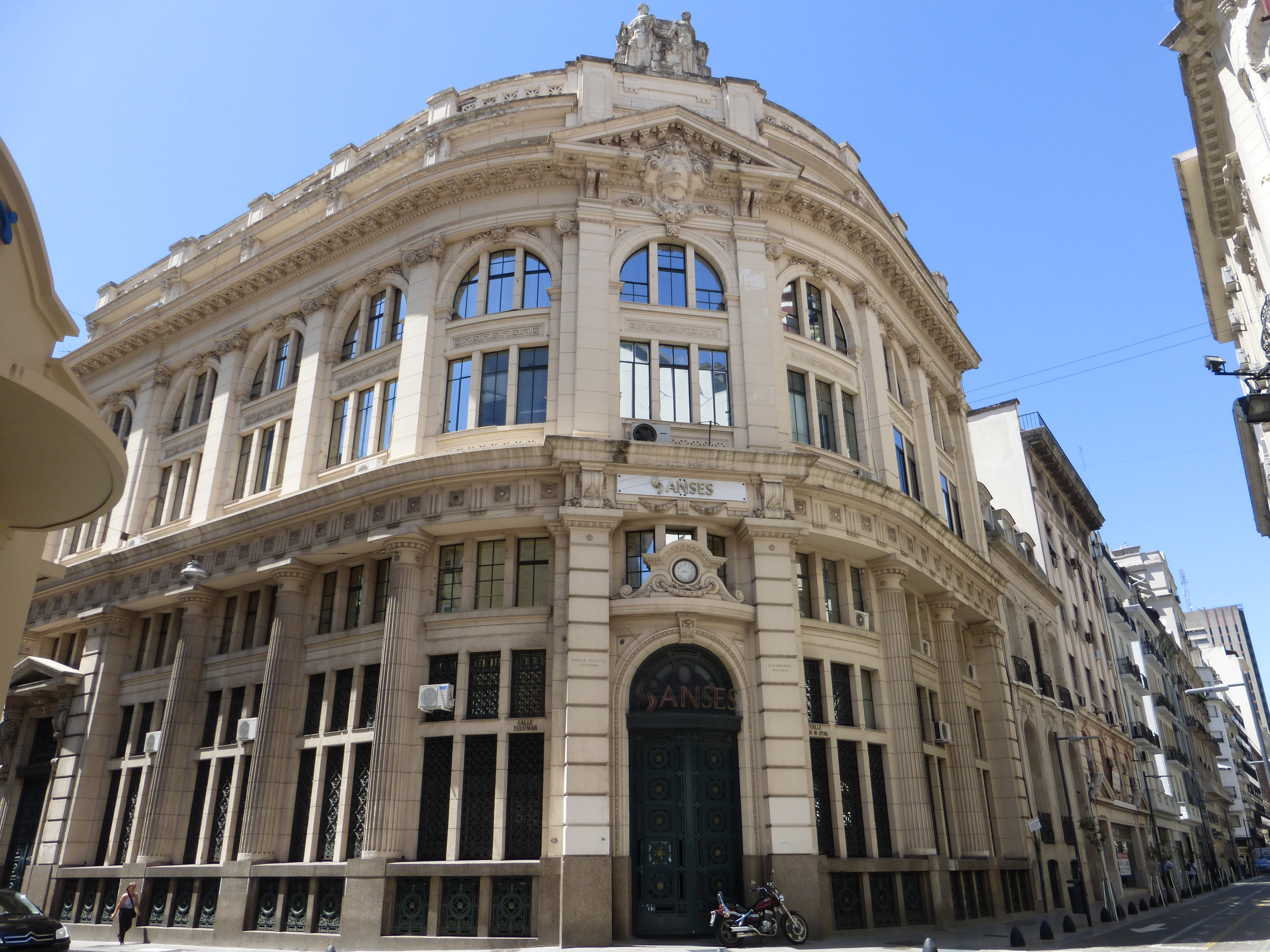
- ANSES building in Buenos Aires (2015)

Agency overview
- Formed: December 27, 1992; 33 years ago
- Preceding agencies: Instituto Nacional de Previsión Social (1944–68; 1990–92); Sistema Nacional de Previsión Social (1968–90)
- Jurisdiction: Government of Argentina
- Headquarters: Buenos Aires
- Employees: 16,000
- Annual budget: us$40 billion (2011)
- Agency executive: Mariano de Los Heros, Executive Director
- Parent department: Secretariat of Labour, Employment and Social Security
- Parent agency: Ministry of Human Capital
- Website: anses.gob.ar

The National Social Security Administration (Spanish: Administración Nacional de la Seguridad Social; mostly known by its acronym ANSES) is a decentralized Argentine Government social insurance agency managed by the Secretariat of Labour, Employment and Social Security controlled by the Ministry of Human Capital.

In the past, ANSES was under the aegis of the Ministry of Health and Social Development. The agency is the principal administrator of social security and other social benefits in Argentina, including family and childhood subsidies, and unemployment insurance.

== Overview ==
The majority of Argentina's public social programs, aside from those related to health and housing, are administered by ANSES. Around 95% of Argentine senior citizens (5.7 million) receive ANSES pensions, whose amount is adjusted semi-annually. Argentines in the labor force earning less than 5,200 pesos (us$350) monthly, are entitled to benefits upon marriage; pregnancy, birth, or adoption of a child; for maternity leave or prenatal care; and for a disability in a child or spouse, as well as to a modest unemployment insurance benefit for up to 6 months. The most important poverty relief program administered by the ANSES is the Asignación Universal por Hijo (Universal Childhood Entitlement). The benefit, 340 pesos (us$70) a month per child, is assigned to 3.6 million children under age 18 (30% of the nation's total), and includes the deposit of 20% of the check in a savings account accessible only upon certification of the child's vaccination and enrollment in school. The program was budgeted at around us$2.5 billion for 2011 (6% of the total). Other recent programs include Conectar Igualdad, which envisaged the purchase of 3 million netbooks for secondary school students and teachers; and PRO.CRE.AR, a subsidized mortgage initiative for moderate income borrowers largely shut out of the nation's tight credit market.

The ANSES is funded by an 11% withholding tax rate and payroll taxes (56%), as well as by a share of value added and other tax receipts (22%), contributions from the national budget (17%), and interest receipts (4%). Expenses include social security payments (63%), transfers to provincial and other pension funds (20%), family assistance (12%), and the netbook program (2%); administrative expenses were around 2%. The agency maintains a stabilization fund, the Sustainability Guarantee Fund (FGS), which held approximately us$46 billion in a variety of financial instruments as of December 2011, of which 58% was held in government securities, 14% in productive investment, 12% in time deposits, and 9% in the Buenos Aires Stock Exchange.

The ANSES issues a Código Único de Identificación Laboral (Labor Identification Code) to all registered workers covered under the Public Pension System (SIJP).

== History ==
=== Development of pension funds ===
Social security was first implemented in what today is Argentina in 1785, when the Viceroy of Río de la Plata, Nicolás del Campo, enacted bereavement benefits for widows and orphans of Navy personnel. These benefits would later be extended to veterans of the Argentine War of Independence and later conflicts. Mutual aid societies that provided disability and pension benefits to members were established throughout the nineteenth century by guilds, as well as by immigrant associations; these latter included Unione e Benevolenza and the Asociación Española de Socorros Mutuos.

The first official social security system in Argentina was established by Law 4.349, signed by President Julio Roca in 1904. The act, one of the first of its kind in Latin America, provided retirement and disability benefits to government employees and created the Civil Retirement and Pension Fund, enrollment in which was voluntary.

President Hipólito Yrigoyen, elected in 1916, pursued the extension of these benefits to workers in other sectors. Retirement funds were thus established for railroad employees in 1921; for those in public services in 1922; and for banking and insurance employees in 1923. He failed, however, to do likewise for retail workers, whose employers staged a lockout, and succeeded in scuttling the reform. The Great Depression seriously weakened these funds, and the Civil Service Fund alone suffered a deficit of over twenty times its reserve by 1931. The increase in deductions and subsequent economic recovery allowed further expansion of pension coverage, with funds established in 1939 for port and newspaper employees.

=== The National Pension System ===
Juan Atilio Bramuglia, the first director of the INPS. The INPS became the first social security agency in Argentina

An initiative by Juan Atilio Bramuglia, chief counsel for the Unión Ferroviaria (at the time the most important union in the CGT), and by Labor Secretary Juan Perón, promoted the Labor Department to a cabinet-level post and, in 1944, established the National Institute for Social Insurance (INPS). The INPS converted the voluntary pension funds, which covered 3% of the total population, into a compulsory system for all employees, effective January 1, 1945, and thus became the first universal social insurance system in Argentina. Perón, elected president in 1946, had retirement and disability benefits included in the Workers' Bill of Rights, enacted on February 24, 1947; this Bill of Rights was subsequently incorporated into the 1949 Constitution as Article 14-b. The self-employed, who account for a fourth of the nation's work force, were incorporated into the Independent Workers' Scheme in 1955. The INPS replaced the former guild funds' capitalization financing for a PAYGO system, and by 1955, would cover 80% of the population. Participation rates in social security among the self-employed would remain among the lowest, however, and the majority evaded the system in subsequent decades.

Following President Perón's 1955 overthrow, the 1949 Constitution was rescinded. Article 14-b, however, was reaffirmed by the 1957 Assembly, thus endorsing the continuity of the social security system, among other social and labor law reforms, with the support of most of the nation's political spectrum. A new payments indexation system was enacted by President Arturo Frondizi in 1958. Minimum monthly pensions were set that ranged from 70% (for those retiring at age 60) to 82% (at age 65) of a contributor's real average earnings during the best three years from the last 10 years of employment. This schedule, popularly known in Argentina as the 82% móvil, led to deficits in the INPS by 1962, and to the reduction of payments to below the 82% ratio; resulting lawsuits were curtailed by a 1967 order. The myriad funds in the INPS were reorganized in 1968 into a National Pension System (NPS) with three general funds for private and public employees and the self-employed, respectively. Each of the nation's provinces also maintained pension funds for local and provincial government staff. The 82% ratio was limited to those who contributed for at least 30 years, and in 1973, the latter stipulation was dropped with the caveat that the pension-income ratio would be 70%.

The system's principal weakness became the chronically high rates of evasion by contributors. Participation never exceeded half the estimated work force, and those who contributed typically under-reported income; among the self-employed, evasion rates rose to around two-thirds. The system's finances, nevertheless, remained nearly balanced as late as 1978. The dictatorship in power at the time enacted changes that adversely impacted the pension system, however. Indexation of payments was slowed in 1979 to rates well below inflation, and monthly pensions, which remained at 65% of each worker's reported pre-retirement income in 1978, fell to 40% by 1980. The system's revenue framework was also affected by the replacement of employer contributions (15% of employees' wages) for an earmarked share of the value added tax (which was raised). The NPS would be further strained by the 1981 collapse of Economy Minister José Alfredo Martínez de Hoz's policies of financial deregulation. Compliance eroded and with it, the real value of pensions which, by 1987, had fallen to 25% of pre-retirement income. A wave of lawsuits against the NPS thus followed, and in 1986, President Raúl Alfonsín ordered an injunction against further liens on NPS accounts.

The NPS was officially superseded in 1990 by the INPS, an interim agency during whose tenure a two-tier system was established; three pension funds operated by the NPS, as well as three family assistance funds, were merged. These changes were adopted, with modifications, in the establishment of the ANSES on December 27, 1992, through Decree 2741/91 signed a year earlier by President Carlos Menem.

=== ANSES ===
The first Director of ANSES was Arnaldo Cisilino, who had directed the INPS. Cisilino oversaw the absorption of the INPS into ANSES, completed in 1994, and had an IBM computer system installed in the antiquated agency. Debts stemming from lawsuits filed from 1987 onward were settled in 1993 with government bonds and funds obtained from the privatization of the state oil concern, YPF. Cisilino stepped down in 1995, and was succeeded as director by Alejandro Bramer Markovic. Bramer Markovic, who was also named Director of PAMI (the national public health insurance system for the elderly and disabled), inherited yawning deficits at ANSES, which reached us$2.8 billion in the first half of 1996.

These were exacerbated by numerous factors, including the 1995 recession, and a portfolio of up to 300,000 fraudulent pensions estimated to cost ANSES nearly a billion dollars annually. The most pervasive challenge to the 20 billion-dollar agency's finances, however, resulted from the 1994 introduction of private pension funds (AFJP), whose enrollees were barred from returning to the ANSES system. He reduced benefit abuse and had charges filed against Cisilino for the no bid IBM contracts, which later resulted in the latter's indictment for fraud. Bramer Markovic, however, was an outsider to President Menem's political circle, and was replaced in January 1998 by Saúl Bouer, a former Mayor of Buenos Aires. Bouer, like his predecessor, faced an ongoing wave of lawsuits filed by those contesting their pension determination, which averaged us$300 a month. Bouer advocated a greater willingness to settle with plaintiffs, as well as an increase in the us$150 minimum pension. Bouer's proposals were rejected, however, and he resigned in December 1998; he was succeeded by Leopoldo van Cauwlaert.

Newly elected President Fernando de la Rúa appointed San Isidro Mayor Melchor Posse as interim Director General of ANSES in January 2000. President de la Rúa transferred ANSES from the Economy Ministry to the Labor Ministry. The agency was near insolvency as a result of a 40% fall in contributions since the inaugural of the private AFJP system, a new recession, and mounting lawsuits. Rulings favoring retirees had cost ANSES us$1.4 billion from 1995 to 1999, and us$2.1 billion in 2000, alone. The President placed ANSES under Federal intervention in November in preparation for his proposed abolition of the agency in favor of the private AFJP system. Posse resigned and was succeeded by former Tucumán Province Congressman Martín Campero. The worsening economic crisis prompted President de la Rúa's July 10, 2001, "zero deficit" decree, which led to a 13% cut in public sector wages and pensions alike. Campero resigned, and was succeeded on an interim basis by Douglas Lyall. The crisis forced Lyall to curtail unemployment benefits in order to meet retirement benefit obligations; the resignation of Labor Minister Patricia Bullrich in December led to Lyall's replacement by Gustavo Macchi.

President de la Rúa resigned amid social unrest on December 21, upon which interim President Adolfo Rodríguez Saá decreed an emergency benefit cap of 2400 pesos per beneficiary for one year. Appointing Sergio Massa as Director of ANSES in January 2002, President Eduardo Duhalde enacted the first raise in the minimum pension since 1992 (a one-third increase). Massa was confirmed in the post by President Néstor Kirchner following his May 2003 inaugural. Massa, who had supported the 1993 law that established the private AFJP network, oversaw the voluntary conversion of around two million AFJP accounts to the ANSES' aegis when this choice was made available in March 2007. He remained as director until 2007, when he was elected Mayor of Tigre. Kirchner's wife and successor, President Cristina Fernández de Kirchner, appointed Claudio Moroni in December 2007, and in May 2008, the latter was replaced for Amado Boudou, who had served as the agency's Comptroller since 2001 and as Secretary General since 2007.

The principal weakness in the private AFJP system was the high rate of commissions, which exceeded 30% of total monthly contributions, and reached as high as 54%. Private pension funds, moreover, suffered large losses during the crisis from 1998 to 2002, and by 2008 the state subsidized 77% of the funds' beneficiaries, including 40% whose annuities could not cover minimum monthly pensions; of the funds' 9.5 million affiliates, nearly 6 million had stopped making contributions. The 2008 financial crisis exacerbated the problem and in October, President Cristina Kirchner announced plans for the nationalization of the funds' investments of nearly US$30 billion. These accounts were transferred to the ANSES, while leaving contributors the freedom to invest in private pension funds.

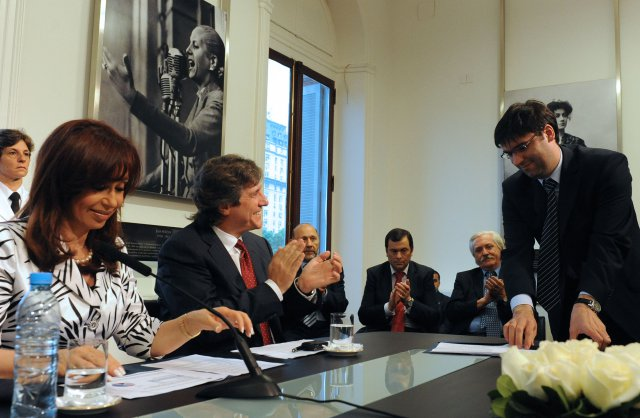
President Cristina Fernández de Kirchner, Economy Minister Amado Boudou, and ANSES Director Diego Bossio during the signing of conventions related to the Universal Childhood Entitlement program, November 2009

The resulting Integrated Social Security System (SIPA), administered by the ANSES, would be backed by the Sustainability Guarantee Fund (FGS). The FGS is a stabilization fund also established in response to the 2008 financial crisis, as well as to the rapid growth in the number of ANSES accounts. This latter development began when the transfer of AFJP accounts was made possible in 2007, and was bolstered by the Social Security Inclusion Plan, which allowed the entry of 2.5 million retirees into the system who had earlier been excluded due to insufficient contributions. Boudou was appointed Economy Minister in July 2009, and he was succeeded by Mortgage Bank Director Diego Bossio.

President Cristina Kirchner further enhanced the role of ANSES in social policy. She signed the Pensions Mobility Law in 2008, which provides for semi-annual increases in the benefits schedule, thus formalizing a policy adopted by her husband and predecessor, Néstor Kirchner. Minimum pensions, which had been frozen from 1992 to 2002, rose by nearly 600% by 2010. She also enacted the Universal Childhood Entitlement in 2009. The benefit, contingent upon proof of a child's vaccination and enrollment in school, reached 30% of children, and directly resulted in a reduction in the nation's overall poverty rate from 26% to 22.6% within a year of its implementation.

Following the loss of the Front for Victory's absolute majorities in both houses of Congress, opposition lawmakers passed a bill on October 14, 2010, reinstating the 82% móvil schedule. The President vetoed the bill, citing the improvements gained by the Inclusion and Mobility Laws, as well as the cost of the bill itself, which would increase ANSES spending by us$10 billion, and force the sale of us$19 billion in securities held by the FGS (56% of the total in 2010). The size and growth of the FGS portfolio, which grew by 60% in US dollar terms in the three years after the absorption of AFJP pensions in late 2008, accompanied an increased reliance on the FGS for national budgetary borrowing requirements. The FGS held us$27 billion in government bonds at the end of 2011; a further US$6.5 billion finances fixed investment by the state or sponsored enterprises.

The agency's stock portfolio, nearly half of which is in Telecom Argentina, Banco Macro, and Siderar, prompted an initiative in April 2011 to extend the number of companies with an ANSES member in the Board of Directors from 27 to all 42 in which it holds a significant stake. Techint, Siderar's parent company, became the least amenable among these companies to the proposal; a quarter of Siderar stock is owned by ANSES, but company bylaws limited the agency's voting rights to 5%. An agreement was ultimately produced in July whereby Economy Ministry official Axel Kicillof would be seated at the board of directors in return for government approval of the company's dividend policy.

The importance of ANSES in the nation's social policy was further enhanced in June 2012 with the announcement of the PRO.CRE.AR initiative. Funded by ANSES and managed by the National Mortgage Bank, the home loan program was projected to make over us$4 billion available over four years to finance the construction of 100,000 new homes for private ownership. These loans would be available to those earning from 1,800 to 30,000 pesos (us$400 to 6,650) a month at relatively low interest rates and long terms (4 to 16%, with initial rates 2% below these, and 20 to 30 years, in each case depending on income), and would be complemented by a grant of 1,820 hectares (4,500 acres) by the National Government.

In December 2015, president Mauricio Macri appointed Emilio Basavilbaso as executive director.

== Executive Directors ==
Director	Term
Arnaldo Cisilino	1992–1995
Alejandro Bramer Markovic	1995–1998
Saúl Bouer	1998
Leopoldo van Cauwlaert	1998–2000
Melchor Posse	2000
Martín Campero	2000–2001
Douglas Lyall	2001
Gustavo Macchi	2001–2002
Sergio Massa	2002–2007
Claudio Moroni	2007–2008
Amado Boudou	2008–2009
Diego Bossio	2009–2015
Emilio Basavilbaso	2015–2019
Alejandro Vanoli	2019–2020
Fernanda Raverta	2019–2024
Mariano de Los Heros	2024–present
