= Sergio Tasselli =

Italian-Argentinian businessman

Sergio Tasselli is an Italian-Argentinian businessman. He is the head of one of the largest business groups in Argentina and has been called “the most successful businessman of recent times” in that country.

As of 2004, he has been running “twenty companies operating in the generation and distribution of power, metallurgy (Materfer, Electroaleaciones, Aceros Zapla), petrochemicals (Bermúdez), agricultural machinery (Agrinar), and the food sector (Bruning Mill).” His offices are on Avenida Cerviño, in the Buenos Aires neighborhood of Palermo.

Tasselli has been described as having benefited greatly from the program of privatization during the Menem presidency and then having profited under the subsequent presidencies of Nestor Kirchner and Cristina Fernández de Kirchner. The Argentinian media routinely describe him as a “K businessman,” or Kirchner businessman – that is, someone who has profited from his connections to the Kirchner government. La Nación stated in 2004 that here is “always a pall of suspicion” hanging over his businesses. His alleged mismanagement of several branches of the national railway has been faulted for deadly train accidents, and a mining accident that killed 14 people in 2004 in the province of Santa Cruz was attributed to his alleged mismanagement of the mines.

He has been investigated, prosecuted, and fined for many irregularities in the conduct of his businesses, but has not yet been imprisoned.

== Early life and education ==
Tasselli was born on November 10, 1944. He was born in Italy and moved to Argentina as a small child.

As a young man, he was reportedly a member of the Montoneros, a left-wing guerrilla and subversive group of the 1960s and 70s.

== Career ==
According to La Nación, Tasselli built a group of businesses “practically from the ground up” with help from his political contacts, most of them members of the circle surrounding President Menem circle. He has been described as having built his empire by taking control of privatized companies and buying factories in auctions. According to La Nación, Tasselli “became a specialist in closing deals with the state.” Indymedia describes Tasselli as having been a “front man” for Menem, benefiting from “all the government concessions” during Menem's presidency. “Because of subsidies received from the government,” Indymedia maintains, “Tasselli is the most powerful businessman in Argentina.”

Tasselli's relationship with the Kirchner family reportedly began in 1994, when he was put in charge of the concession of Yacimientos Carboníferos Fiscales. A September 2004 Indymedia article was headlined “Sergio Tasselli: Kirchner Has His Yabrán,” a reference to Alfredo Yabrán, a businessman who had profited through his intimate connection to the government of Carlos Menem.

Early in his career, he is said to have kept a “low profile.” As of July 2003, he had reportedly never granted an interview and declined to be photographed. In that year, La Nación called him “a new strongman in the business world,” said that “Taccelli is quietly building an economic empire,” and stated that his group of companies was growing “in the shadows.” La Nación noted that Tasselli's “associates generally do not come from the world of business but from the world of politics, such as former Montoneros leader Mario Montoto.”

Tasselli runs such firms as the Grupo Metropolitano and the electricity companies Edecat (Catamarca) and Edefor (Formosa), but he is not legally listed as the owner or principal shareholder of most of his firms. Instead, the companies are listed variously in the names of his five children and his brother Alberto.

He was a principal shareholder of Electromat, which withdrew from the stock market in 2003.

Tasselli's other firms include, or have included, Trainmet SA, Trainmet Servicios SA, Tecnica Industrial SA, Socieded Inmobiliaria del Nuevo Puerto, General Plasticos SA, CES SA, Alta Tension SA, Circum SA, SI GE SA, WLI Servicios SA, Compania Desmonte SA, Trainmet Ciccone Servicios SA, Finca Los Alerces SA, Mic. Inversiones Peri SA, Yacimientos del Sur SA, Flio Morado 53, IATE – Astra SA, IATE – Y.P.F., Zapla Holdings SA, Trainmet Seguros SA, Centrales Termicas SA, Centrales Termicas del NEA SA, Centrales Termicas Patagonica SA, Centrales Termicas Sorrento SA, Transnea SA, Transnoa SA, Empresa de Distribucion de Energia Electrica SA, IATE SA, Rafaela Alimentos SA, Retroquimica Bermudez SA, Red de los Supermercados SA, Curticor SA, San Jorge Mayorista de Alimentos SA, Materfer SA.

=== YCRT ===
Tasselli took over the Yacimiento Rio Turbio (YCRT) coal mines in Santa Cruz after they were privatized in 1994, and ran them until 2001. YCRT was the first business to be de-privatized under Menem. Tasselli reportedly was granted the coal-mining concession at Rio Turbio because he had “become intimate with the Santa Cruz Front for Victory.” During the years when he ran YCRT, the Argentinian government paid $22.5 million annually in subsidies for the mines. Tasselli's control of the mines ended in a scandal that saw the mines re-nationalized in 2001.

In that year, miner Raul Wanzo, acting on behalf of the miners' union, sued Tasselli for mismanagement, corruption, smuggling, and other charges. During Tasselli's tenure, the number of miners had reportedly dropped by more than three quarters, safety measures deteriorated, and production declined. Also, when he took over the mines, he replaced contractors with his own firms. “Tasselli's management of Rio Turbio was worse than a war,” charged IndyMedia. “They stole everything they could steal.” YCRT became “the first company to return to the state after being privatized during the decade the government of Carlos Menem.” The episode has been described as a “failed privatization.”

When an explosion and collapse took place at one of the mines in 2004, killing 14 miners, Tasselli was accused of having caused it. Miners' union spokespeople attributed the mine disaster “directly to the lack of investment” in YCRT by Tasselli.

A lawyer for the miners' union, Safrani Bernardino, directly accused Kirchner and Tasselli of responsibility for the 14 miners' deaths. Bernardino said that the workers had died as a consequence of “apathy” on the part of Tasselli and others who had made them “work as if they were animals.” The miners were, Bernardino said, the victims of a “coincidence of interests and politics.” According to charges, he had not invested “a single penny of the $ 22.5 million received per year in subsidies” in new machinery, necessary safety measures, or in the opening of new mines. He was also accused of stealing company machinery, trucks, trains, and tools, and of importing machinery and vehicles tax-free through YCRT and then using them in other Tasselli-run companies. It was further charged that YCRF had lost money on suspicious payments to creditor firms that were mainly owned by him.

In May 2010, Federal Judge Sergio Torres summoned Tasselli to testify for possible crimes involving the alleged depletion of the Rio Turbio coal mine that occurred while he was running YCRT between 1994 and 2002. Tasselli was accused of diverting state assets to benefit his own companies, employing accounting maneuvers to evade taxes, violating various commitments, allowing rolling stock to be destroyed, among other charges. Torres cited a long list of YCRT assets that had been diverted to other firms. It was argued that these actions could well be responsible for the deadly mine accident of June 14, 2004. Tasselli was accused by Torres of emptying the coal company, mismanagement, smuggling, diverting state funds, engaging in accounting maneuvers to evade taxes, failing to return movable and immovable state property placed in his charge, allowing locomotives and rolling stock to fall into disrepair, and violating production commitments. On November 23, 2011, Torres ordered Tasselli to stand trial and ordered a seizing of his assets until the state could recover 45 million pesos that he was accused of having defrauded from YCRT.

On February 7, 2012, Wanzo filed with the Court of Appeals for recovery of assets that Tasselli had allegedly stolen from YCRT. Wanzo charged that Tasselli had “killed people with corruption” by “diverting subsidies provided to him by the State” to his own personal accounts. Wanzo stated that Tasselli had followed the same approach in Metropolitan, Rock-San Martin, Edecat SA, Parmalat SA, Acepar, and other companies under his control, taking money from government subsidies “at the cost of death and destruction of jobs.” In mid March 2014, at the request of prosecutor Federico Delgado, Torres summoned Tasselli for questioning on March 26, 2014.

=== Edecat ===
His electrical firm in Catamarca, Edecat, was allegedly involved in 2003 in what La Nacion described as a $10 million “scam.”

=== Altos Hornos de Zapla ===
The Tasselli group also ran the firm Altos Hornos de Zapla, which was privatized under Menem. Senator Gerardo Morales announced in January 2004 that the national government would cease dealings with the firm, citing an alleged breach of contract.

=== Metropolitano ===
Tasselli began his involvement in the railway sector in 2000. His firm Metropolitano is the concessionaire for the railway lines Belgrano south and San Martin. It was also the concessionaire for the Roca line, which was returned to the state “in the midst of allegations of deficiencies in the services provided.” As of 2004, Metropolitano was billing $650 million a year and employed 12,000 people. In July of that year, he was engaged in a “full legal dispute with the government over the decision to rescind the contract to operate the San Martin branch” as well. During that dispute, he said that he was being “persecuted” by Transportation Secretary Ricardo Jaime.

During the 1990s and 2000s, Tasselli was the defendant in many court cases involving his mismanagement of the rail services.

In December 2002, the Duhalde government passed a measure under which Tasselli, as owner of Metropolitano, was given 400,000 pesos a day in government subsidies while, according to widespread complaints, not investing any of that money in the railroad. Critics of his management of the railway assets have long objected to what they describe as a suspect relationship between Tasselli and the Minister of Planning and Public Investment, Julio De Vido. One point of contention was his dismissal of what was described as “the effective staff of former Ferrocarriles Argentinos,” which had provided the railway lines with maintenance and security, and hired in its place an allegedly less efficient company called Industrial Technical SA, which is owned by the Tasselli group. Moreover, Tasselli was accused of stealing machinery, tools, lathes, and other equipment from the railroads that ended up “as if by magic” at other Tasselli firms. “Tasselli would never have carried out such theft without the complicity of the government,” maintained IndyMedia.

A March 2014 report by the Senate General Audit Office stated that 120 people had died and 1500 sustained wounds on Argentinian trains between 2002 and 2012. The crashes mainly involved trains run by Tasselli's firm Metropolitano.

=== Parmalat ===
In September 2004, Tasselli bought the Argentinian subsidiary of the Italian dairy group Parmalat. He acquired his stake in Parmalat Argentina through his firm Molinos Bruning. Tasselli reportedly bought Parmalat Argentina with a token payment of one euro and, as a result of the purchase, acquired debts of over 200 million pesos. Ten days after taking control of Parmalat Argentina, in order to restructure the firm, whose name they had changed to Compañía Láctea del Sur, Tasselli's group filed for bankruptcy on behalf of the firm.

=== Centrales Térmicas Patagónicas ===
Among the many firms run by Tasselli is the electrical firm Centrales Térmicas Patagónicas, which owns electrical generators in Puerto Madryn, Comodoro Rivadavia, and Pico Truncado, filed for reorganization in June 2009. At the time it was owned 17% by Sergio Tasselli, 17% by IATE (a firm owned by Tasselli and his brother Alberto), 17% by Luz y Fuerza, 25.88% by Chubut, 13.12% by the Argentinian government, and 10% by its employees.

=== Sorrento ===
Tasselli was the principal shareholder in the Santa Fe electrical firm Sorrento as of August 2009. In that month it was reported that he had dismissed more than 60 employees of Sorrento. His action was denounced by the workers' union, which charged that he planned to close the plant and sell it off. He denied that he had such plans and said that it was legally impossible to sell the plant because of contractual requirements.

== Legal activity ==
=== Lawsuit with brother ===
It was reported on May 21, 2012, that Tasselli was “on the verge of a public trial for allegedly defrauding his own brother, Alberto Tasselli, of almost $2 million” and that the Court of Criminal Appeal had just rejected a request filed by Tasselli's lawyer, Mariano Di Meglio, to dismiss a March 8 decision to prosecute him for fraud. Tasselli was accused by his brother of “abusing his powers of attorney” in 1993 “to divert to his or others' advantage sums of money belonging to the company IATE SA” in a matter involving another firm, NEP SA.

=== Accusations of financial irregularities ===
In March 2001 Tasselli, as proxy for IATE SA, reportedly transferred $1,150,000 in company funds to an account in his name at Bank Boston NA in Montevideo. Some months later, he transferred $800,000.

Tasselli said in August 2005 that Paraguayan steelmaker Acepar, of which he was president, was up to date on payments to that country's government. His statement followed a request by President Nicanor Duarte that Acepar pay its total debt to Paraguay of some $24 million from its 1997 privatization. Nicolás Caballero, general secretary of Acepar's union Sitrasa, said there was evidence that Acepar had not invested sufficiently in the steel mill. “The machinery is in a dreadful state, they are neither buying supplies to guarantee normal plant operation nor is there a clear sales policy from the management,” he said.

Tasselli's firm Molinos Bruning, based in Santa Fe, was sued in provincial federal court by the AFIP for tax evasion. Complaints about irregularities in the firm led to three searches, performed at two locations in Santa Fe (San Jorge and Rosario) and one in Tucumán.

A September 2009 report stated that private flights by Nestor and Cristina Kirchner had cost an average of $100,000 a month, and that one of the planes on which they had flown was a Lear Jet owned by Tasselli's son Mariano.

The Argentinian government fined Edesur $280,000 for breach of contract.

La Federación Económica de Catamarca (FEC) said that the provincial government should terminate a concession contract with Edecat SA because of lack of investment, poor service, and overcharging. Edecat, however, ignored resolutions by the FEC and by the provincial government calling on it to improve its performance.

In 2011 Tasselli began to run the dairy firm Gándara, an enterprise that ended in bankruptcy.

Tasselli was accused in 2013 of becoming involved in the steel mill Aceros del Paraguay (Acepar) in an illegal manner. According to a Paraguayan newspaper, since the Paraguayan government was the main shareholder of Aceros, and since the firm owed the government money, Tasselli could not legally become its majority shareholder, which he did, without paying the debt, which he did not.

It was reported on August 17, 2013, that Tasselli had a Swiss bank account for the Edefor firm in the amount of $5.4 million, and that he was being investigated for money laundering by the Finance Intelligence Unit Suisse. He reportedly held several Swiss accounts in his own name. Among the irregular transactions investigated by the Swiss was a transfer of $7.4 million from an account in his name n ABN Amro Bank to another Dutch account. Also he transferred almost $20 million from the Royal Bank of Canada to an account in Geneva in his name. Also, he deposited $3 million in various Swiss banks. The suspicious deposits took place between August 2003 and April 2009. Swiss authorities asked Tasselli to explain the transactions but as of August 7 had received no reply. Consequently, Swiss federal prosecutor Frederic Schaller requested cooperation in the matter from Argentina's Ministry of Justice.

Gustavo Correa, president of Vetorial Brazil, denied in August 2014 that his firm, which had taken control of Aceros del Paraguay (Acepar) had any relationship with Tasselli, who was accused of having left the company's coffers empty until it reached the brink of bankruptcy.

=== ATE slogan ===
In 2000 the union of Argentinian government workers, ATE, popularized a slogan: “Tasselli Out!”
