= Mario Montoto =

Argentine businessman and politician

Mario Montoto (born December 23, 1956, in La Plata) is an Argentine businessman and politician. His company Codesur provides military products and services to the Argentinian military and other clients, and the firm's Global View division supplies surveillance cameras to Buenos Aires and other municipalities.

Montoto is well known for his background as a member of the Montoneros, a Peronist-left guerilla group of the 1970s for which he served as the chief legal advisor and financial officer. He is equally well known for his subsequent transformation into a friend and ally of successive Argentinian presidents, as well as other politicians and businessmen, his connections with whom are considered to be the principal reason for his business success.

== Early life and education ==
Montoto was born in La Plata on December 23, 1956. His father was a civil and commercial judge, and later a member of the Court of Appeals. At the age of 12, Montoto began to attend the Instituto de Investigaciones Históricas Juan Manuel de Rosas. While he was there, he joined a reading and discussion group that went on to form the Alianza de la Juventud Peronista (the Alliance of Peronist Youth).

He and Nestor Kirchner, the future President of Argentina, were friends while attending law school together in La Plata.

Montoto created the first Unión de Estudiantes Secundarios (UES, Union of Secondary Students) to be formed in La Plata after Peron's third term.

=== Montoneros ===
Montoto joined the Montoneros, the leftist urban guerrilla group, in 1973, while still in upper secondary school.

In 1975, he survived a murder attempt by the Triple A (the Argentine Anticommunist Alliance) when a gun was put to his head but malfunctioned. In late 1976 he relocated from La Plata to Buenos Aires; leaving the country briefly in 1977, returning and then leaving again several times in connection with his resistance work with the Montoneros. While a member of the Montoneros, he served as secretary and legal representative to Mario Firmenich, the head of the guerrilla group. In addition, Montoto is said to have been the “chief financial operator” of the Montoneros. Moreover, it has been stated that during his Montoneros years, Montoto, operating under the pseudonym of Dr. Paz, made monthly visits to the offices of financier David Graiver, a Soviet front, to collect money intended for the Montoneros.

Montoto, whose codename in the Montoneros was Pascualito, was also the godfather to Firmenich's daughter. Montoto has rejected the charge that the Montonero counteroffensive of 1979 and 1980 was a massacre.

During his years in the Montoneros, Montoto was married to María Inés Raverta, with whom he had two children. In 1980, when she was 24 years old, she was abducted by the Army and held in Lima, Peru, as part of an operation to try to capture the Montonero leader Roberto Perdia, who was then in Lima. Raverta was never seen again, and continues to be regarded as one of the “disappeared.”

In 1990 Menem pardoned Firmenich and other Montoneros, and thereafter Montoto was active in the political conversion of the Montoneros movement into “Revolutionary Peronism.” According to author Miguel Bonasso, Montoto was the key figure in a process whereby the Revolutionary Peronists allegedly funneled sizable campaign contributions to Menem in exchange for the pardons.

He has been described as a man living in two worlds and as “the man of the two revolutions,” and has been the target of criticism for the eagerness with which he has forged alliances with people who had executed his comrades. “The conversion of Montoto is notorious,” stated the left-wing daily La Izquierda Diario, “because he was enriched under Menemism and placed himself in the path of 'crazy' Rodolfo Galimberti, who turned him into a show-business and security entrepreneur.” The newspaper described his “conversion” from radical to capitalist, profiting from privatization, as “shameless and obscene.”

== Career ==
In the early days of his business career, Montoto sold clothing and watches in the city of Paso de los Libres. In partnership with Spanish entrepreneurs, he founded Background, a firm that rented offices in Maipú by the hour. The enterprise was not successful, however. He later joined other Spanish partners in establishing a firm that hooked up homes for natural gas. In 1994, he and Sergio Tasselli took part in the privatization of Yacimientos Carboniferous Fiscales in Rio Turbio, a mine where an accident later took the lives of many miners.

=== Trainmet Ciccone Systems ===
Montoto's major early success in business was the formation of Trainmet Ciccone Systems (TCS) in 1998. This company, which he founded after several economic failures, and of which he served as president, supplies IBM-manufactured ticket vending machines for collective transport. Montoto founded this firm in collaboration with Ciccone Calcografico, the printing firm at the center of the Boudougate scandal. Montoto is also said to have managed Ciccone Calcografico's contracts involving the printing of diplomas and other documents.

=== Metropolitano ===
Montoto went on to be the president of Metropolitano, a railway consortium. During Montoto's tenure in this position, the General Audit Office and ARI both issued reports stating that the awarding of this concession to him had led to deterioration in the railway service. Montoto's partnership in this and other early ventures with Sergio Tasselli, a leading K-businessman, also raised questions at the time. In 2003, La Nación said that Tasselli, whose businesses, according to the newspaper, are always under “a pall of suspicion,” was “quietly building an economic empire” that was growing “in the shadows,” and that his “associates generally do not come from the world of business but from the world of politics, such as former Montoneros leader Mario Montoto.” Instead of improving the train service provided by Metropolitano, Montoto reportedly directed Alejandra Rafuls to film train operations and to edit the film in such a way as to make it look as if customers were themselves responsible for the service problems.

When Kirchner became president of Argentina, Montoto quit the presidency of Metropolitano and formed Codesur.

=== Codesur ===
Montoto founded Codesur (Corporación para la Defensa del Sur), which provides military products and services, in September 2003. “His old enemies,” commented La Nacion, “have become his customers and employees.” The firm maintained the submarine Salta and, in partnership with the Israeli firm IAI, was involved in the structural maintenance of the presidential plane, the Tango 01. The firm repairs engines for the Army's Bell helicopters. Among its executives are a major general, a brigadier, and a vice-admiral, all retired. Codesur has working relationships with several major foreign firms such as Azimut, Saymar, and Honeywell.

One commentator has noted that Codesur was founded “just in time for the coming to power of Néstor Kirchner.” “Montoto did not waste much time,” Poder Magazine has stated. In November 2003 he registered his company as a government supplier. He has been described as “one of the leading representatives of 'montomanagement' in the 90s and today,” a reference to former Montoneros who have become successful businessmen through their partnership with the Kirchner government.

In addition to his friendship with Kirchner, Montoto's close relationship with Buenos Aires governor Daniel Scioli has played a key role in his business success. He has advised Scioli on security issues, has been described as a “sidekick of Governor Daniel Scioli,” and is said to be the main supplier of the Buenos Aires municipal police. Montoto has publicly praised Scioli as “a pioneer in the fight against insecurity” and lauded his “bravery and courage.” Montoto has been described as a creature of Carlos Menem who was later taken under the wing of Daniel Scioli. Scioli, says one source, depends on Montoto and spends extensive time with him discussing topics including campaign strategy. Montoto accompanied Scioli on a trip to Israel in 2010.

One source has described Montoto's list of close friends as “tainted by controversy: in addition to Scioli, Firmenich, and the late Rodolfo Galimberti, another ex-Montonero who became a businessman, he maintains close friendships with media entrepreneur Daniel Hadad and consultant Alejandra Rafuls, who is responsible for his press relations.” Montoto also has close links to Finmeccanica, the scandal-plagued Italian arms firm. A January 2011 report, moreover, stated that the 2011 appointment of Nilda Garre as Security Minister provided Montoto with an opportunity “to equip the Federal Police, security forces, Gendarmerie and Prefectura” with security products. The report said that “Montoto and Garre have a special relationship” founded in their history as members of the Montoneros. Another source, however, has stated that Montoto's relationship with Garre has not been as friendly as his relationships with former Defense Ministers José Pampuro and Arturo Puricelli, and that, by the same token, he is not as close to Cristina Fernandez de Kirchner as he was to Menem and Nestor Kirchner.

Montoto and Daniel Hadad founded Global View in March 2008 as a subsidiary of Comesur. It has provided video surveillance to several Argentine municipalities, including the city of Buenos Aires, Mar del Plata, La Plata, Tiger, Lomas de Zamora, and Rosario. In February 2012, the Japanese NEC Corporation bought 85% of Global View. Montoto retained 15% of the firm and the chairmanship.

Montoto has sold security cameras to Buenos Aires through the Global View company. In 2008, Montoto mounted a “spy system” consisting of over a hundred cameras in 75 “strategic locations” in Buenos Aires. Between August 2009 and July 2010, Codesur won five contracts to install security cameras in Buenos Aires. The firm was contracted to install 300 cameras at first, a number that later increased. In January 2010, Codesur and Cablevision both bid for a new contract with the city to install cameras. Although Cablevision's offer was cheaper, Global View was awarded the contract. The city ended up spending 250 million pesos for 2000 cameras, which experts described as “outrageous” compared to market prices. For example, compared to the 125,000 per camera that Global View charged Buenos Aires, La Matanza paid between 11,000 and 22,000 pesos per camera.

Mototo's negotiations for security cameras with suburban mayors have been described as “rough” and as involving “allegations of overpricing.” According to La Verdad Online, “Many mayors complained about the pressures put upon them from above” to buy security cameras from Montoto, and despite the pressures, many of them “refused to work with Montoto.” In April 2011 Montoto was awarded a contract to install cameras in Bahía Blanca by the city's mayor, Cristian Breitenstein, who was a close ally of Scioli. The contract with Montoto, however, was rejected by the local government, which at the same time approved similar contracts with two other firms.

Codesur acted as an intermediary for Russia's Rosoboronexport when it sought to sell military equipment to the Argentinian military.

=== Other business activities ===
Since 2005, he has published a magazine, DEF, devoted to issues of defense. He also runs a cable TV channel, DEF TV.

=== Taeda Foundation ===
Montoto heads the Taeda Foundation, based in Buenos Aires, which holds events of all kinds related to security and involving Daniel Scioli.

== Personal life ==
Montoto claims to have forgiven the enemies of his youth, including those who apparently killed Raverta.

Montoto and Raverta had two children. In the 1980s, he began a relationship with Kirchnerite national legislator Adela Segarra, who helped him raise his two children. Their relationship later ended, but Segarra continued to maintain a close relationship with Montoto's children, whom, according to some sources close to the family, Montoto also had a son and daughter with Segarra.

Both of Montoto's children with Raverta went on to work in the group HIJOS in Mar del Plata. Fernanda studied at the University of Mar del Plata and became a social worker. She also became president of the Asociación Civil Sol de Mayo, an NGO created in 2007. Her relationship with her father is “almost nil.” His daughter Fernanda Raverta, who was born in November 1973 and who was three years old when her mother was kidnapped, served manager of the headquarters of ANSES (Administración Nacional de la Seguridad Social), Argentina's social-security administration, under the agency's executive director Diego Bossio. She lives in Mar del Plata and entered the Argentinian legislature in July 2011. She is also a “militant” member of La Cámpora, a political youth organization whose purpose has been to lend support to the governments of Néstor Kirchner and Cristina Fernández de Kirchner.

Montoto has been described as having “a very ostentatious lifestyle.” He owns a BMW and a mansion in Palermo Chico, and at one point owned a private jet. He is a devout Catholic, who “is proud of his photos with Pope Benedict XVI and the right-wing Bishop Emilio Ogñenovich.” He has been described as “struggling with his weight” over the years and as maintaining a low profile while accumulating power and becoming a millionaire with “a sumptuous mansion in Barrio Parque.” Many commentators have stated that it is ironic to see a former Montonero driving a BMW.

He professes today to be pro-Israel and pro-American and is a close friend of a number of high Vatican officials. He has also maintained that he and his fellow Montoneros never intended to dissolve the military. Reportedly, Montoto has a huge picture of Evita Peron hanging in his office in Puerto Madero.
