= Andrés Larroque =

Argentine politician

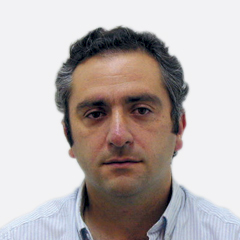

Minister of Community Development of Buenos Aires Province
- Incumbent
- Assumed office 4 May 2020
- Governor: Axel Kicillof
- Preceded by: Fernanda Raverta

National Deputy
- In office 10 December 2019 – 4 May 2020
- Constituency: Buenos Aires
- In office 10 December 2011 – 10 December 2019
- Constituency: City of Buenos Aires

Personal details
- Born: 26 January 1977 (age 49) Buenos Aires, Argentina
- Party: Justicialist Party
- Other political affiliations: Front for Victory (2003–2017); Citizen's Unity (2017–2019); Frente de Todos (2019–present)

Andrés "Cuervo" Larroque (born 26 January 1977 in Buenos Aires) is an Argentine activist and political leader. He was a national deputy for the Autonomous City of Buenos Aires and the Buenos Aires Province for the Front for Victory, Unidad Ciudadana and the Frente de Todos He held the position of Secretary General of La Campora from 2006 to 2023. He currently serves as the Minister of Community Development of Buenos Aires Province.

== Political activism ==
Andrés Larroque's beginnings in political activism date back to 1995, when he took his first steps in the Student Center of the Colegio Nacional de Buenos Aires, where he became president the following year, although he had already participated in political activities since he was 13 years old. Because he constantly wore a shirt of the Club Atlético San Lorenzo de Almagro, also during those years, he was nicknamed "Cuervo" by his classmates, an epithet with which he became forever known.

In the early 2000s, he was one of the founders of the youth group La Campora. Larroque explains that those who were militant from the beginning in the group were Kirchnerists, of course, but without direct links to the government of Néstor Kirchner, that is, inorganic militants. "Then we started going to all of Néstor's events and one day we were called. We had a meeting with him and he thought very much like us, maybe he was on the left of us," he said in an interview with the newspaper La Nación. From then on, the link with Kirchnerism became organic and La Campora became part of the political base of the government.

He became the group's secretary general -as he currently occupies- and later confessed that he was "surprised" by the number of militants who approached the group during the most tense moments of Cristina Kirchner's government: the conflict over the employers' lockout in 2008 and, more recently, the debate over the Media Law. Because of this attendance of young people to La Cámpora, Larroque describes the group as "the opposite of many leaders today who have attacks of selective peronitis and others who betrayed the popular will months after taking office".
