= Banco Hipotecario =

Commercial bank in Argentina

Coordinates: 34°36′23.3″S 58°22′19.3″W

Banco Hipotecario S.A.

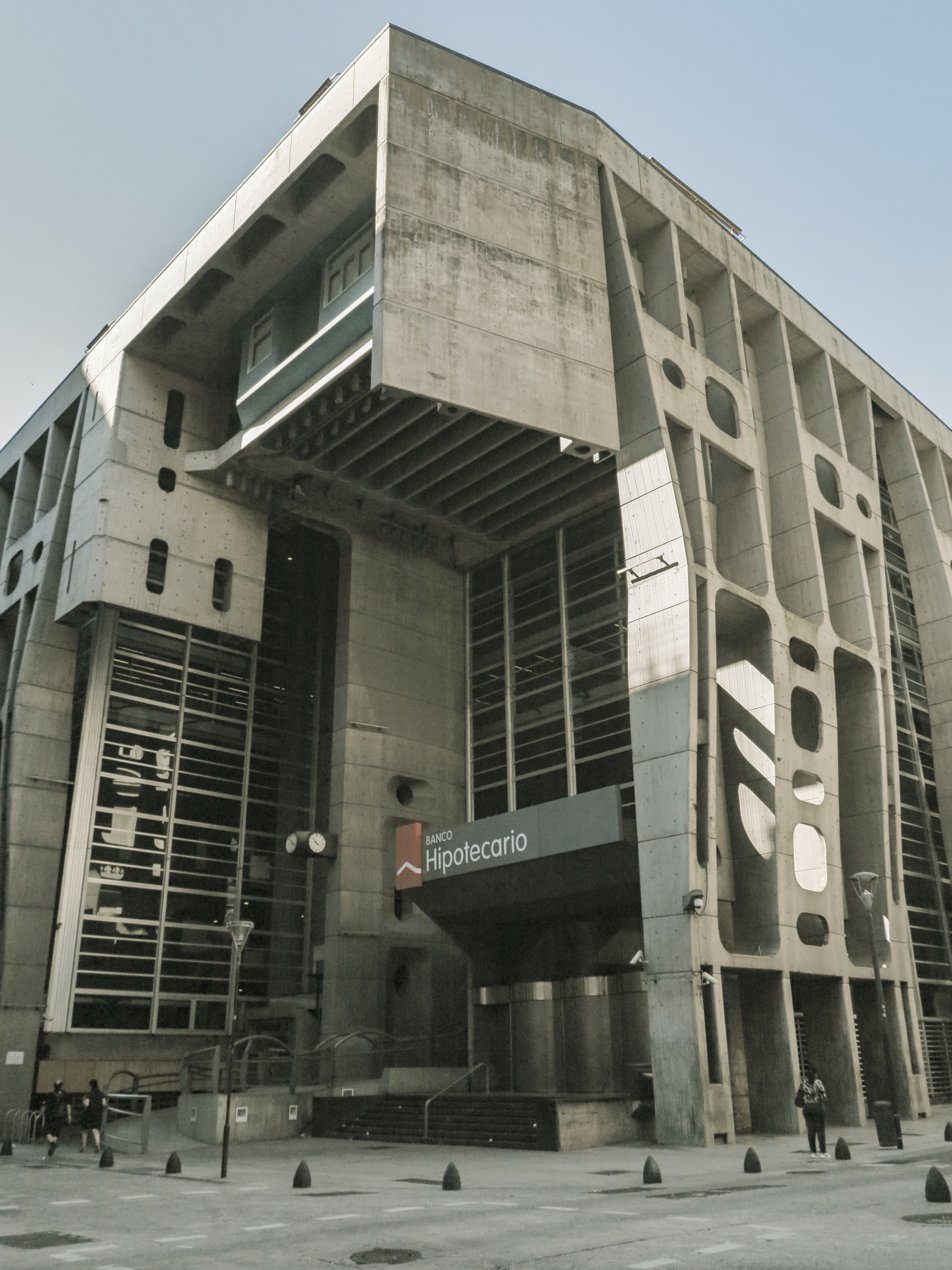
- Banco Hipotecario headquarters building in Buenos Aires
- Type: Sociedad Anónima
- Traded as: BCBA:BHIP
- Industry: Financial services
- Founded: 1886; 140 years ago
- Headquarters: Buenos Aires, Argentina
- Key people: Eduardo Elsztain (Chairman); Saúl Zang (Vice president)
- Products: Retail banking Mortgages; Consumer finance Credit cards
- Revenue: ▲US$ 330 million (2011)
- Net income: ▲US$ 56 million (2011)
- Total assets: ▲US$ 2.84 billion (2011)
- Number of employees: 1,892 (2011)
- Website: hipotecario.com.ar

Banco Hipotecario S.A. (BCBA: BHIP) Banco Hipotecario (BCBA: BHIP) is a financial institution of Argentina, with majority State participation, holding the status of a corporation (sociedad anónima). It was founded in 1886, under the name Banco Hipotecario Nacional, with the initial objective of granting mortgage loans for home construction.

Its privatization and subsequent conversion into a corporation took place in 1997. Through a series of share purchase operations on the stock market, the National State regained the status of majority shareholder in 2005.

== History ==
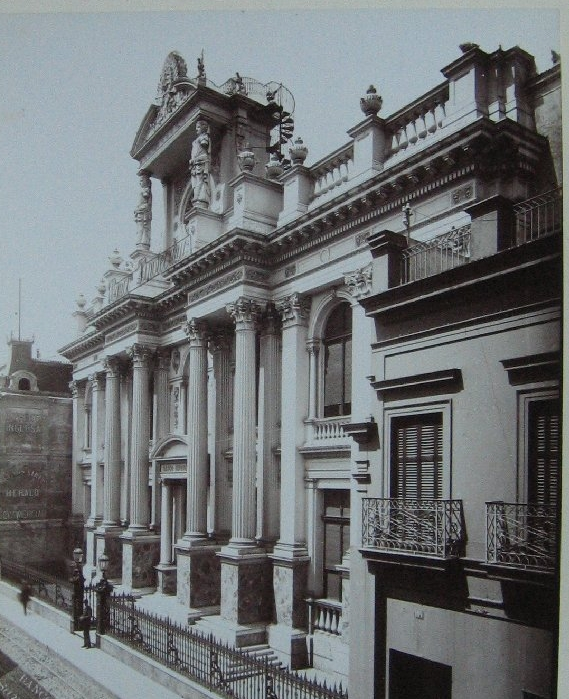
The first headquarters (today the Central Bank)

On September 24, 1886, during the presidency of Julio Argentino Roca, Law No. 1,804 was enacted, creating the Banco Hipotecario Nacional. It was assigned the essential function of granting loans for home construction with real collateral throughout the territory of the Republic, at low interest and long term, as an integral part of the process of building the Argentine State. The aim was for low-income families, who had little possibility of accessing private financing, to obtain credit suited to their income.

The bank continued to grow and, during the administration of President Hipólito Yrigoyen (1916–22), its share of the nation's mortgages doubled to 37%. The headquarters relocated in 1942 from its original, Baroque headquarters in the financial district (transferred to the Central Bank of Argentina) to a larger, Rationalist office building facing Plaza de Mayo. Between 1920 and 1945, it had granted 14,800 loans for the construction of rural and urban housing, totaling 180 million pesos. During the Five-Year Plan proposed by President Juan Perón, it went on to grant 170,000 loans totaling 570 million pesos.

Until the enactment of Circular 1050 in 1977, which allowed for the indexing of loans, a large share of its debtors benefited from successive inflationary processes that made their installments negligible, affecting the profitability of its operations.

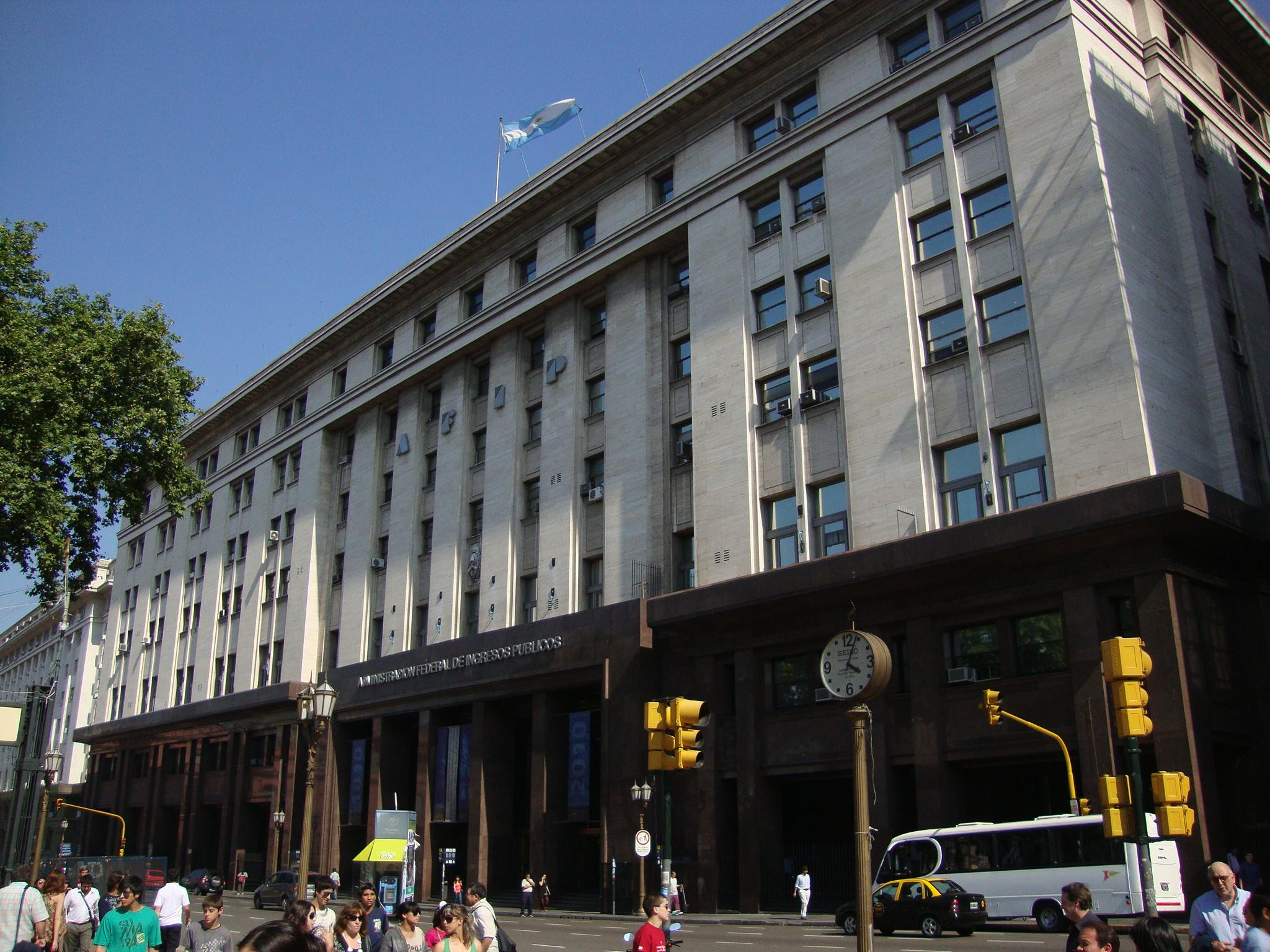
Headquarters until 1997 (today the AFIP revenue agency)

During Raúl Alfonsín’s administration, the Banco Hipotecario Nacional entered a severe financial crisis due to the discretionary granting of loans that were eroded by inflation, prompting the World Bank to recommend its closure in 1987—a proposal which the government rejected, keeping its 24 federal branches open. During the government of Raúl Alfonsín, an attempt was made to reduce losses by closing 60% of its branches, from 53 to 24.

In 1997, during the presidency of Carlos Menem, Law No. 24,855 was enacted, declaring Banco Hipotecario "subject to privatization." To this end, it was reorganized as a corporation (sociedad anónima), with all shares handed over to the National State, creating three categories of shares that could be transferred to private capital through public offering. The privatization process was challenged in court. None of these complaints resulted in a conviction. The headquarters was subsequently relocated to Clorindo Testa's Banco de Londres y América del Sur building, one of the country's best-known works of Brutalist architecture.

In 2009, Eduardo Elsztain assumed the presidency of the bank, while then-President Cristina Fernández de Kirchner appointed ANSES Director Diego Bossio to the board of directors, representing the Class "A" shares (those belonging to the National State).

As of 2026, the Argentine National State remains the majority shareholder of Banco Hipotecario, holding more than 55% of share capital in aggregate across its various holdings, distributed among different classes of shares. The Ministry of Economy is the largest individual shareholder, holding approximately 44.28% through Class A shares, along with smaller holdings in Classes C and D. The Sustainability Guarantee Fund (Fondo de Garantía de Sustentabilidad), administered by the National Social Security Administration (ANSES), holds around 4.94% of capital in Class D shares. Despite the State's majority stake, operational control and management of the bank rest with Inversiones y Representaciones Sociedad Anónima.

== Gallery ==
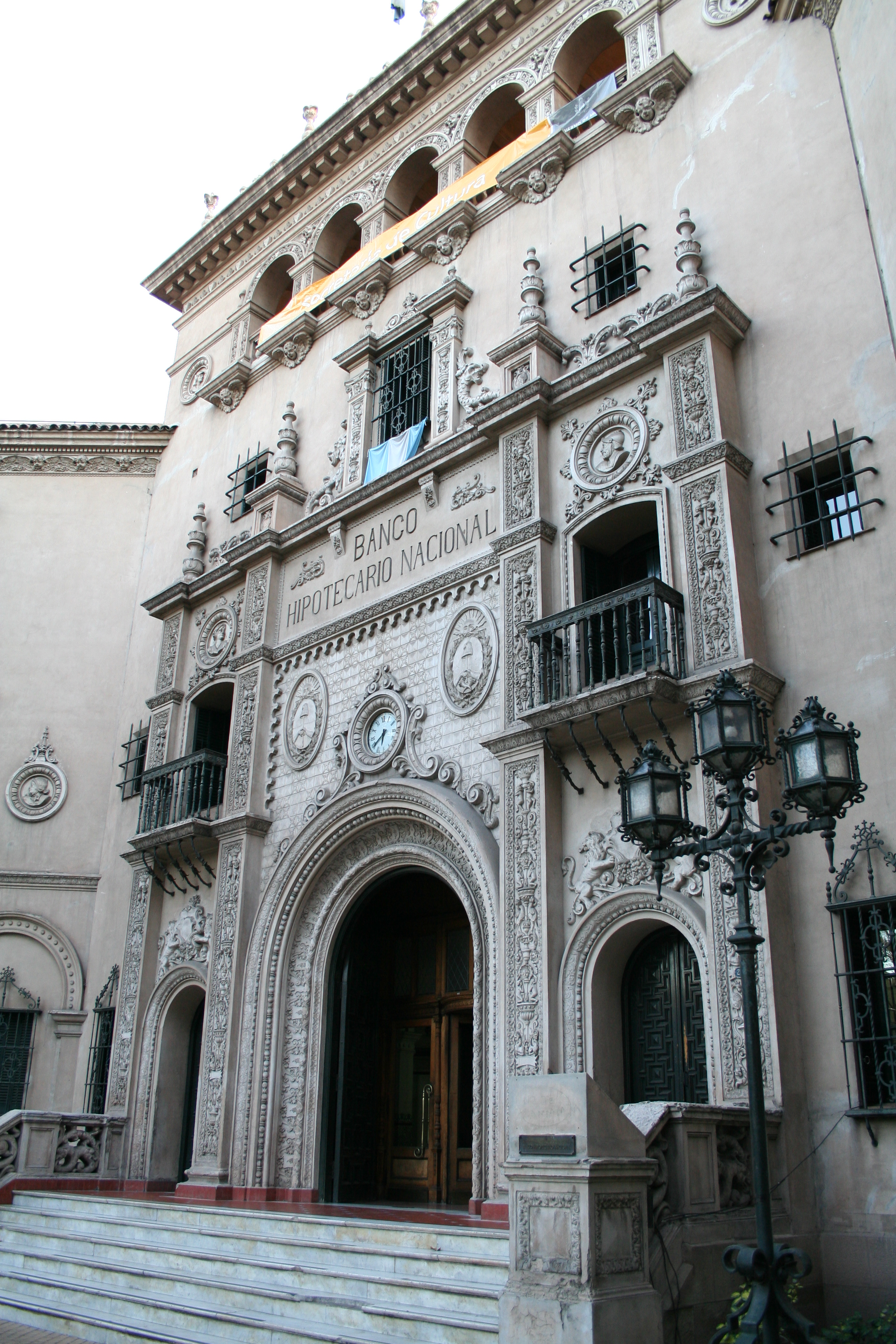
Mendoza branch

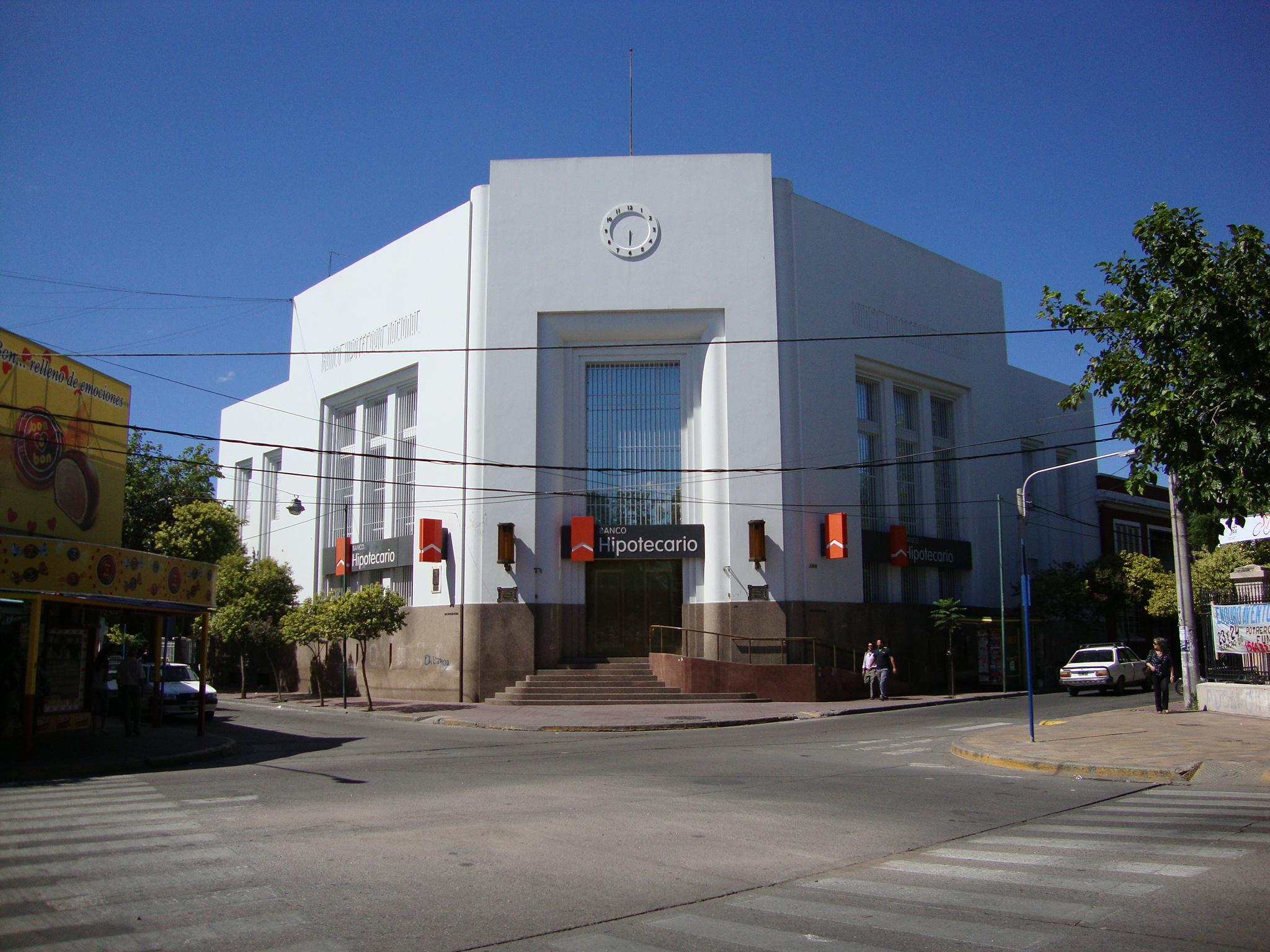
San Luis branch

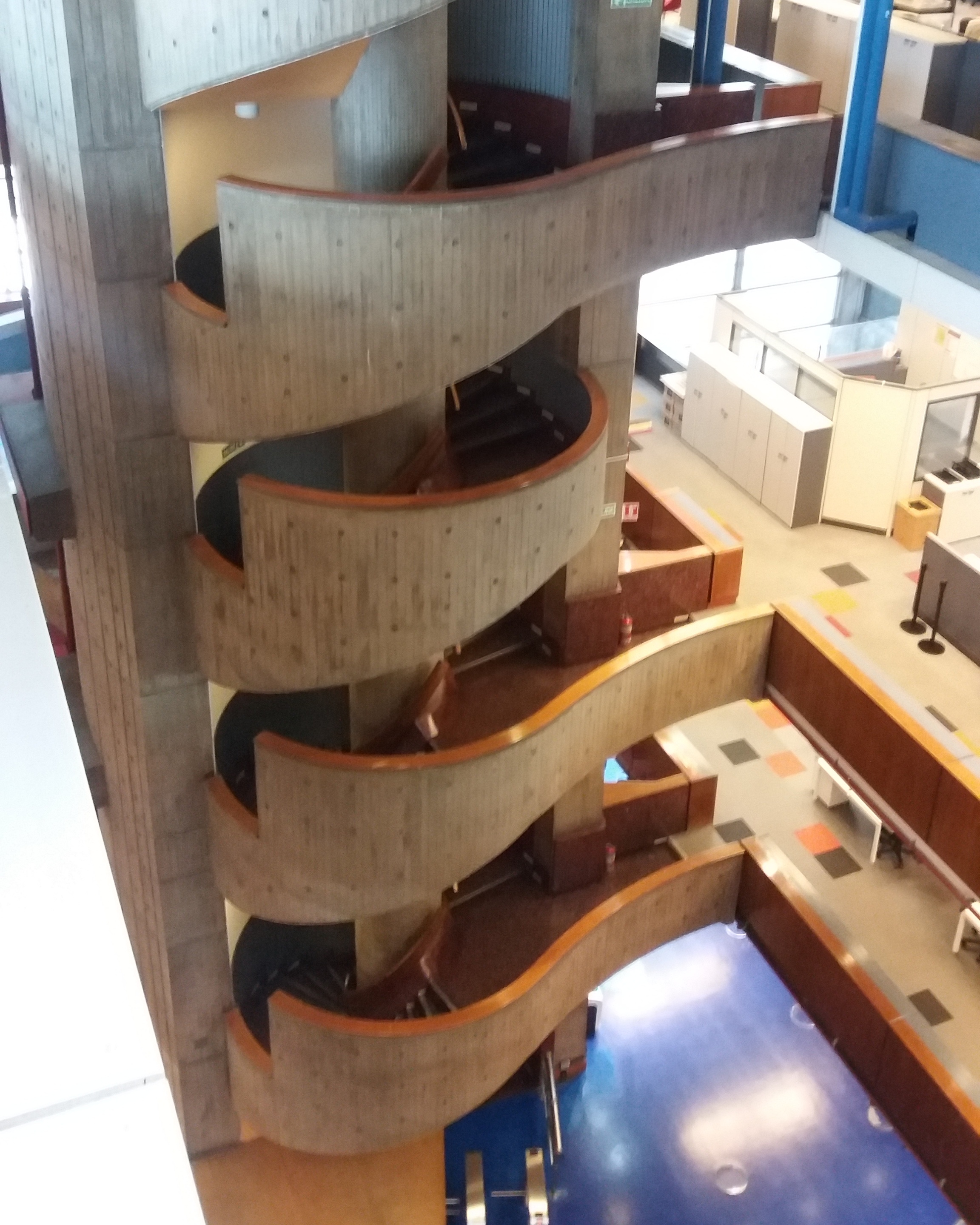
Buenos Aires branch interior

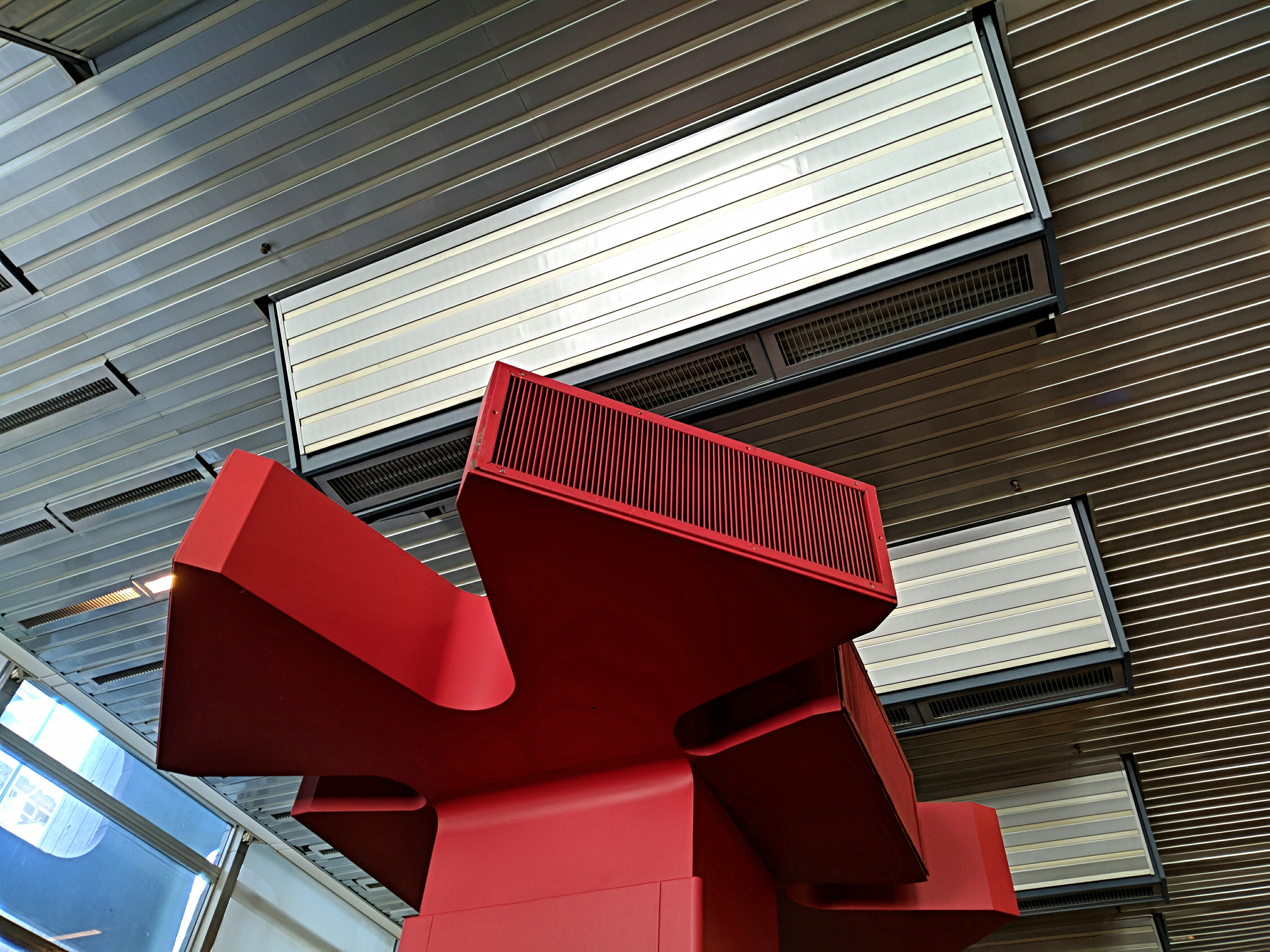
Buenos Aires branch interior

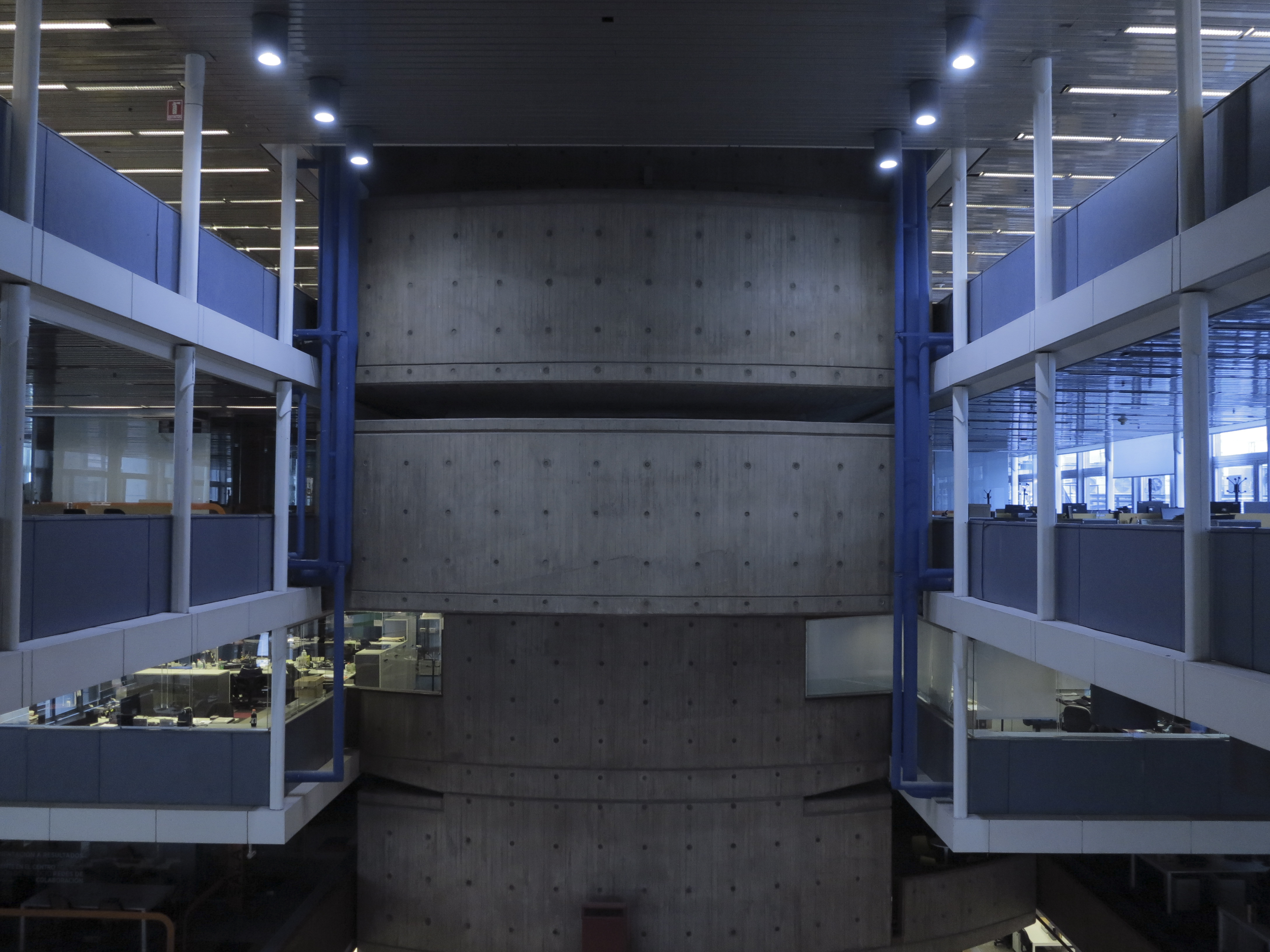
Buenos Aires branch interior

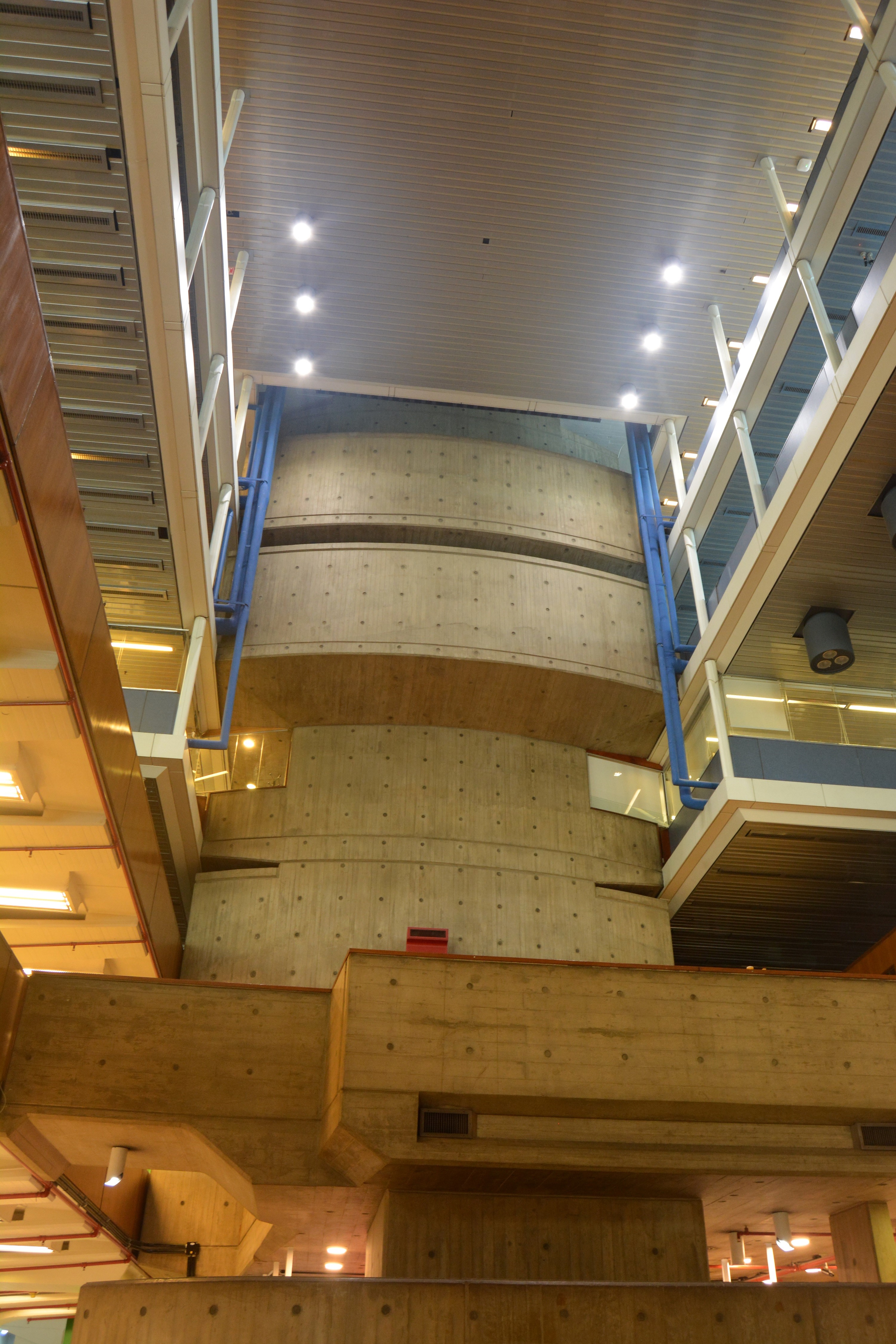
Buenos Aires branch interior

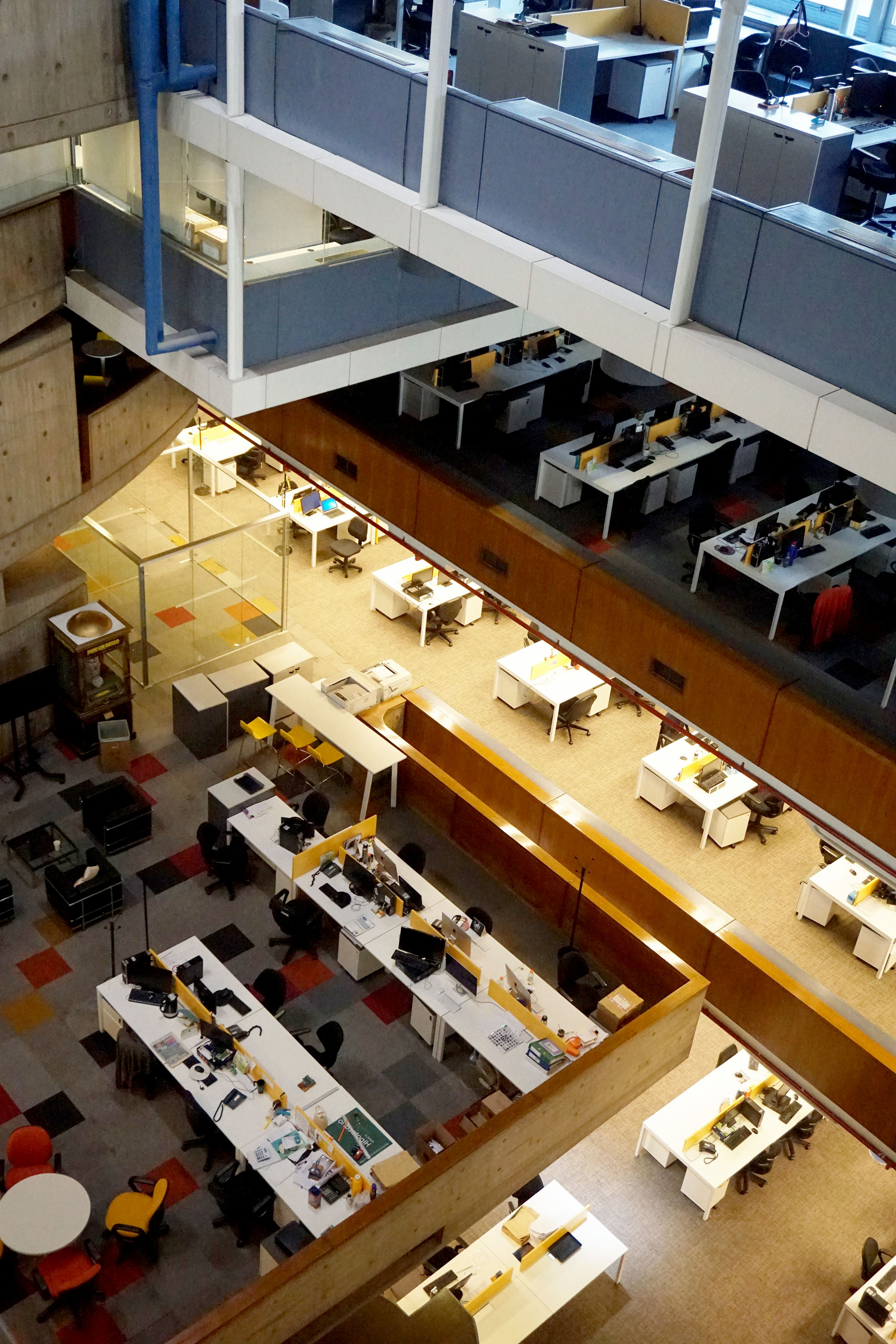
Buenos Aires branch interior

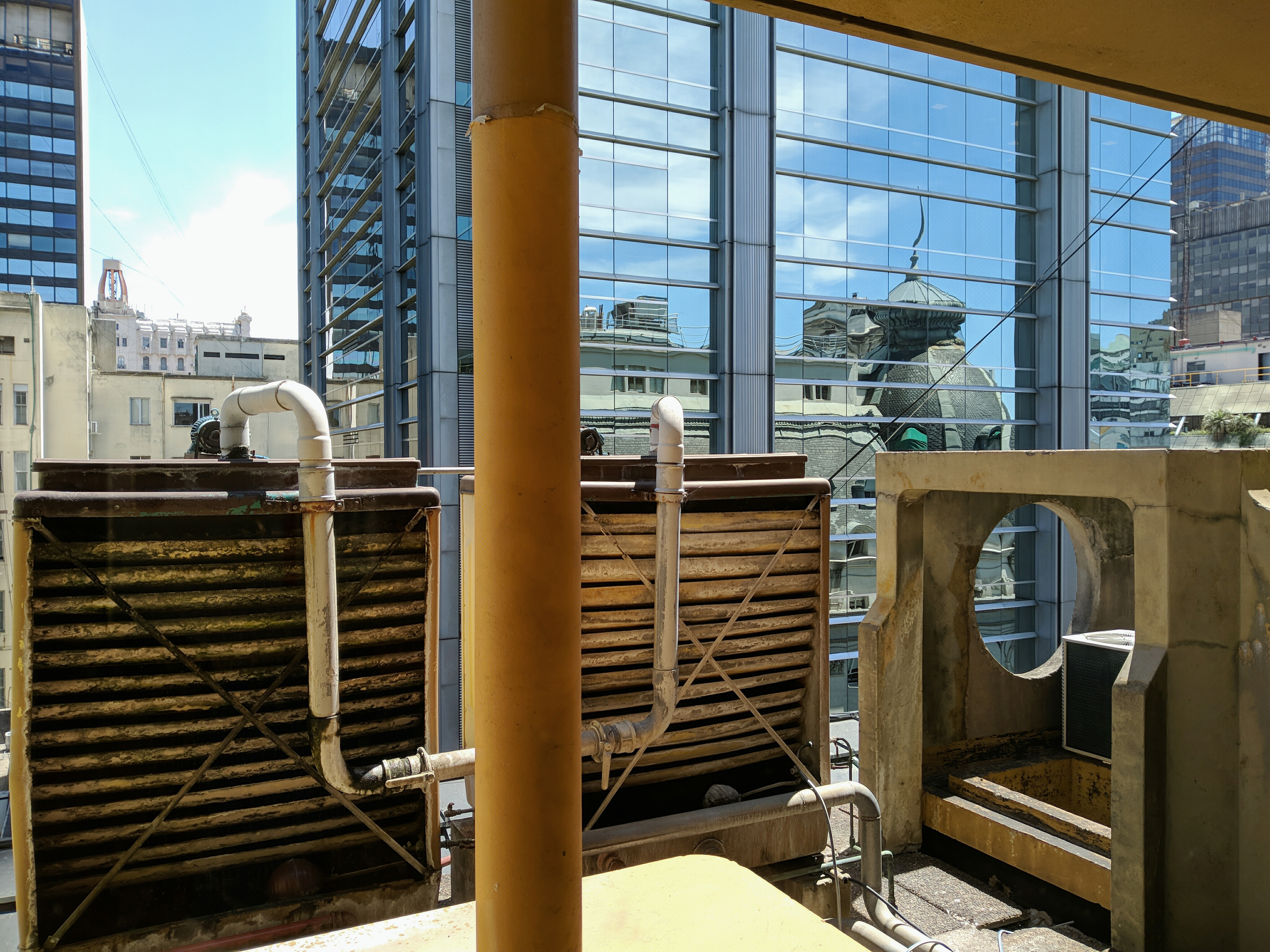
Buenos Aires branch interior
