= Instituto Tecnológico de Buenos Aires =

Argentine private university located in the city of Buenos Aires

Coordinates: 34°36′12″S 58°22′04″W

Buenos Aires Institute of Technology
- Instituto Tecnológico de Buenos Aires
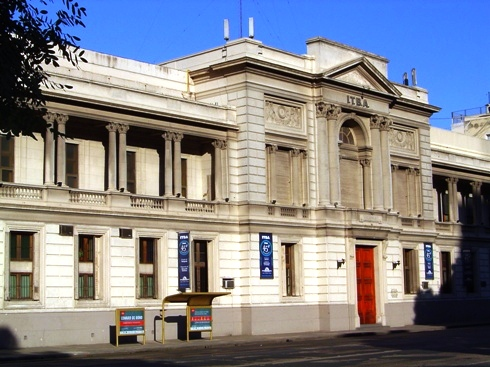
- ITBA building
- Motto: Ad Lucem Serenitate Tendo
- Motto in English: To the light peacefully I go
- Type: private
- Established: 20 November 1959; 66 years ago
- Rector: Andrés Basilio Agres
- Faculty: About 514
- Undergraduates: Above 1,650
- Location: Buenos Aires, Argentina
- Campus: Urban
- Website: itba.edu.ar
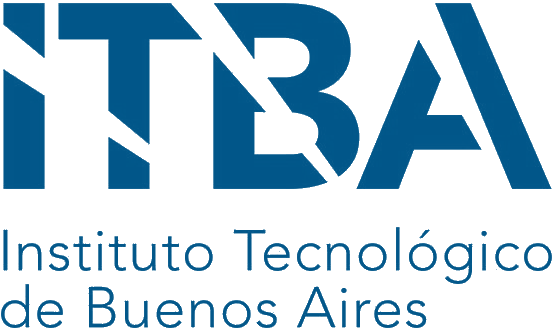

The Buenos Aires Institute of Technology (Spanish: Instituto Tecnológico de Buenos Aires, ITBA) is a private university in Buenos Aires, Argentina. Founded in 1959 by a group of Argentine Navy officers, it focuses primarily on engineering, information technology, and business studies.

== History ==
ITBA was created on 20 November 1959, by a group of Navy officers and professionals, with the purpose of advancing the teaching of engineering in Argentina. It received recognition as a private university by national Decree 12742, dated 22 October 1960. Its first rector was Vice Admiral Carlos Garzoni, followed by Leandro Maloberti, who served briefly as the Navy's Chief of Naval Operations in 1962.

The main building is located in the neighborhood of Puerto Madero, on the grounds of the old Argentine Navy Hospital. The new campus is located in the Parque Patricios neighborhood, in the city's technology district.

== Academics ==
ITBA's academic offerings center on engineering, including industrial, mechanical, computer, and chemical engineering, together with management and related disciplines.

== Ranking ==
According to the QS World University Rankings, ITBA is ranked #1201-1400 best university globally.

== Notable alumni ==
- Emilio Basavilbaso – Executive Director of the National Social Security Administration (ANSES), 2015–2019.
- Leandro Cuccioli – industrial engineer; Administrator of the Federal Administration of Public Revenues (AFIP), 2018–2019.
- Mario Dell'Acqua – president of Aerolíneas Argentinas (2016–2018).
- Miguel Galuccio – CEO of YPF (2012–2016); founder and chief executive of Vista Energy.
- Javier Iguacel – Minister of Energy (June–December 2018).
- Silvia Lospennato – National Deputy (member of Republican Proposal).
- Nicolás Posse – Chief of the Cabinet of Ministers under President Javier Milei (10 December 2023 – 27 May 2024).

== See also ==
- Aeroitba Petrel 912i
- Sabato Institute of Technology
