= Diego Bossio =

Argentine economist (born 1979)

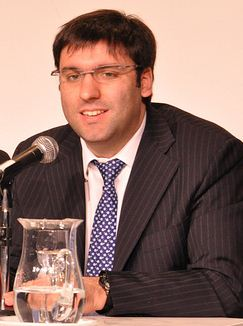

National Deputy
- In office 10 December 2015 – 10 December 2019
- Constituency: Buenos Aires

Executive Director of the National Social Security Administration
- In office July 8, 2009 – December 9, 2015
- President: Cristina Fernández de Kirchner
- Preceded by: Amado Boudou
- Succeeded by: Emilio Basavilbaso

Personal details
- Born: September 9, 1979 (age 46) Tandil, Argentina
- Party: Justicialist Party
- Spouse: Valeria Loira
- Education: University of Buenos Aires

Diego Luis Bossio (born September 9, 1979) is an Argentine economist and politician. He was executive director of ANSES, the national social insurance agency, from 2009 to 2015. Bossio also served as National Deputy for Buenos Aires Province, from 2015 to 2019.

== Early life and career ==
Bossio was born in Tandil, Buenos Aires Province. He enrolled at the University of Buenos Aires, and earned a degree in Economics in 2002. He married the former Valeria Loria, and they have one daughter. He joined the Fundación Contemporánea, a think tank, and was brought on by economist Aldo Abraham as a member of his Exante consulting firm. He later served as policy adviser to Mendoza Senator Celso Jaque. Bossio entered public service as the Secretary of Public Management, a key policy advisory position, to Jaque upon the latter's election as governor in 2007.

== Political career ==
He was appointed director of the Mendoza office of the Mortgage Bank, and on January 5, 2009, was named as the government's representative in the Board of Directors at the bank, a private-public partnership. Following a cabinet shakeup in July, Bossio succeeded the executive director of ANSES, Amado Boudou; Boudou was appointed Economy Minister. Bossio's wife had worked as an adviser to Senator Cristina Fernández de Kirchner before the latter's election as President of Argentina in 2007, and was subsequently appointed Adjunct Director of SIGEN, the federal comptroller's agency. Bossio's appointment as director of ANSES, which controls nearly a third of the national budget, prompted her resignation, however.

Bossio's tenure at ANSES coincided with a number of significant new initiatives at the social insurance bureau. He oversaw implementation of the Universal Childhood Entitlement, a program fostering vaccination and higher school enrollment among the 30% of children living in poverty; as well as Conectar Igualdad, which purchased 3 million netbooks for secondary school students and teachers; and an initiative announced in April 2011 to include ANSES members in the Board of Directors of all 42 companies on the Buenos Aires Stock Exchange in which it holds a significant stake. Directors from the 15 companies affected (27 already had an ANSES board member) varied in their reaction to the initiative, from Banco Macro (which accepted the move), to Siderar (which entered into litigation with ANSES).

Bossio was investigated for non-compliance with judicial rulings that ordered pension benefit adjustments. In one of these cases, initiated in 2007, he was charged for failing to comply with a ruling in favor of retiree Ruth Marianne Sandsted. Judge Ariel Lijo initially dismissed the charges, but the Federal Chamber revoked the dismissal, deeming it premature and ordering the investigation to continue.

During his tenure as executive director of ANSES, Bossio was investigated for his role in the irregular hiring of three sons of Kirchnerist leader Luis D'Elía: Pablo Emanuel, Facundo Nahuel, and Luis Ignacio. All three had entered ANSES without meeting one of the necessary requirements: having completed secondary education.The case was initially dismissed by Judge María Romilda Servini, then reopened by decision of the Federal Chamber, and finally Servini ordered the prosecution of D'Elía's sons for abuse of authority and violation of public official duties. Bossio had signed a resolution to appoint one of the sons, while former Labor Minister Carlos Tomada did the same for the other two appointments. Both were questioned and dismissed by Servini.The judge justified Bossio's dismissal by invoking the principle of trust, arguing that the appointment file had passed through the line of ANSES officials responsible for verifying legality. In June 2019, prosecutor Javier De Luca before the Federal Criminal Cassation Chamber withdrew an appeal filed by prosecutor Germán Moldes, thus finalizing Bossio's definitive dismissal.

In 2014, leaders of the Broad Front UNEN, headed by Elisa Carrió, filed criminal charges against him for "abuse of authority and violation of public officials' duties" for the alleged "deliberate non-compliance" with final rulings in retirees' lawsuits.

In 2015, Judge Lijo opened an investigation into Bossio for alleged illicit enrichment, following a complaint by prosecutor Pollicita. The case questioned a 13% increase in his assets and noted that Bossio was a state representative director at Banco Hipotecario, the same institution to which he owed a mortgage loan.

In February 2016, Bossio was one of the main drivers of the fracture of the Front for Victory bloc in the Argentine Chamber of Deputies. Fourteen deputies broke away from Kirchnerist leadership to form a new group called "Justicialist Bloc," which was born with 17 legislators. The move, promoted along with Juan Manuel Urtubey, caused the FpV to lose its status as the largest minority bloc.

The decision generated strong criticism from Kirchnerism. National Deputy María Teresa García publicly called him a "traitor," stating: "I find it very strange because he has been part of many inclusion policies." Meanwhile, Deputy Juliana Di Tullio wrote on Twitter: "Martín Insauralde decided not to betray the popular vote and contribute from the Municipality. Not like Diego Bossio, who made a deal with PRO to provide quorum."At the National Council of the PJ held on February 3, 2016, FpV leaders expressed disappointment with Bossio's actions, although they publicly attempted to lower the tone of the conflict. Héctor Recalde, head of the bloc, stated: "The doors are open to talk."

In January 2016, a text message exchange was leaked between Bossio and Nicolás Massot, then head of the PRO bloc in Argentine National Congress, during the debate on the agreement with vulture funds. In the chat, Massot explained to Bossio the terms of the negotiation: "We limited the debt to what is necessary to close the agreements and ensure that subsequent debt is for public works." The dialogue included phrases such as "They are softer than you" referring to Renewal Front deputies, to which Bossio replied "Yes." Massot added: "They want to dignify us. You want to drain us."This episode, dubbed "sandwichgate", generated accusations that Bossio had negotiated his vote for minor favors. In 2023, the mayor of Quilmes, Mayra Mendoza, publicly reminded him that he had voted "to pay the vulture funds for 6 sandwiches and 4 cold mates," calling him "unworthy."

== Electoral history ==
Electoral history of Diego Bossio
Election	Office	List	#	District	Votes			Result	Ref.
Election	Office	List	#	District	Total	%	P.	Result	Ref.
2017	National Deputy	Front for Victory	3	Buenos Aires Province	3,354,619	37.28%	1st (Note: Presented on an electoral list. The data shown represents the share of the vote the entire party/alliance received in that constituency.)	Elected	
