= Fernanda Raverta =

Argentine politician

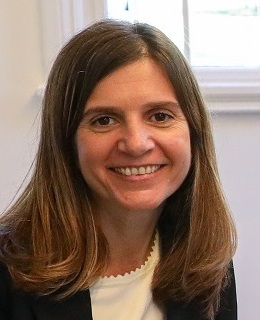

Executive Director of ANSES
- In office 30 April 2020 – 10 December 2023
- President: Alberto Fernández
- Preceded by: Alejandro Vanoli
- Succeeded by: Osvaldo Giordano

Minister of Community Development of Buenos Aires Province
- In office 11 December 2019 – 30 April 2020
- Governor: Axel Kicillof
- Preceded by: Santiago López Medrano (as Minister of Social Development)
- Succeeded by: Andrés Larroque

National Deputy
- In office 10 December 2015 – 10 December 2019
- Constituency: Buenos Aires Province

Provincial Deputy of Buenos Aires
- In office 10 December 2011 – 10 December 2015
- Constituency: Fifth Electoral Section

Personal details
- Born: 25 November 1976 (age 49) Buenos Aires, Argentina
- Party: Justicialist Party
- Education: National University of Mar del Plata

María Fernanda Raverta (born 25 November 1976) is an Argentine politician. She was, until 2023, the Executive Director of ANSES, appointed by President Alberto Fernández. She previously was Community Development of Buenos Aires Province.

The daughter of the Montoneros militants Mario Montoto and María Inés Raverta (disappeared), Raverta was the founder of H.I.J.O.S. Regional Mar del Plata. She was a provincial deputy for the fifth electoral section between 2011 and 2015 and a national deputy for the province of Buenos Aires between 2015 and 2019. She also held the position of deputy secretary of the Provincial Council of the Justicialist Party. In 2019, she ran as a candidate for mayor of General Pueyrredón district for the Frente de Todos coalition, in the PASO she became the winner but in the general elections she was defeated by the Juntos por el Cambio candidate, Guillermo Montenegro. On 30 April 2020, she was appointed by President Fernández as director of the National Social Security Administration.

== Early life ==
Fernanda Raverta was born in Buenos Aires on 25 November 1976. Her mother was María Inés Raverta, a member of Montoneros who was 24 years old, and was abducted by the Argentine Army and held in Lima, Peru, as part of an operation to try to capture the Montonero leader Roberto Perdia; who was then in the Peruvian capital. María Inés was never seen again, and continues to be regarded as one of the “disappeared." Between 1980 and 1982, Raverta lived in Cuba, where she spent her childhood in exile. In the mid-1980s, her father began a relationship with fellow Montonero Adela Segarra, and Fernanda lived with her for many years, even after Segarra left her father.

At the Colegio Nacional 2 in Mar del Plata, Raverta began to participate in the Student Center and in the FES (Federation of Secondary Students). Already at the National University of Mar del Plata, she participated in student struggles to resist the implementation of the Higher Education Law (Law No. 24,521) during the government of Carlos Menem. In 1995, she founded HIJOS Regional Mar del Plata, from where she supported the Memory, Truth and Justice movement together with the Mothers and Grandmothers of the Plaza de Mayo. Raverta graduated from the Bachelor of Social Work at the National University of Mar del Plata.

Raverta worked on issues related to social issues and vulnerable childhood; she was part of technical, professional and interdisciplinary teams. She had a career in the Mar del Plata Departmental Minors Delegation; in the Secretary of Social Development of the neighbouring General Alvarado Partido; "Chescotta" Containment Center, Undersecretary of Minority of the Ministry of Human Development of the province of Bs. As; Socio-educational Institute of Mar del Plata, Undersecretary of Children and Adolescents of the Ministry of Social Development of the Province of Buenos Aires Region V Delegation, Undersecretary of Operational Coordination, Ministry of Social Development of the Province of Buenos Aires. In 2010, Raverta was appointed to the position of Head of UDAI Puerto Mar del Plata, National Administration of Social Security (ANSES).

== Political career ==
=== Provincial deputy (2011–2015) ===
Raverta began her political life early and in the last years she was a member of La Cámpora.

She was head of the Comprehensive Care Unit (UDAI) of the Anses in Puerto Mar del Plata, in 2010. But before reaching the public function, she held two legislative seats, one as a Buenos Aires deputy, between 2011 and 2015 and during which She was president of the Culture and Human Rights commissions. In 2011, Raverta was elected provincial deputy by the fifth electoral section for the Front for Victory, and from that bench she was a member of the Social Action and Public Health and Tourism commissions, and also focused her action on the work of SMEs and cooperatives. During her term as provincial deputy, Raverta had extensive legislative work, focusing on the area of Production, Labor, and Social Development. She was the author of Law No. 14650 for the Creation of the Regime for the Promotion and Development of the Social and Solidarity Economy and the project for Youth Employment, Provincial Regime for the Promotion of Youth Employment (Expt. 917/14-15). Raverta was vice president of the Culture Commission (2012–2013) and president of the Human Rights Commission of the Honorable Chamber of Deputies of the province of Buenos Aires. As a candidate for mayor of General Pueyrredón, last year she achieved an epic : lost by less than 10,000 votes and was the narrowest margin of difference between two applicants since 1983.

=== National deputy (2015–2019) ===
In 2015, Raverta was elected national deputy for the province of Buenos Aires representing the Front for Victory. During her tenure, she was an active opponent of the government of Mauricio Macri. She was a member of the Social Action and Public Health, Tourism commissions – in both she held the position of Secretary – and also Culture, Sports, Human Rights and Maritime Guarantees and Interests. She is part of the Parliamentary Group of Friendship with the Italian Republic and of the Parliamentary Group of Friendship with the United Mexican States.

Raverta is characterized by defending the work of SMEs and cooperatives. She also worked on projects related to tourism and the Port. In 2017, Raverta presented the bill on thrombophilia, which is the product of the work of the Collective for the Thrombophilia Law, a group that fights for a law that guarantees early diagnosis and the timely treatment necessary to achieve a full-term pregnancy has the support of actresses such as Florencia Peña, Laura Franco "Panam", Romina Pereiro. In 2018, Raverta presented the project known as the National Law of Pharmacies that seeks to recover the spirit of article 14 of the original regulation, which was repealed by the decree of economic deregulation of the former Minister of Economy Domingo Cavallo in the 1990s, which established who could install pharmacies.

=== Minister of Community Development and Executive Director of ANSES (2019–2023) ===
In December 2019, Raverta was appointed Minister of Community Development of Buenos Aires Province by Governor Axel Kicillof. On 30 April 2020, she was appointed by President Alberto Fernández as executive director of ANSES. Her appointment was backed by Vice President Cristina Fernández de Kirchner. The ANSES, which is responsible for the public pensions system (pay as you go) has traditionally been used by many administrations as a source of funding for subsidies, and political propaganda, instead of securing the retirement promise.

== Personal life ==
Raverta has two daughters as a result of her relationship with Pablo Obeid (whom she appointed as Regional Director of ANSES Mar del Plata), a sister named Ana María Montoto Raverta (Ani), who is a pediatrician, and two other siblings as a result of her father's last marriage.
