= Stabilization fund =

Central bank mechanism

A stabilization fund is a mechanism set up by a government or central bank to insulate the domestic economy from large influxes of revenue, as from commodities such as oil. A primary motivation is maintaining a steady level of government revenue in the face of major commodity price fluctuations (hence the term "stabilization"), as well as the avoidance of inflation and associated atrophy of other domestic sectors (Dutch disease). This generally involves the purchase of foreign denominated debt, especially if the goal is to prevent overheating in the domestic economy. The notion may overlap with sovereign wealth fund.

Examples of such funds include:

- Stabilization Fund of the Russian Federation
- Petroleum Fund of Norway (SPF)
- Chile's Copper Stabilization Fund (CSF)
- Oman's State General Reserve Fund (SGRF)
- Kuwait's Reserve Fund for Future Generations (RFFG)
- Papua New Guinea's Mineral Resources Stabilization Fund (MRSF)
- Venezuela's Macroeconomic Stabilization Fund (MSF)
- UAE Abu Dhabi Fund for Development
- Central Bank of Iran's Oil Stabilization Fund

Stabilization funds do not necessarily have to revolve around large commodity revenue. Such national funds might instead seek to influence currency exchange rates without affecting domestic money supply. Such examples include:

- European Financial Stability Facility
- United Kingdom's Exchange Equalisation Account
- United States's Exchange Stabilization Fund

== See also ==
- Rainy day fund
- Sovereign wealth fund
