= Globant =

Argentine IT company

Globant S.A.
- Company type: Public
- Traded as: NYSE: GLOB; Russell 1000 component
- Industry: Software Product Development
- Founded: 2003; 23 years ago
- Headquarters: Luxembourg City, Luxembourg
- Key people: Martín Migoya, CEO and Co-Founder; Guibert Englebienne, Co-founder, President of Latam and Globant X Diego Tartara, Global Chief Technology Officer; Martín Umaran, Co-Founder, Chief Corporate Development Officer and President EMEA; Néstor Nocetti, Co-Founder, Chief Corporate Affairs Officer; Juan Urthiague, Chief Financial Officer; Wanda Weigert, Chief Marketing Officer; Sebastián Arriada, Chief Information Officer; Santos Videla, Chief People and Education Officer
- Products: Software Development; Infrastructure Management; Mobile application development Social Networks Development; Mainframe Migration
- Revenue: ▲US$2.455 billion (2025)
- Number of employees: 28,773 (2025)
- Website: globant.com

Globant is an IT and software development company operating internationally. It was formed in 2003 by Martín Migoya, Guibert Englebienne, Martín Umaran and Néstor Nocetti. It was founded in Buenos Aires, but later headquartered in Luxembourg. In the fourth quarter of 2025, Globant's geographic revenue breakdown was 53.8% from North America, 21.1% from Latin America, 19.3% from Europe and 5.8% from New Markets.

== History ==
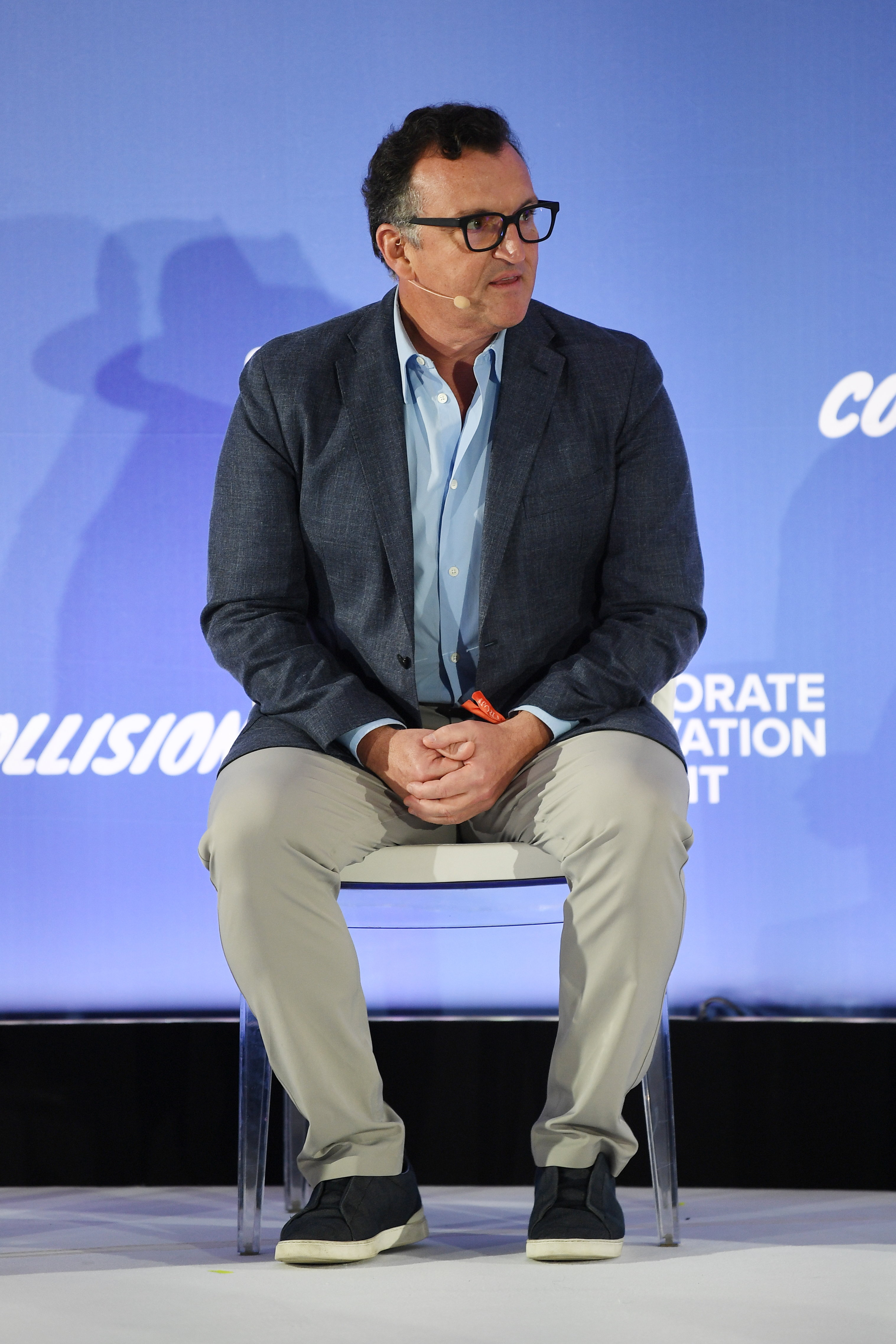
Martin Migoya, CEO of Globant in 2022

In 2003, Globant started operations with four founders. By 2008 its turnover was $40m per annum. IDC pointed Globant as one of the growing companies in Latin America. In the same year, Globant acquired Accendra, an Argentine software company with 100 employees, adding operations in Chile and Colombia. In December 2008, Globant closed its third financing round of US$13MM with Riverwood Capital and FTV Capital. It also acquired Openware, an Argentine company specialized in Security & Infrastructure Management.

In 2011, Globant acquired San Francisco-based Nextive, a company specializing in the development of mobile applications and Globant's story with Google was showcased by Bloomberg. In 2012, Globant acquired Brazil-based TerraForum, a company specialized in Innovation and Knowledge Management Consulting, Digital Marketing & Social Media and Software Development.

In 2013, WPP acquired a minority stake in Globant. Globant also acquired 86.25% of Huddle Group, a software company with operations in United States, Argentina and Chile. In 2014, the company was listed on the New York Stock Exchange. Globant was tohave made a Google Play-like dedicated hardware store for Project Ara but it was cancelled the following year. In 2015, Globant acquired Clarice Technologies and expanded its presence in Asia.

In 2017, Globant acquired PointSource, a design and development tech agency specialized in providing digital transformation services across retail, supply chain and insurance industries. Globant acquired another company, Ratio, a leading digital services company specialized on video streaming services.

In 2019, Certified Collectibles Group, a collectibles company in Sarasota, Florida, filed a lawsuit in federal court against Globant. The lawsuit is seeking tens of millions of dollars in damages caused by Globant's alleged misconduct in regards to the creation of a new operating system for the collectibles company. In the same year, Globant acquired Belatrix Software, a product development company. In the same year Globant began an annual "Women that Build" awards to reward "game-changing women in the STEAM industries".

In January 2020, Globant acquires BiLive (Argentina). Later in the year, Globant acquired grupoAssa (Argentina), Xappia, Giant Monkey Robot "GMR" and BlueCap (Spain) companies. In 2021, Globant acquired CloudShift (United Kingdom). Habitant, a European consulting firm, the Spanish firm Walmeric and in October, it opened its development center in San Jose, Costa Rica. In May 2023, Globant acquired Pentalog, a digital transformation services company.

Since early 2024, Globant has sponsored Franco Colapinto in his transition to Formula 2, and starting in August, in his entry into Formula 1.

== Recognition ==
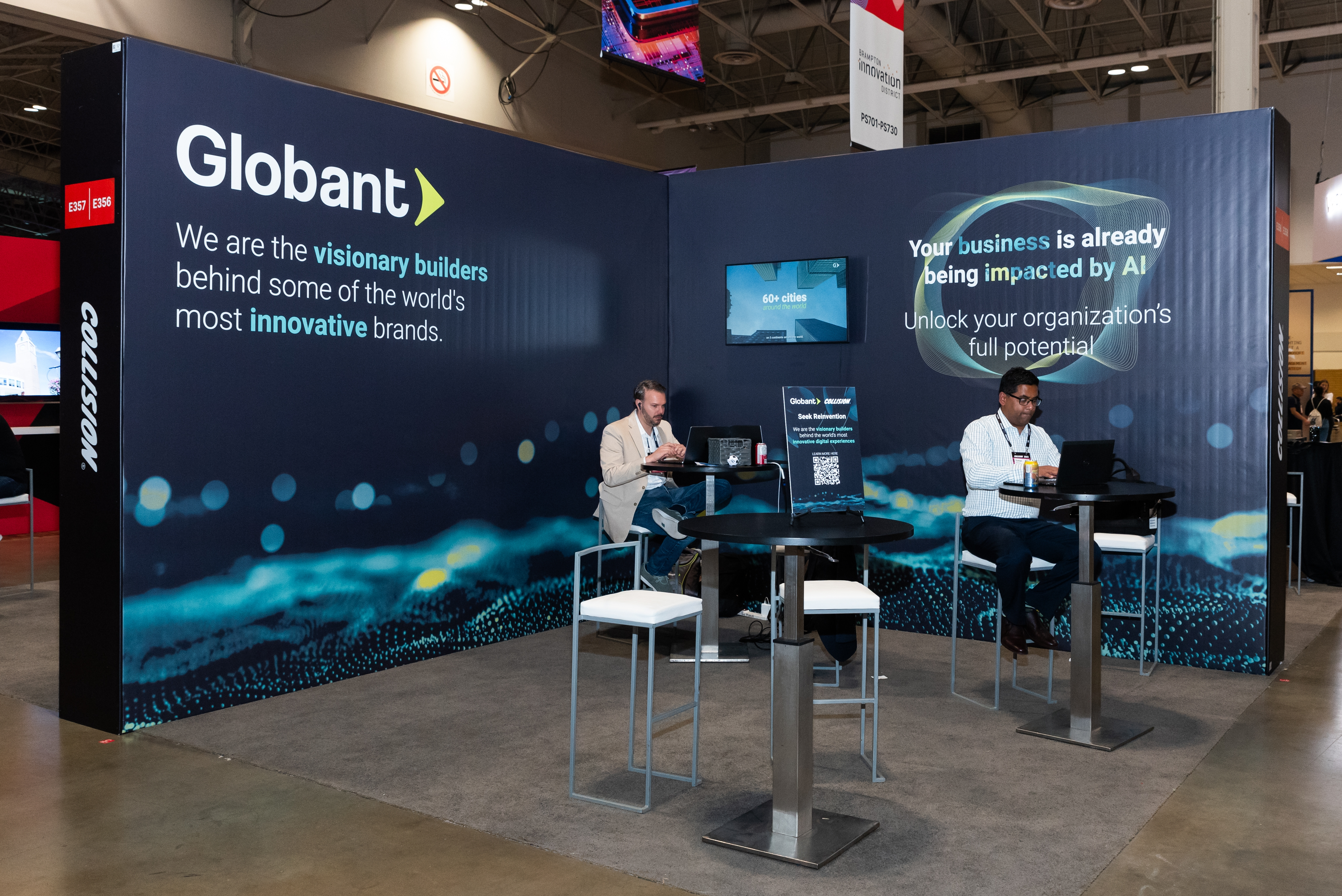
At "Collision 2023" in Toronto

In 2005, Globant was named Endeavor Entrepreneur 2005 was recognized as the Best Services Exporter by Export.ar. The Sloan School of Management of the MIT wrote a case about Globant called: "Leading the IT Revolution in Latin America".

In 2007, Globant was recognized as the Top Emerging Global Services Provider, by Global Services Magazine.

In 2010. Globant was awarded with the AlwaysON 250 award for creating technology innovations for the Global Silicon Valley, in the Cloud and Infrastructure Category. It was also named Cool Vendor by Gartner, in the Cool Vendors in Business Process Services 2010 report by Gartner, Inc.

In 2014, FastCompany featured Globant as one of the world's top 10 most innovative companies in South America.

== Revenue and headcount ==
Year	Revenue ($)	Headcount
2010	57 million	1,700
2011	90 million	2,250
2012	129 million	2,700
2013	158 million	3,300
2014	199.6 million	3,775
2015	258.3 million	5,041
2016	322.9 million	5,855
2017	413.4 million	6,753
2018	522.3 million	8,384
2019	659.3 million	11,855
2020	814.1 million	16,251
2021	1,297.1 million	23,526
2022	1,780.2 million	27,122
2023	2,095.9 million	29,150
2024	2,415.7 million	31,280
2025	2,454.9 million	28,773
