= Jesús Rodríguez (Argentine politician) =

Argentine politician

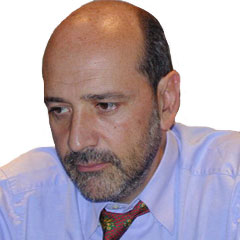

President of the Auditoría General de la Nación
- In office 3 March 2020 – 12 December 2023
- Preceded by: Oscar Lamberto
- Succeeded by: Juan Manuel Olmos

National deputy
- In office 10 December 1999 – 10 December 2003
- Constituency: City of Buenos Aires
- In office 10 December 1993 – 10 December 1997
- Constituency: City of Buenos Aires
- In office 10 December 1983 – 10 December 1991
- Constituency: City of Buenos Aires

Minister of Economy
- In office 1989–1989
- President: Raúl Alfonsín
- Preceded by: Juan Carlos Pugliese
- Succeeded by: Miguel Ángel Roig

Personal details
- Born: 16 June 1955 (age 71) Quilmes, Argentina
- Party: Radical Civic Union
- Education: Faculty of Economic Sciences (UBA)
- Website: https://www.jesusrodriguez.com.ar/

Jesus Rodríguez (born 16 June 1955) is a politician from Argentina, from the Radical Civic Union (UCR).

== Biography ==
Jesús Rodríguez was born in Quilmes. He was elected to the Chamber of Deputies at the age of 28 for the 1983-1987 period. He was reelected for the 1987-1991 period, and elected again for 1993-1997. He was also elected for the 1994 amendment of the Constitution of Argentina.

He was appointed minister of economy of Raúl Alfonsín in 1989, amid a hyperinflation crisis, and stayed until the end of Alfonsín term.

As the leading opposition party, the UCR selected him to lead the Auditoría General de la Nación (AGN) in 2020 and up to 2023, during the presidency of Peronist Alberto Fernández. Although both the UCR and Republican Proposal (Propuesta Republicana, PR) have 60 legislators each, the UCR prevailed because the PR had legislators who were elected under other tickets. The AGN made a report in 2023 against a IMF credit taken by the presidency of Mauricio Macri during the 2018 Argentine monetary crisis. Rodríguez, who was in the minority despite being the president of the AGN, clarified that the report was not officially endorsed by the AGN. He also pointed that the report rejects the credit for not being approved by a law, although no law required to do that, nor previous similar credits had been approved in such way.
