= Silvina Batakis =

Argentine politician

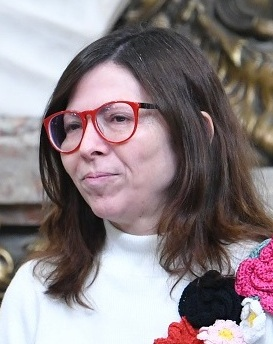

Minister of Habitat and Urban Development of Buenos Aires Province
- Incumbent
- Assumed office 13 December 2023
- Governor: Axel Kicillof

President of the Banco de la Nación Argentina
- In office 5 August 2022 – 10 December 2023
- President: Alberto Fernández
- Preceded by: Eduardo Hecker
- Succeeded by: Daniel Tillard

Minister of Economy
- In office 4 July 2022 – 3 August 2022
- President: Alberto Fernández
- Preceded by: Martín Guzmán
- Succeeded by: Sergio Massa

Secretary of Provinces
- In office 27 December 2019 – 4 July 2022
- President: Alberto Fernández
- Preceded by: Alejandro Caldarelli
- Succeeded by: Bruno Ruggeri

Minister of Economy of Buenos Aires Province
- In office 10 December 2011 – 10 December 2015
- Governor: Daniel Scioli
- Preceded by: Alejandro Gaspar Arlía
- Succeeded by: Hernán Lacunza

Personal details
- Born: 27 December 1968 (age 57) Río Grande, Argentina
- Party: Justicialist Party
- Other political affiliations: Front for Victory (2007–2015); Frente de Todos (2019–2023); Union for the Homeland (2023-present)
- Children: 1
- Education: National University of La Plata; University of York

Silvina Aída Batakis (Spanish pronunciation: [silˈβina aˈiða βaˈtakis]; born 27 December 1968) is an Argentine economist and politician. She currently works as the Minister of Habitat and Urban Development of Buenos Aires Province. She was the President of the Banco de la Nación Argentina from 2022 to 2023, she also served as the Minister of Economy for a brief period in 2022. Previously, she served as Secretary of Provinces in the Ministry of the Interior and as economy minister of Buenos Aires Province under Governor Daniel Scioli from 2011 to 2015.

== Early life ==
Batakis was born in Río Grande, Tierra del Fuego, and grew up in Río Gallegos, Rafaela, Taco Pozo and La Plata. She graduated with a licenciatura in Economics from the National University of La Plata in 1993. Additionally, she holds a master's degree in public finances and a master's degree in environmental economy from the University of York.

== Political career ==
Starting in 1992, Batakis held a number of public offices in the government of Buenos Aires Province. In 2009, she was appointed as cabinet chief and Secretary of Finances in the provincial economy ministry under Alejandro Arlía; in 2011, Governor Daniel Scioli designated Batakis as economy minister in her own right.

As economy minister of Buenos Aires, Batakis introduced a reform in the provincial tax revenue distribution system. The reform resulted in a tax increase and lower subsidies from the provincial government in 60% of the province's districts, and the provincial government had to request an additional $2,800 million ARS in order to supply the net loss. The reform was criticised by then president Cristina Fernández de Kirchner. In 2014, Batakis introduced a 30% spike in rural and urban property tax, excluding retirees and pensioners owning properties valued under $200,000. In addition, a previously overturned inheritance tax was reintroduced.

During Scioli's 2015 presidential campaign, the then-governor announced Batakis was his pick for an eventual economy minister. Scioli lost the election against Mauricio Macri in the second round.

In 2019, Batakis was designated as Secretary of Provinces in the Ministry of the Interior by President Alberto Fernández and interior minister Eduardo de Pedro. As secretary, Batakis headed the negotiations for a new fiscal consensus in order to grant Argentina's 23 provinces further financial autonomy and judicial stability for the Argentine tax system.

The minister of economy Martín Guzmán resigned in 2022, amid an economic crisis. There were lengthy and conflictive negotiations between the factions of the Frente de Todos, which culminated in the appointment of Batakis, a vocal supporter of Cristina Kirchner's economic policies.

She resigned from her position as Minister of Economy on 28 July 2022, 24 days after she had been appointed in that position. President Alberto Fernandez designated her to become the new President of the Banco de la Nación Argentina on that same day.

She assumed her position as President of the Banco de la Nación on 5 August 2022, after being officially appointed to that position the previous day.

After leaving her position in the national government, Axel Kicillof, the governor of Buenos Aires Province, appointed her as the Minister of Habitat and Urban Development of Buenos Aires Province on 13 December 2023.

== Personal life ==
Batakis is nicknamed La Griega ("the Greek") referring to her Greek origins. She has a son.

== See also ==
- Felisa Miceli

Political offices
Preceded by Martín Guzmán	Minister of Economy; 2022	Succeeded by Sergio Massa
