= Felisa Miceli =

Argentine economist and politician

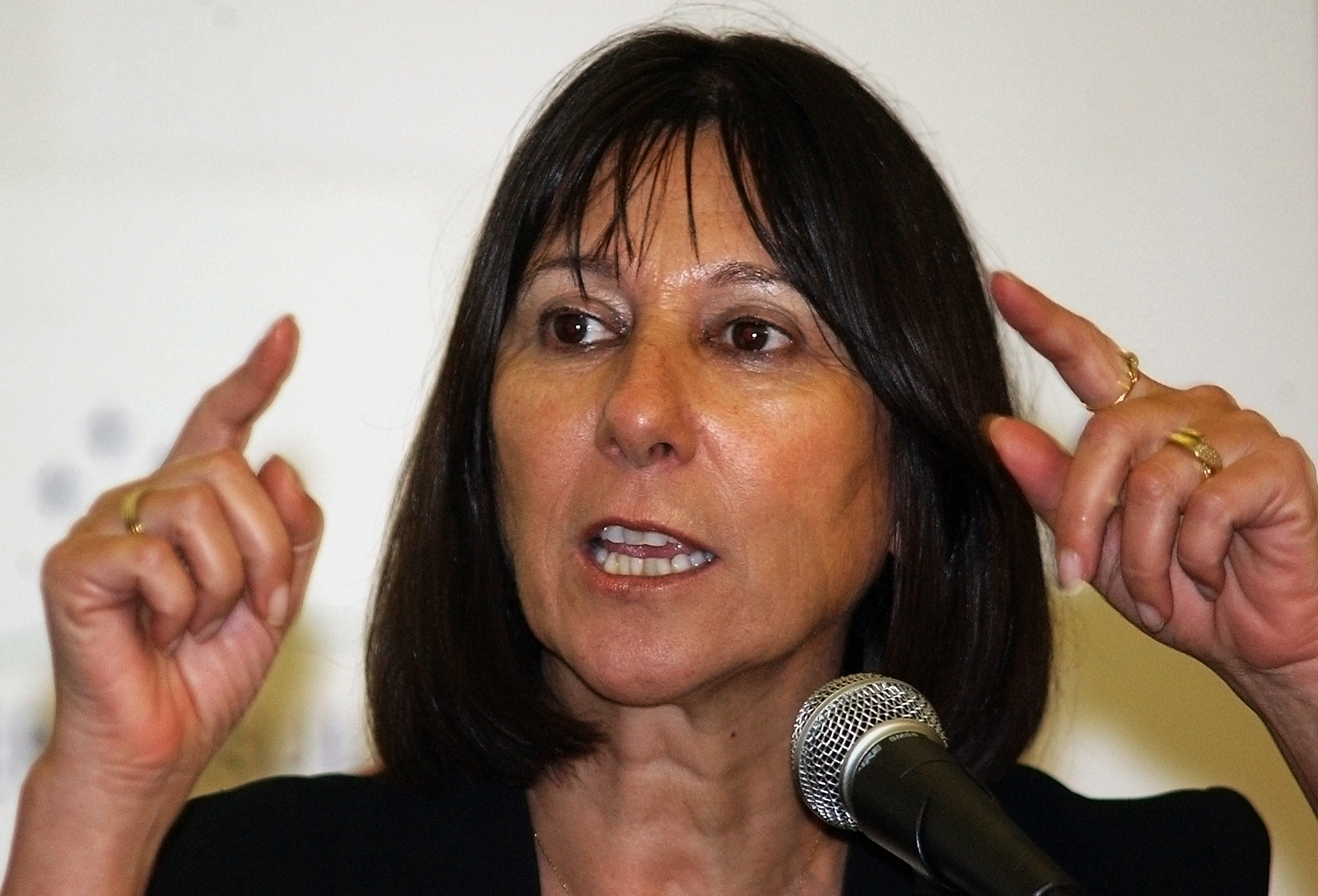

Minister of Economy of Argentina
- In office 28 January 2005 – 16 July 2007
- President: Néstor Kirchner
- Preceded by: Roberto Lavagna
- Succeeded by: Miguel Peirano

Personal details
- Born: 26 September 1952 (age 74) Carlos Casares, Buenos Aires, Argentina
- Party: Justicialist
- Spouse: Ricardo Velasco
- Education: University of Buenos Aires

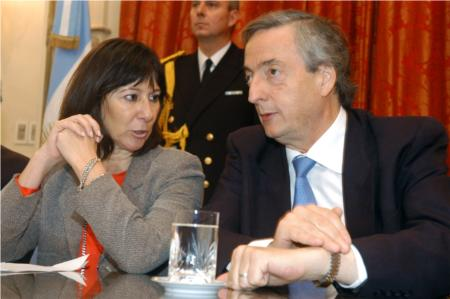
Felisa Miceli confers with President Kirchner in 2006.

Felisa Miceli (born 26 September 1952) is an Argentine economist, and a former Minister of Economy and Production of Argentina. She was appointed by President Néstor Kirchner on January 28, 2005, in place of Roberto Lavagna, and was the first woman ever to lead that ministry. She resigned to the position on July 16, 2007, as prosecutors stepped up an investigation into a bag of cash found in her ministry offices.

== Biography ==
Born in Carlos Casares, Buenos Aires Province, Miceli was a student of Lavagna's at the University of Buenos Aires. She was a left-wing activist in the 1960s, and later served as Director-Secretary of the Bank of the Province of Buenos Aires during Aldo Ferrer's tenure as bank president between 1983 and 1987. She then worked in Lavagna's consultant firm, Ecolatina, in the beginning of the 1990s. In May 2002, during the presidency of Eduardo Duhalde and at the height of the 1998–2002 Argentine great depression, she became part of Lavagna's team as a representative of the Ministry of Economy before the Central Bank. On May 30, 2003, she became the chairperson of the Banco Nación.

She was widely considered a follower of Lavagna, and the successful economic policies instituted by the former Minister were expected to continue in force, but Miceli was viewed as more progressive, as well as less independent from the President (with whom Lavagna had had disagreements). In interviews, she stated that the main goal of her administration would be improving income distribution. Argentina's economy grew by an annual 9% during 2004 and 2005, but average wages in real terms did not recover to the level before the 2002 devaluation of the Argentine peso until 2006, and income poverty, though greatly reduced, remained high by historical standards.

On the topic of inflation, which climbed to over 10% in both 2005 and 2006, Miceli said that "inflation [would be] a little higher than expected, but it's that or the peace of the graveyards" - a reference to recommendations of the IMF in favor of cutting public spending and increasing interest rates to contract the economy. Miceli also denied that increased wages were a source of inflation, attributing it instead to lack of investment to supply rising demand. Miceli expressed her intention of conducting a comprehensive tax reform, and reviewing the performance of the private retirement pension fund system, which she considered a failure. Upon her designation, the Argentine markets reacted briefly with surprise; the MerVal index of the Buenos Aires Stock Exchange fell by 4.5% and the price of the dollar rose slightly.

Minister Miceli pursued a progressive economic policy during her tenure, advocating for labor rights and income redistribution, and against globalization generally; her fiscal policy was moderate, however, and she maintained a budget surplus of 1.8% of GDP. Argentine GDP continued to grow at an 8.5% rate as it had since 2003, while current account surplus remained high at 3.5% of GDP. She also supported the debt restructuring and "disindebtment" strategy adopted by the government since the beginning of 2005, which consisted in paying the IMF in time and in full without negotiation when possible, so as to reduce the debt and gain financial independence from it; the final step in this policy was the cancellation of the remaining debt to the IMF in January 2006 with a single payment of about US$9.5 billion. Miceli worked with the Central Bank to prevent a revaluation of the peso below 3 per U.S. dollar for the sake of export competitiveness, maintaining a policy of frequent dollar purchases by the Central Bank; the Central Bank's reserves thus surpassed their pre-IMF repayment levels on September 27, 2006.

=== Scandal and resignation ===
In July 2007, Miceli was involved in a controversy for a bag containing US$31,000 and AR$100,000 which the police found in a cupboard in her office bathroom. Miceli claimed it was money lent to her by her brother as a down payment in a real estate purchase. The Argentine peso bills, however, were sealed in a special numbered wrapper issued by the Central Bank, and were traced to a financial firm that did not have records of the withdrawing of any such amount, and did not count Miceli or her brother as clients. Federal prosecutor Guillermo Marijuán demanded a hearing with Miceli.

In the midst of this scandal, the minister was forced to resign on 16 July. The First Lady and presidential candidate Senator Cristina Fernández de Kirchner stated: "We are a government that has the fight against corruption as our banner, and we cannot allow doubts in this regard." Miceli's successor, Miguel Peirano, until then the Secretary of Industry, was designated and announced on the same day.

Felisa Miceli was found guilty on December 17, 2012, and sentenced to 4 years in prison; she appealed the sentence.

Preceded by Roberto Lavagna	Minister of Economy; 2005–2007	Succeeded by Miguel Peirano
