= Maria Lucia Yanguas =

American economist

- Citizenship: Argentina

Academic background
- Education: University of California, Los Angeles; University of San Andrés

Academic work
- Discipline: Applied Microeconomics
- Institutions: University of California, Los Angeles
- Website: http://www.luciayanguas.com/

Maria Lucia Yanguas is an economics consultant at Cornerstone Research in Washington, DC. Originally from Argentina, Yanguas’ native language is Spanish. She is bilingual in English, and also has basic skills in French, Portuguese, and Italian. Her research focuses in the areas of Urban Economics, Labor Economics, Economic History, and Development Economics.

== Education and career ==
In 2010, Yanguas earned a B.S in economics, graduating summa cum laude from the Universidad de San Andrés in Argentina. Yanguas pursued an M.A. in economics at the same university, as well as completing an M.A. in economics at UCLA in 2014. Finally, she earned her Ph.D. in economics from UCLA in 2019.

Yanguas’ career in Economics began with a position as a teaching assistant at Universidad de San Andrés (UdeSA) in courses including International Economic History, Markets and Financial Intermediation, Game Theory and Strategic Behavior, and a seminar about the top 20 academic articles published in the American Economic Review. From 2012 to 2013, Yanguas worked as a research manager at the Abdul Latif Jameel Poverty Action Lab in Santiago, Chile. Beginning in 2014, Yanguas became a graduate research assistant at UCLA for one year, and then transitioned to a teaching assistant position from 2015 until 2019, earning UCLA's Department of EconomicsTeaching Assistant Award in 2018. Currently, she is working as a Cornerstone research associate in Washington, DC.

== Research and academic work ==
Maria Lucia Yanguas focuses her academic work and research on a range of Economic topics, working in the field of applied microeconomics. Much of her work is based in her home country of Argentina. She has four published papers and two working papers.

=== Economic impact of natural disasters in the United States ===
Yanguas worked with Paul Rhode, Matthew Kahn, and Leah Platt Boustan to collect data from U.S. natural disasters from 1920 to 2010 and examine their economic impacts. They find that out-migration for U.S. counties increases by 1.5% while prices for housing decreases by 2.5-5.0% for severe natural disasters. Disaster are also linked to lower productivity and labor demand at a local level. This paper was published in the Journal of Urban Economics (2020).

=== Political Coase theorem ===
Yanguas, along with Sebastian Galiani and Gustavo Torrensin, have conducted a laboratory experiment to test the political Coase theorem (PCT), an application of the Coase theorem to politics. One of the assumptions of the Coase Theorem is that agents can commit to agreements, but this may not always occur with political agents. They test the effects of commitment issues and find that they do matter in the case of political efficiency and that more commitment possibilities can lead to greater social benefit. This paper was published by the Journal of Economic Behavior & Organization (2014),

=== Other publications ===
Her other published papers include “Efficiency and Market Power in the Financial Sector: The Case of Argentina,” published in Asociación Argentina de Economía Política (2011), “Technology and Educational Choices: Evidence From a One-Laptop-per-Child Program” in the Economics of Education Review (2020)
