= Cayetano Antonio Licciardo =

Argentine politician (1923–1999)

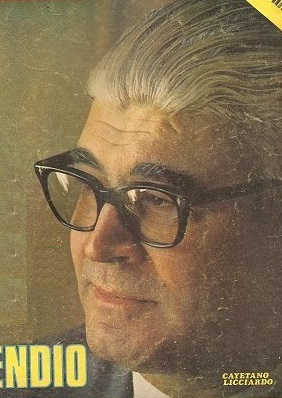

Minister of Economy
- In office 1971–1972
- Preceded by: Juan A. Quilici
- Succeeded by: Jorge Wehbe

Minister of Education of Argentina
- In office December 22, 1981 – December 1983

Personal details
- Born: July 19, 1923 Ensenada, Buenos Aires, Argentina
- Died: October 30, 1999 (aged 76) Buenos Aires, Argentina
- Occupation: Politician and economist
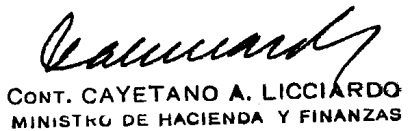
- Signature

Cayetano Antonio Licciardo (July 19, 1923– October 30, 1999) was an Argentine politician and the Minister of Economy of Argentina from 1971 to October 13, 1972, and the Minister of Education December 22, 1981 to December 1983.

== Education and career ==
Educated at Argentine Catholic University, he began as a fiscal accounting in 1947 before becoming head of Argentina's Office of Budget Accounting. He was Undersecretary of Finance from 1962 to 1963, National Director and Undersecretary of Budget from 1966 to 1968, Director of Central Bank in 1971 and also Director of the National Development Bank. In 1981, he was appointed as Minister of Economy followed by Minister of Education. He was also a professor of economics at Argentine Catholic University and also a Professor, Dean and Rector at Catholic University of La Plata, and also Professor at University of Buenos Aires, becoming Dean there in 1979, Pontifical Catholic University of Argentina and Universidad del Salvador. He was married to Delia Cabaleiro with whom he had five children.
