= Miguel Gustavo Peirano =

Argentine economist (born 1966)

Miguel Peirano
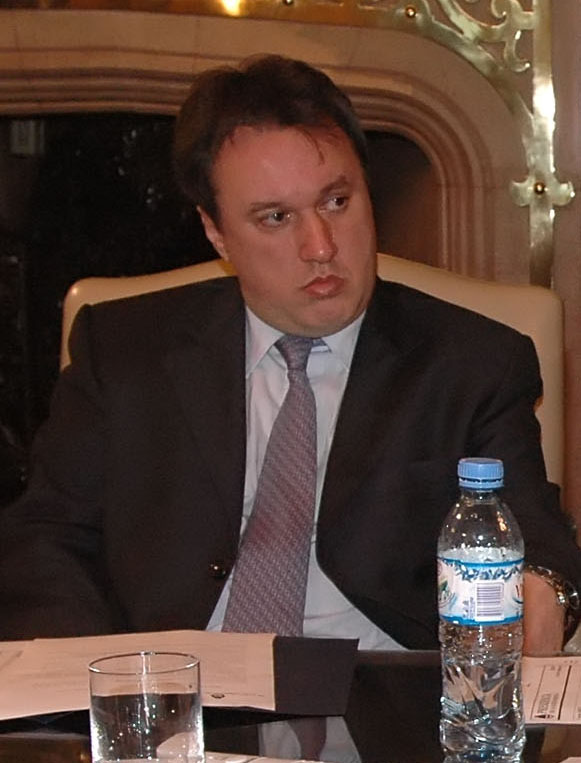

Minister of Economy of Argentina
- In office 17 July 2007 – 10 December 2007
- President: Néstor Kirchner
- Preceded by: Felisa Miceli
- Succeeded by: Martín Lousteau

Personal details
- Born: Miguel Gustavo Peirano; 1 October 1966 (age 60) Buenos Aires
- Education: University of Buenos Aires

Miguel Gustavo Peirano (born 1 October 1966) is an Argentine economist and former Minister of Economy and Production of Argentina. He was appointed by President Néstor Kirchner on July 17, 2007, in place of Felisa Miceli.

== Biography ==
Peirano was born in Buenos Aires. He graduated from the University of Buenos Aires with a degree in Economics, and began his career in 1989 as a market risk analyst at the Banco Sudameris. Peirano has worked both in the public and the private sector.

Between 1990 and 1992 he worked in the multinational Techint group. He later taught Economics at the Colegio Nacional de Buenos Aires, and served as adviser for the City of Buenos Aires General Directorate of Industry, for the Board of the Bank of the Province of Buenos Aires, and as president of the Economics department of the Buenos Aires chapter of the Argentine Industrial Union (UIA), the nation's leading manufacturing lobby; Peirano occupied various posts in the UIA itself from 1993 to 2004. Between 2003 and 2004 he was an adviser for the Subsecretariat for Small and Medium Enterprise and Regional Development, where he specialized in the resolution of the economic asymmetries between Argentina and Brazil in the context of Mercosur. Before taking the post of Minister of Economy, he had been the senior vice president of the Bank of Investment and Foreign Trade (BICE), as well as the Secretary of Industry, Commerce and Small and Medium Enterprises.

Politically, Peirano supported a social market economy approach. He was considered personally close to former President Kirchner, and kept an amicable relationship with both Chief of Cabinet Alberto Fernández and Minister of Federal Planning Julio de Vido, as well as with Martín Redrado, head of the Central Bank of Argentina. Professionally, he was linked to ARI economist Rubén Lo Vuolo, and was known to be in cordial terms with the leader of the opposition party ARI at the time, Elisa Carrió.

The change from Miceli to Peirano was generally considered uneventful in the context of the broader Argentine economic programme. Peirano's appointment was especially supported by the industrial sector. The former minister expressed strong support for several of the key ideas of the government's economic plan, including the encouragement of industrial exports and import substitution through a relatively undervalued exchange rate sustained by frequent U.S. dollar purchases by the Central Bank.

On 10 December 2007, with the inauguration of President Cristina Fernández de Kirchner's cabinet, Martín Lousteau succeeded Peirano as Minister of Economy. He was appointed president of BICE following the end of his tenure, but ongoing disputes with the powerful Commerce Secretary, Guillermo Moreno, led to Peirano's resignation in July 2009.

He later expressed his opposition to the foreign exchange controls implemented in 2012, and while Peirano remained broadly supportive of economic interventionism he believed this policy had gone to far and had become counterproductive.

Preceded by Felisa Miceli	Minister of Economy; 2007	Succeeded by Martín Lousteau
