= José Ber Gelbard =

Polish-Argentine activist, politician and economic adviser

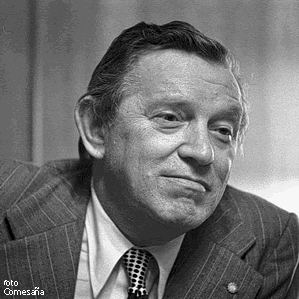

Minister of Economy
- In office 25 May 1973 – 21 October 1974
- President: See list: Héctor Cámpora Raúl Lastiri Juan Perón Isabel Perón
- Preceded by: Jorge Wehbe
- Succeeded by: Alfredo Gomez Morales

Personal details
- Born: Joseph Gelbard; 14 April 1917 Radomsko, Kingdom of Poland
- Died: 4 October 1977 (aged 60) Washington, D.C., U.S.
- Party: Communist Party
- Spouse: Dina Haskel (m. 1938)
- Occupation: Businessman

José Ber Gelbard (14 April 1917 – 4 October 1977) was a Polish-born Argentine activist and politician, and a member of the Argentine Communist Party. He also helped organize the Confederación General Económica (CGE), made up of small and medium-sized business. Beginning about 1954, he was appointed as an economic advisor to Juan Perón and repeatedly was called back to serve as Minister of Finance to successive governments until the military coup of March 1976. He fled with his family shortly before the coup, gaining political asylum in the United States and settling in Washington, D.C.

== Early life and education ==
Born Joseph Gelbard into a Jewish family in Radomsko, Poland, in 1917, his family emigrated in 1930 to Argentina. They settled in Tucumán, 800 mi (1,287 km) north of Buenos Aires. Other family were already there, as well as immigrant communities of Sephardic and European Jews, and Arabs from the Middle East (turcos). During the Great Depression, Gelbard helped support the family as a street peddler of men's ties and belts.

== Marriage and family ==
By 1938 Gelbard had saved some money and married Dina Haskel. They settled in Catamarca, where he started a men's clothing store named "Casa Nueva York". They had children together, including a son Fernando Gelbard. Fernando became a jazz pianist and flautist, composer and record producer. In 1974 he recorded Didi (named for his wife) with a five-man jazz group in Buenos Aires. Their music was ahead of its time in its combination of Latin and Afro-American music, bebop and bossa nova. The record was remastered and released in 2002.

== Political career ==
Gelbard became a Communist activist, involved in several causes, including Jewish armed groups defending the Jewish community in Tucumán from the abuses of local Nazi groups. He joined the Democratic Union, a loose alliance against candidate Juan Perón, during the 1945–46 electoral campaign.

Gelbard became involved in business politics, becoming a leader in the Chamber of Commerce in Catamarca. He represented the small and medium business sectors, many of whose owners were immigrants and new businessmen. He came to believe that the millions of small industries and merchants needed to unite to become a force that could negotiate with Perón's pro-labor forces. He became the "national bourgeoisie's" principal ideologue, and "the most articulate advocate of an alliance between business, the state and labor, behind a federalist and nationalist economic program."

During this period, he helped organize the CGE (Confederación General Económica), a union of millions of industrialists and businessmen, with enough strength to negotiate with the government and labor unions. In 1953, he traveled throughout the provinces organizing businessmen under the CGE and was named as its first president.

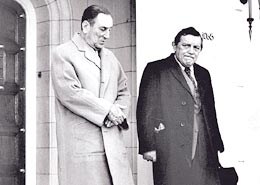
Gelbard (right) and Juan Perón.

In 1954, Gelbard moved with his family to Buenos Aires. He was soon appointed to Perón's cabinet as a minister without portfolio, working on economic issues. He continued his fight for small and medium businesses, opposing perceived imperialist interests and agro interests that would have preferred a country of grain and cattle exporters. He strongly opposed the philosophy of making Argentina 'The world's barn'. The CGE executive committee also had strong representation in the government, sitting on the Comisión Económica Consultíva and participating in its numerous sub-committees: housing, prices, labor, foreign relations, transport and cost of living, for instance.

In 1955, a military coup d'etat toppled Perón. The new military government prosecuted Gelbard and froze his assets, as he was a known advisor to Peron. In later years, the generals called elections, there were new coups d'état, new presidents, and new elections. Gelbard was always called in as an economic advisor of all subsequent presidents, whether generals or democratically elected. In 1972, following a request from General Lanusse, then dictator, Gelbard negotiated the return of General Juan Perón from his exile in Madrid.

After many trips and secret negotiations, elections were called. As Perón was still not allowed to be president, his associate Dr. Héctor Cámpora ran and was elected president on May 25, 1973. At Perón's direction, Cámpora appointed Gelbard as minister of "economy, finance, public works and trade."

Cámpora stepped aside later that year and Perón was elected president. His third wife, Isabel Perón, ran and won as his vice president. Under Cámpora, Gelbard implemented "The Social Pact" (El Pacto Social), "cosigned in Congress by the CGE and CGT" which called for a freeze in prices and salaries so the country could progress economically, and for increased cooperation between business and government under a Three-Year Plan. Public investment was featured in a dominant role in the plan, with a government group, Corporación de Empresas Nacionales (CEN), set up to oversee this. It was to promote new industries and coordinate planning among different business sectors. The Peron government also nationalized the banking industry.

Gelbard boosted exports by unilaterally lifting the Cuban blockade and selling one billion dollars in good to Cuba, including United States-branded cars manufactured in Argentina. (The US was forced to accept this action after Gelbard threatened to close all US car factories in the country.) He planned many economic missions. Gelbard headed large groups of Argentine businessmen and industrialists on visits to Cuba, Venezuela, Chile, the Soviet Union, Poland, Hungary, Czechoslovakia and other countries. On 1 July 1974, Perón died, leaving a divided party. Isabel Perón, his widow, who had earlier been chosen Vice President as a compromise between feuding factions, succeeded him to the presidency. Increasingly strained by rising labor union wage demands and the 1973 oil shock alike, the Social Pact gradually was unable to contain inflation, and class cooperation declined. In November 1974, Gelbard resigned, as the country's economic indicators continued to decline and his "Zero Inflation" plan failed.

In March 1976 the military made a coup d'état and overthrew Isabel Perón's presidency. Later accused of having bribed military officials to be allowed to leave, Gelbard and his family left the country before the coup and obtained political asylum in the United States. All his assets in Argentina were frozen. The reigning military junta sentenced Joseph Gelbard and his son Fernando to death in absentia.

== Death ==
On 4 October 1977, Gelbard died of a heart attack in Washington, D.C., aged 60. Under a Radical government, his son Fernando later returned with his family to Argentina after the return of democratically elected government. In 1989 he was appointed as Argentine ambassador to France. He filed a claim for US$20,000,000 with the Argentine government, for "all the time he could not make use of the family assets confiscated by the military." It is unclear whether he succeeded in his claim.

Political offices
Preceded by Jorge Wehbe	Minister of Economy; 1973–1974	Succeeded by Alfredo Gómez Morales
