= Roberto Alemann =

Argentine economist (1922–2020)

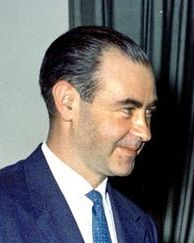
- Alemann in 1961

Minister of Economy of Argentina
- In office December 22, 1981 – June 30, 1982
- President: Leopoldo Galtieri
- Preceded by: Lorenzo Sigaut
- Succeeded by: José María Dagnino Pastore
- In office April 26, 1961 – January 12, 1962
- President: Arturo Frondizi
- Preceded by: Álvaro Alsogaray
- Succeeded by: Carlos Coll Benegas

Personal details
- Born: December 22, 1922 Buenos Aires, Argentina
- Died: March 27, 2020 (aged 97) Buenos Aires, Argentina
- Education: University of Buenos Aires University of Bern
- Occupation: Publisher and academic

Roberto Alemann (December 22, 1922 – March 27, 2020) was an Argentine lawyer, economist, publisher, and academic.

Twice Minister of Economy, he was also the Argentine ambassador to the United States and director of the traditional Argentine-German newspaper Argentinisches Tageblatt.

He was implementing an economic policy that aimed to decrease the inflation rate, deregulate, and destatize the economy until the Argentine Armed Forces began the Falklands War in April 1982. The liberal economic reforms proposed since December 1981, during the military dictatorship of Leopoldo Fortunato Galtieri, remained unfinished.

== Career ==
Alemann was born in Buenos Aires, Argentina, in 1922. His family, prominent German Argentines of Swiss extraction, had established the nation's premier German-language daily, Argentinisches Tageblatt, in 1874.

He graduated from the Buenos Aires National College in 1941, and from the University of Buenos Aires with a law degree in 1947. Alemann studied economics at the University of Bern in 1947–48, and returned to Buenos Aires to complete a doctorate in social sciences in 1952.

== First work ==
Opposed to the populist policies of President Juan Perón, he joined senior policy adviser Raúl Prebisch's team following the 1955 coup against Perón, and took part in negotiations leading to the first loans granted to the Argentine government by the Paris Club of multilateral creditors.

== Academy ==
Alemann co-founded the Argentine Association of Political Economy in 1957. The group prioritized dealing with structural inflation over the monetarist approach favored by more conservative policy-makers, such as Economy Minister Álvaro Alsogaray, who was appointed to the post in 1959 without President Arturo Frondizi's support. Frondizi, a proponent of developmentalism, opposed Alsogaray's austerity program, which brought down inflation, though at the cost of a severe recession in 1959.

== Minister of Economy of President Frondizi ==
Alsogaray was replaced in April 1961 by Roberto Alemann. Alemann's structuralist approach complemented unofficial Frondizi point man Rogelio Julio Frigerio's policies well, as both focused on correcting the adverse effects of financing increasingly costly machinery imports with raw material exports of declining value (a terms of trade problem common to developing countries), though conservative and military pressure resulted in his removal in January 1962.

== Private sector ==
Following his ousting, Alemann returned to the private sector as a lobbyist for Swiss banking giant UBS, and was also, from 1964 to 1973, Professor of Economic Policy at his alma mater (authoring a textbook in 1970). The right-wing economist appointed by the National Reorganization Process dictatorship installed in 1976, José Alfredo Martínez de Hoz, implemented a sweeping program of financial deregulation and free trade which by 1981 collapsed under the weight of a US$37 billion foreign debt – most of it the result of a wave of private currency speculation and government military spending. Alemann's brother, Juan Alemann, served as Treasury Secretary during the dictatorship and was nearly killed by a bomb placed in his residence in 1979, allegedly by a Montoneros guerilla operative.

== Minister of Economy of President Galtieri ==
Named Economy Minister by a new dictator, General Leopoldo Galtieri, in December 1981, Alemann departed from his expansionist policies of twenty years earlier and introduced his own austerity program: cuts in public spending, accelerated devaluation of the peso (which had already lost 75% of its value during 1981), and a mandatory wage freeze (amid 10% monthly inflation).

He also attempted to repair relations with the International Monetary Fund by proposing the privatization of an array of state enterprises, and elicited signals of support from the Reagan administration, but also triggered protest from labor unions, culminating in a massive, March 30, 1982, rally against Alemann by the General Confederation of Labour (Argentina) (CGT), then South America's largest trade union.

Ultimately, Galtieri's invasion of the Falkland Islands, on April 2, derailed Alemann's rapprochement with U.S. and European creditors, and following Galtieri's defeat and subsequent resignation in June, Alemann was replaced; the economy, which had fallen 6% in 1981, fell by as much again in 1982 to its lowest level in a decade.

== Later years ==
He retired from public service, devoting his time to the Tageblatt as managing editor, and contributing occasional op-ed columns in the centrist Clarín.

Continuing to lecture on economic policy matters, the octogenarian was assaulted by opponents at least twice after 2002, though he suffered only minor injuries.

He died at the age of 97 in Buenos Aires in 2020.

== Bibliography ==
- Sistemas Económicos (1953), Buenos Aires: Arayú
- Hacia una política de inversiones (1960), Buenos Aires: Selección Contable
- Curso de Política Económica Argentina (1970–81), Buenos Aires: EUDEBA
- Breve historia de la política económica argentina (1989), Buenos Aires: Claridad
- Recordando a Kennedy (1996), Buenos Aires: Sudamericana
