= José A. Terry =

Argentine lawyer and politician

José Antonio Terry
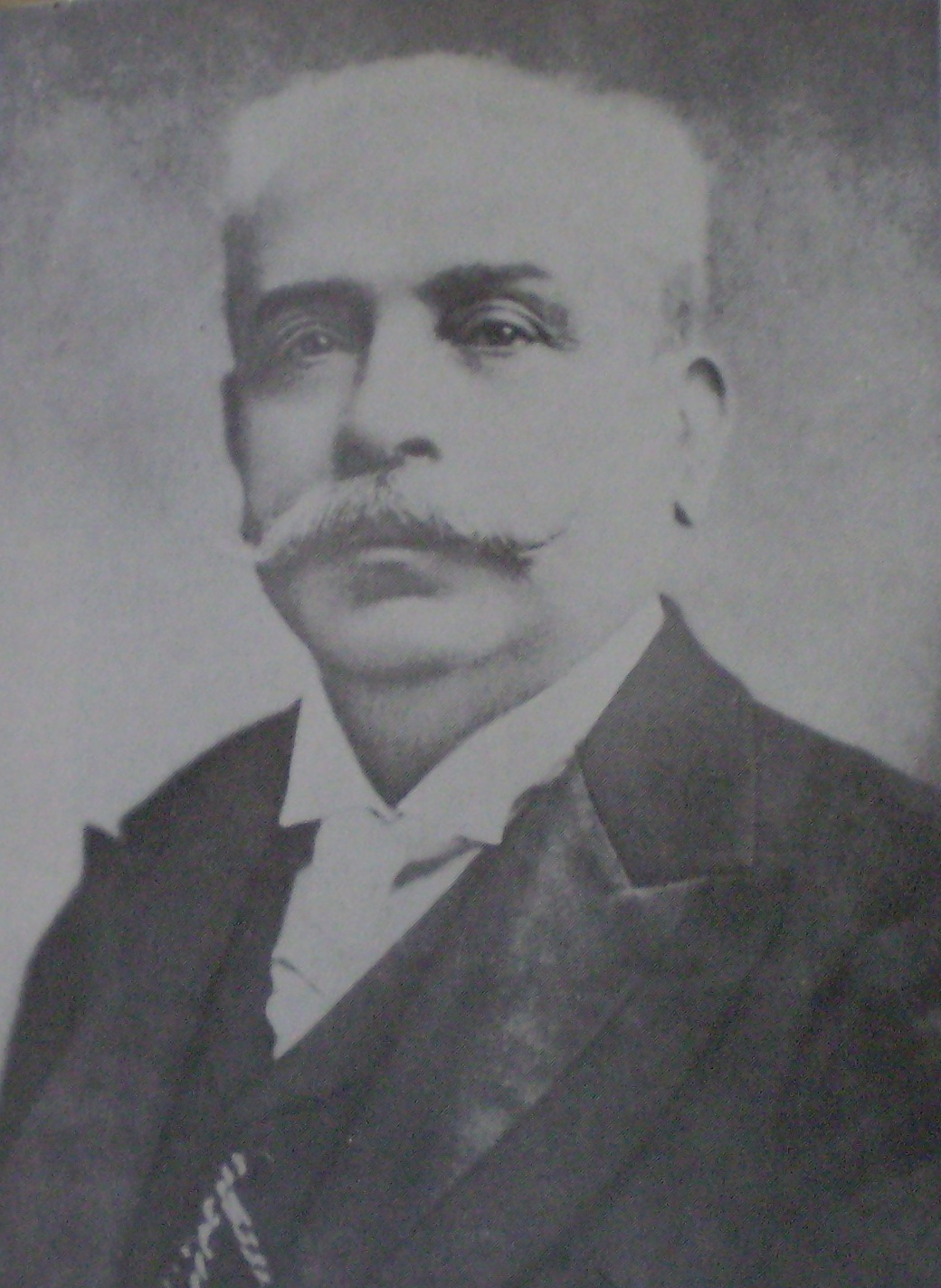

Minister of the Treasury
- In office 1893 – 1895 (first period)
- President: Luis Sáenz Peña
- Preceded by: Mariano Demaría
- Succeeded by: Juan José Romero

Personal details
- Born: José Antonio Terry Costa; 31 October 1846 Bagé, Brazil
- Died: 8 December 1910 (aged 64) Buenos Aires, Argentina
- Resting place: La Recoleta Cemetery
- Occupation: Politician
- Profession: Lawyer

José Antonio Terry Costa (31 October 1846 – 8 December 1910) was an Argentine lawyer and politician, who served as Minister Plenipotentiary of the Argentine Republic.

== Biography ==
Terry was born in Brazil, during the exile of his parents José Antonio Terry and Sotera Costa. In 1850 he settled with his family in Buenos Aires, performing his primary and secondary studies in the city. He received his doctorate in jurisprudence at the University of Buenos Aires in 1871. At the beginning of his career he was a journalist in the newspapers La Nación and La Prensa, Time later exerted like professor of Finances in the National University.

José A. Terry was deputy and senator of the province of Buenos Aires, and was chosen like deputy of the Argentine nation in 1871. He also served in the post of Minister of the Treasury in the governments of Luis Sáenz Peña, Julio Argentino Roca and Manuel Quintana.

José Antonio Terry was married to Leonor Quirno Costa, daughter of Gregorio José Quirno and Fernanda Costa, belonging to a traditional Creole family of Spanish and French roots. He and his wife were parents of three children who were born deaf: José Antonio, Leonor and Sotera Terry.

His son, José Antonio Terry was married to Amalia Amoedo Vilaró, daughter of Amalia Florencia Vilaró and Hilario Amoedo, belonging to families Amoedo, Canavery and Morel.

José Terry was grandson of Andrés Terry Álvarez, a Spanish who arrived in Buenos Aires towards the year 1790. His paternal ancestor William Terry, an Irish Catholic born in County Cork, was an army officer who served in the Irish brigades at the service of James II of England during his exile in France. The great-grandfather of José Terry, Gabriel Coste, was a French farmer of Collonges-la-Rouge, Corrèze, in France, who emigrated to Argentina around 1760–1770.
