= Francisco Uriburu =

Argentine businessman and politician

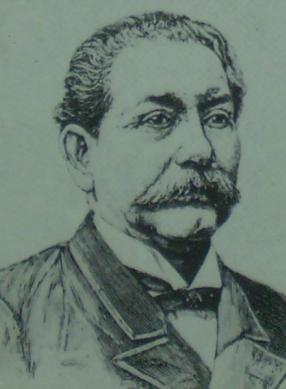
Francisco Uriburu

Francisco Uriburu (July 13, 1837 – February 10, 1906) was an Argentine businessman and politician, member of the Argentine Chamber of Deputies for Salta province from 1872 to 1876. He was Minister of the Treasury in 1890.
