= Hernán Lacunza =

Argentine economist

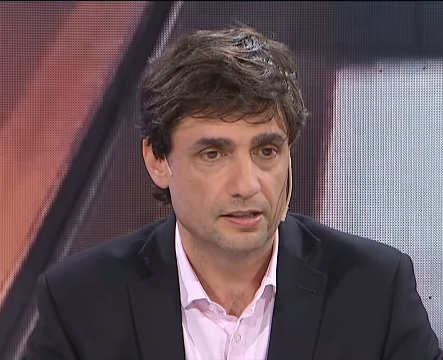

Minister of the Treasury of Argentina
- In office 17 August 2019 – 10 December 2019
- President: Mauricio Macri
- Preceded by: Nicolás Dujovne
- Succeeded by: Martin Guzman

Minister of Economy of Buenos Aires
- In office 10 December 2015 – 17 August 2019
- Governor: Maria Eugenia Vidal
- Preceded by: Silvina Batakis
- Succeeded by: Damian Bonari

Personal details
- Born: 1969 (age 56–57) Buenos Aires, Argentina
- Party: Republican Proposal
- Other political affiliations: Cambiemos
- Education: University of Buenos Aires Torcuato di Tella University

Jorge Roberto Hernán Lacunza (born February 25, 1969) is an Argentine economist, appointed in 2019 as Minister of the Treasury of the Mauricio Macri administration.

== Biography ==
He received a bachelor's degree in economics from the University of Buenos Aires in 1994. Between 1997 and 1998 he completed a postgraduate degree in economics at Torcuato di Tella University.

== Political career ==
In the private function, Lacunza was economic analyst at Scotiabank Quilmes (2004–2007) and a consultant at the Capital Foundation (2007–2002).

From 2002 to 2005 Lacunza was director of the Center for International Economics at the Secretary of Commerce and International Economic Relations within the Ministry of Foreign Affairs.

Lacunza was appointed as General Manager at Central Bank of Argentina between 2008 and early 2010, after being designated as Chief Economist between 2005 and 2008

He returned to the private sector by founding his consulting firm Empiria Consultores Economía y Finanza.

In December 2013, he assumed the position of General Manager of the Bank of the City of Buenos Aires during the government of Mauricio Macri in the city.

== Minister of Economy of the Province of Buenos Aires ==
On December 10, 2015, Lacunza assumed as Minister of Economy of the Province of Buenos Aires (the largest province of Argentina that houses 17 million inhabitants, almost 40% of the Argentine population) under the government of María Eugenia Vidal. The province was broken due to the strong fiscal deficit, high taxes and no public works.

During his period al Minister the Province recovered by law the so-called Fondo del Conurbano, in compensation of an historical discrimination in the federal tax co-participation regime (the share of Buenos Aires grew from 18% to 22% of federal tax revenues), the tax pressure and the most distortive taxes to production activity (ingresos brutos) were reduced, and the share of public works on provincial budget grew from 3,7% to more than 5% on average.

At the same time, in spite of a sharp fall in activity level because of macroeconomic problems since 2018, the financial fiscal deficit was reduced from 1.1% to 0.6% of GDP, as well as the Province recovered the primary surplus since 2017 until now.

== Minister of Treasury of Argentina ==
On August 17, 2019, in a context of high economic and political uncertainty after the government had been defeated at primary elections, Lacunza assumed the position of Minister of Treasury of Argentina. On August 28, he announced the extension of short-term debt maturities (Letes and Lebacs), sending to congress a bill promoting voluntary debt swap under local law, initiating a foreign debt swap process, and re-signing maturities with the International Monetary Fund. In all cases these are term extensions, without capital or interest.

On 1 September by decree, he arranged currency controls: a limit of $10,000 per month for the purchase of dollars, the obligation for transnational companies to seek authorization from the Central Bank to spin dividends to their parent companies abroad, and a maximum time limit for exporters to settle the currencies generated in their operations.

He said that they were awkward and transitional measures to avoid major ills because the economy faced a "crisis of confidence".

After the general election, it increased currency controls: allowing only the purchase of dollar $200 per month.

== Other activities ==
- Joint World Bank-IMF Development Committee, Member (2019)
- Central American Bank for Economic Integration (CABEI), Ex-Officio Member of the Board of Governors (2019)
- Inter-American Investment Corporation (IIC), Ex-Officio Member of the Board of Governors (2019)
- International Monetary Fund (IMF), Ex-Officio Member of the Board of Governors (2019)
- World Bank, Ex-Officio Member of the Board of Governors (2019)
- Multilateral Investment Guarantee Agency (MIGA), World Bank Group, Ex-Officio Member of the Board of Governors (2019)
