= Argentinisches Tageblatt =

- Type: Daily newspaper
- Format: broadsheet
- Publisher: Roberto Alemann
- Founded: 1878
- Ceased publication: 13 January 2023 (print)
- Political alignment: Centrist
- Headquarters: Buenos Aires, Argentina
- Circulation: 15,000
- Website: Argentinisches Tageblatt

Argentinisches Tageblatt (lit. 'Argentine Daily') was a German-language weekly newspaper published every Friday in Buenos Aires, Argentina. It was last published on January 13, 2023 and transitioned to online.

== History ==
The newspaper was founded by a Swiss immigrant from Bern, Johann Alemann, and his son, Moritz, in 1878. It was first published as the Argentinisches Wochenblatt ('Argentine Weekly'). Together with his other sons, Theodor and Ernst, Alemann then inaugurated a daily newspaper, Argentinisches Tageblatt, in 1889. The weekly Wochenblatt appeared as a weekend section of the newspaper until 1967. In 1981, despite its name, the Argentinisches Tageblatt was changed to a weekly newspaper.

The Argentinisches Tageblatt was one of the many newspapers banned by the Nazis during the period of the Third Reich. Possession of the paper was forbidden throughout the territory of the Third Reich while Hitler was in power, due to the progressive stance adopted by editor-in-chief Ernesto Alemann.

After the military coup of 1976 the publication supported the new authorities. An editorial called for "night and fog actions" in which opponents of the regime should disappear. Roberto Alemann, the son of the publisher, was appointed minister for economy by the military and was thus part of the regime, under which 30,000 people died between 1976 and 1983.

Roberto Alemann has been running the Tageblatt since the death of Ernesto Alemann in 1982. After Roberto's death in 2020, his brother Juan Alemann took over.
