= Ministry of Economy (Argentina) =

Government ministry of Argentina

Coordinates: 34°36′34″S 58°22′13″W

- Ministerio de Economía
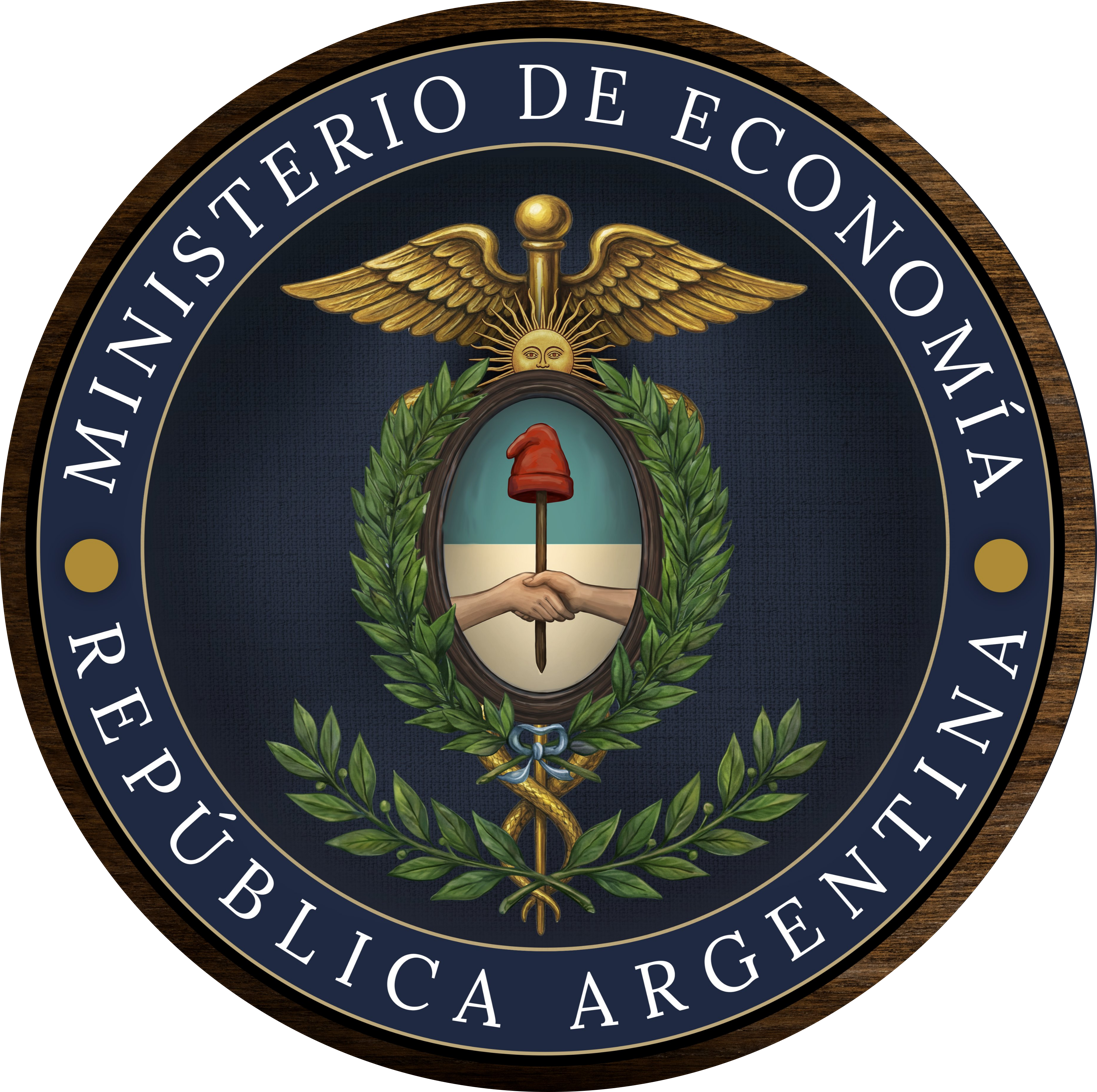

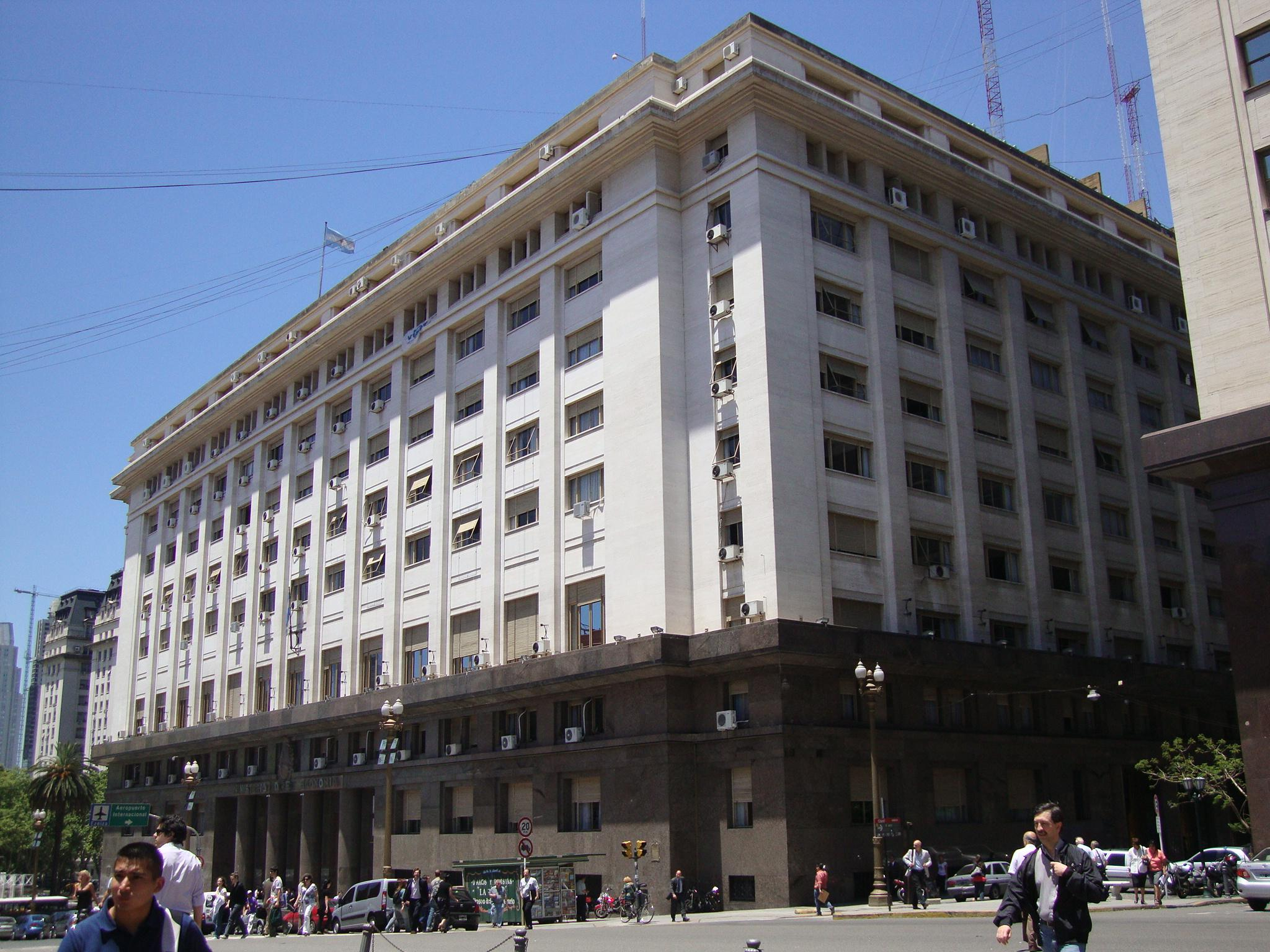
- Palacio de Hacienda, headquarters

Ministry overview
- Formed: 1854; 172 years ago (as the Ministry of the Treasury)
- Jurisdiction: Government of Argentina
- Headquarters: Palacio de Hacienda; Buenos Aires
- Employees: 4,000 (2009)
- Annual budget: $ 616,641,458,521 (2021)
- Minister responsible: Luis Caputo
- Child agencies: Secretariat of Public Works; Secretary of Transport; SSN; YCRT
- Website: argentina.gob.ar/economia

The Ministry of Economy (Spanish: Ministerio de Economía) of Argentina is the country's state treasury and a ministry of the national executive power that manages economic policy.

The Ministry of Economy is one of the oldest ministries in the Argentine government, having existed continuously since the formation of the first Argentine executive in 1854, in the presidency of Justo José de Urquiza – albeit under the name of Ministry of the Treasury. The current minister responsible is Luis Caputo, who has served since 2023 in the cabinet of Javier Milei.

== Headquarters ==
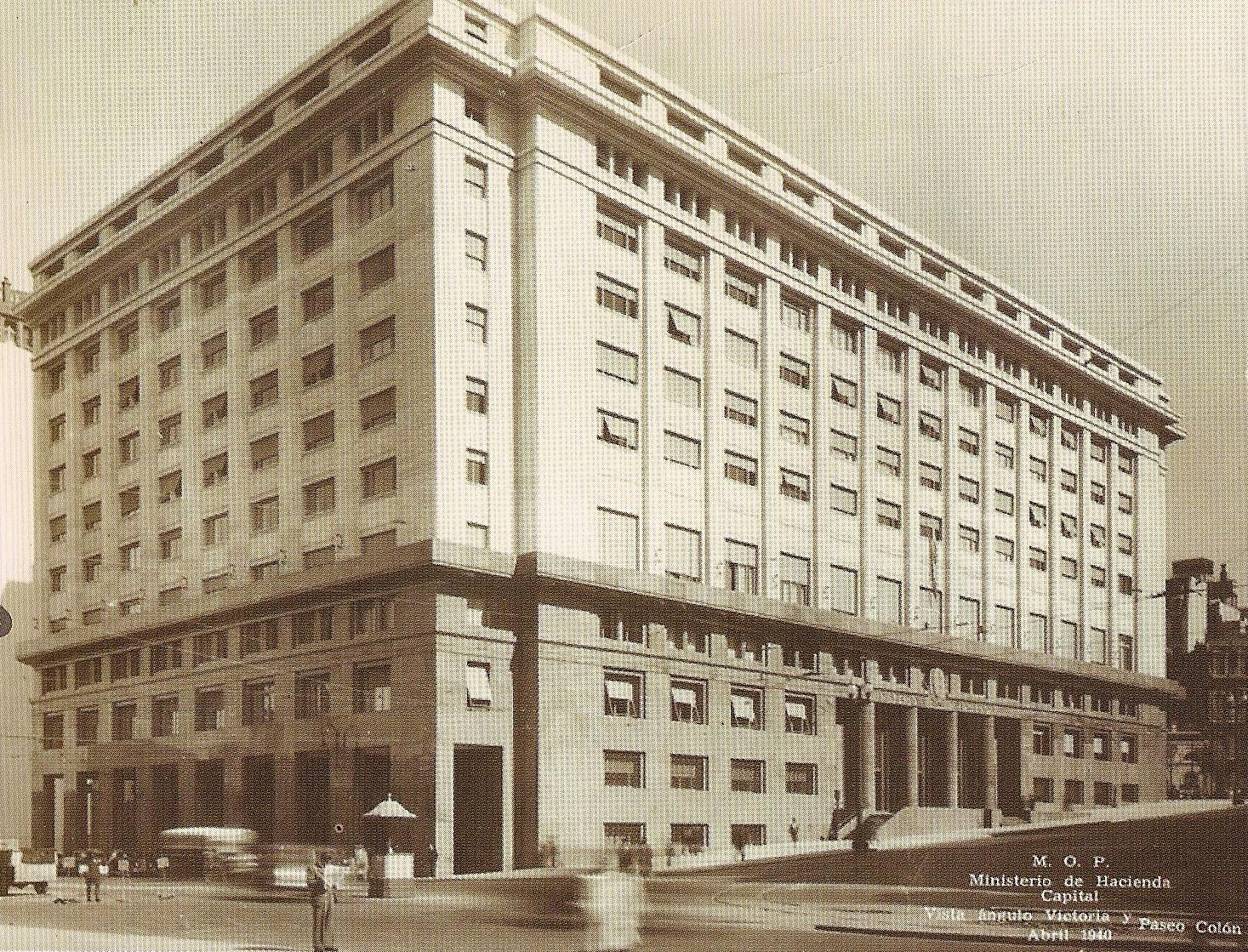
The Economy Ministry in 1940

The Argentine Ministry of the Treasury has, since the building's 1939 inaugural, been based in a 14-story Rationalist office building designed by local architect Carlos Pibernat. The Economy Ministry building was built on a 0.57 ha (1.4 ac) Montserrat neighborhood lot facing the Casa Rosada presidential office building to the north, and the Defense Ministry (Libertador Building) to the east – a government building also designed by Pibernat.

The building's lobby was decorated with murals painted by the architect's brother, Antonio Pibernat, a Post-Impressionist painter influenced by the naturalist Barbizon School.

The post has existed on a formal basis since the 1826 inaugural of Bernardino Rivadavia, who named lawmaker Salvador María del Carril as the nation's first official Ministro de Hacienda. The office became among the most powerful in Argentine Government during the generation after 1880, when English Argentine investment, foreign trade, and immigration spurred development. Customs collections (source of over half of public revenues at the time) and the Central Bank were among the responsibilities placed under the Economy Ministry's aegis, and successive ministers' policies were often enacted through presidential decrees.

Its influence grew further when it absorbed the cabinet post of Minister of Public Works in 1991, to help facilitate Economy Minister Domingo Cavallo's privatizations initiative, and, in turn, divested oversight over the nation's goods-producing sectors with the 2008 designation of the Production Ministry by President Cristina Kirchner, in a bid to improve strained relations with the country's agrarian sector following the 2008 Argentine government conflict with the agricultural sector over export tariffs.

The Ministry of the Treasury was appropriated a US$1.7 billion operational budget in 2009, and employed over 4,000 staffers.

== List of ministers ==
No.	Minister	Party	Term	President
Ministry of the Treasury (1854–1958)
1	Mariano Fragueiro	Unitarian Party	6 March 1854 – 10 October 1854	Justo José de Urquiza
2	Juan del Campillo	Independent	10 October 1854 – 2 June 1856	Justo José de Urquiza
3	Agustín Justo de la Vega	Independent	2 June 1856 – 16 April 1857	Justo José de Urquiza
4	Elías Bedoya	Independent	18 April 1857 – 16 December 1859	Justo José de Urquiza
5	Pedro Lucas Funes	Independent	16 December 1859 – 5 March 1860	Justo José de Urquiza
6	Tomás Arias	Independent	14 March 1860 – 11 August 1860	Santiago Derqui
7	Norberto de la Riestra	Unitarian Party	11 August 1860 – 6 February 1861	Santiago Derqui
8	Vicente del Castillo	Independent	6 February 1861 – 5 November 1861	Santiago Derqui
9	Dalmacio Vélez Sarsfield	Unitarian Party	12 October 1862 – 29 February 1864	Bartolomé Mitre
10	Lucas González	Independent	29 February 1864 – 12 October 1868	Bartolomé Mitre
11	José Benjamín Gorostiaga	Nationalist Party	12 October 1868 – 13 October 1870	Domingo Faustino Sarmiento
12	Luis Lorenzo Domínguez	Independent	13 October 1870 – 13 February 1874	Domingo Faustino Sarmiento
13	Santiago Cortínez	Independent	13 February 1870 – 12 October 1874	Domingo Faustino Sarmiento
13	Santiago Cortínez	Independent	12 October 1874 – 2 August 1875	Nicolás Avellaneda
14	Lucas González	Independent	2 August 1875 – 20 May 1876	Nicolás Avellaneda
15	Norberto de la Riestra	Independent	20 May 1876 – 26 August 1876	Nicolás Avellaneda
16	Victorino de la Plaza	Independent	31 August 1876 – 7 May 1880	Nicolás Avellaneda
17	Santiago Cortínez	National Autonomist Party	7 May 1880 – 12 October 1880	Nicolás Avellaneda
18	Juan José Romero	Independent	12 October 1880 – 12 October 1883	Julio Argentino Roca
19	Victorino de la Plaza	National Autonomist Party	25 October 1883 – 9 March 1885	Julio Argentino Roca
20	Wenceslao Pacheco	National Autonomist Party	9 March 1885 – 12 October 1886	Julio Argentino Roca
20	Wenceslao Pacheco	National Autonomist Party	12 October 1886 – 28 February 1889	Miguel Ángel Juárez
21	Rufino Varela	National Autonomist Party	28 February 1889 – 24 August 1889	Miguel Ángel Juárez
22	Wenceslao Pacheco	National Autonomist Party	27 August 1889 – 14 April 1890	Miguel Ángel Juárez
23	Francisco Uriburu	National Autonomist Party	18 April 1890 – 7 June 1890	Miguel Ángel Juárez
24	Juan A. García Seoane	Independent	9 June 1890 – 6 August 1890	Miguel Ángel Juárez
25	Vicente Fidel López	National Autonomist Party	7 August 1890 – 22 October 1891	Carlos Pellegrini
26	Emilio Hansen	Independent	22 October 1891 – 12 October 1892	Carlos Pellegrini
27	Juan José Romero	Independent	12 October 1892 – 7 June 1893	Luis Sáenz Peña
28	Marco Aurelio Avellaneda	National Autonomist Party	7 June 1893 – 5 July 1893	Luis Sáenz Peña
29	Mariano Demaría	Independent	5 July 1893 – 12 August 1893	Luis Sáenz Peña
30	José A. Terry	National Autonomist Party	12 August 1893 – 23 January 1895	Luis Sáenz Peña
31	Juan José Romero	National Autonomist Party	23 January 1895 – 21 October 1897	José Evaristo Uriburu
32	Wenceslao Escalante	National Autonomist Party	21 October 1897 – 12 October 1898	José Evaristo Uriburu
33	José María Rosa	National Autonomist Party	12 October 1898 – 2 May 1900	Julio Argentino Roca
34	Enrique Berduc	National Autonomist Party	2 May 1900 – 5 July 1901	Julio Argentino Roca
35	Marco Aurelio Avellaneda	National Autonomist Party	11 July 1901 – 12 October 1904	Julio Argentino Roca
36	José A. Terry	National Autonomist Party	12 October 1904 – 15 March 1906	Manuel Quintana
37	Norberto Piñero	Independent	15 March 1906 – 21 September 1906	José Figueroa Alcorta
38	Eleodoro Lobos	Independent	21 September 1906 – 20 September 1907	José Figueroa Alcorta
39	Manuel María de Iriondo	Radical Civic Union	20 September 1907 – 12 October 1910	José Figueroa Alcorta
40	José María Rosa	National Autonomist Party	12 October 1910 – 5 August 1912	Roque Sáenz Peña
41	Enrique Simón Pérez	Independent	5 August 1912 – 28 March 1913	Roque Sáenz Peña
42	Norberto Piñero	Independent	28 March 1913 – 16 July 1913	Roque Sáenz Peña
43	Lorenzo Anadón	Independent	21 July 1913 – 16 February 1914	Roque Sáenz Peña
44	Enrique Carbó Ortiz	Independent	16 February 1914 – 9 August 1914	Roque Sáenz Peña
44	Enrique Carbó Ortiz	Independent	9 August 1914 – 16 August 1915	Victorino de la Plaza
45	Francisco J. Oliver	Independent	16 August 1915 – 12 October 1916	Victorino de la Plaza
46	Domingo Salaberry	Radical Civic Union	12 October 1916 – 12 October 1922	Hipólito Yrigoyen
47	Rafael Herrera Vegas	Radical Civic Union	12 October 1922 – 8 October 1923	Marcelo T. de Alvear
48	Víctor M. Molina	Radical Civic Union	9 October 1923 – 12 October 1928	Marcelo T. de Alvear
49	Enrique Pérez Colman	Radical Civic Union	12 October 1928 – 6 September 1930	Hipólito Yrigoyen
50	Enrique Simón Pérez	Independent	6 September 1930 – 16 April 1931	José Félix Uriburu
51	Enrique Uriburu	Independent	17 April 1931 – 20 February 1932	José Félix Uriburu
52	Alberto Hueyo	Independent	20 February 1932 – 20 August 1933	Agustín Pedro Justo
53	Federico Pinedo	PSI	24 August 1933 – 30 December 1935	Agustín Pedro Justo
54	Roberto M. Ortiz	Radical Civic Union	30 December 1935 – 21 June 1937	Agustín Pedro Justo
55	Carlos Alberto Acevedo	National Democratic Party	21 June 1973 – 20 February 1938	Agustín Pedro Justo
56	Pedro Groppo	Independent	20 February 1938 – 2 September 1940	Roberto M. Ortiz
57	Federico Pinedo	PSI	2 September 1940 – 13 March 1941	Roberto M. Ortiz
58	Carlos Alberto Acevedo	National Democratic Party	17 March 1941 – 27 June 1942	Roberto M. Ortiz
58	Carlos Alberto Acevedo	National Democratic Party	27 June 1942 – 4 June 1943	Ramón Castillo
59	Jorge A. Santamarina	Independent	4 June 1943 – 7 June 1943	Arturo Rawson
59	Jorge A. Santamarina	Independent	7 June 1943 – 14 October 1943	Pedro Pablo Ramírez
60	César Ameghino	Independent	15 October 1943 – 11 March 1944	Pedro Pablo Ramírez
60	César Ameghino	Independent	11 March 1944 – 7 May 1945	Edelmiro Farrell
61	Ceferino Alonso Irigoyen	Independent	7 May 1945 – 23 August 1945	Edelmiro Farrell
62	Armando Antille	Radical Civic Union	23 August 1945 – 20 October 1945	Edelmiro Farrell
63	Amaro Ávalos	Independent	20 October 1945 – 4 June 1946	Edelmiro Farrell
64	Ramón Cereijo	Peronist Party	4 June 1946 – 4 June 1952	Juan Perón
65	Pedro Bonanni	Peronist Party	4 June 1952 – 20 September 1955	Juan Perón
66	Eugenio Folcini	Independent	20 September 1955 – 13 November 1955	Eduardo Lonardi
67	Eugenio Blanco	Radical Civic Union	14 November 1955 – 25 January 1957	Pedro Aramburu
68	Roberto Verrier	Independent	26 January 1957 – 26 March 1957	Pedro Aramburu
69	Adalberto Krieger Vasena	Independent	26 March 1957 – 1 May 1958	Pedro Aramburu
Ministry of Economy (1958–1966)
70	Emilio Donato del Carril	Radical Civic Union	17 June 1958 – 24 June 1959	Arturo Frondizi
71	Álvaro Alsogaray	Independent Civic Party	25 June 1959 – 26 April 1961	Arturo Frondizi
72	Roberto Alemann	Independent	26 April 1961 – 12 January 1962	Arturo Frondizi
73	Carlos Coll Benegas	Independent	15 January 1962 – 26 March 1962	Arturo Frondizi
74	Jorge Wehbe	Independent	26 March 1962 – 29 March 1962	Arturo Frondizi
74	Jorge Wehbe	Independent	29 March 1962 – 6 April 1962	José María Guido
75	Federico Pinedo	Independent	6 April 1962 – 25 April 1962	José María Guido
76	Álvaro Alsogaray	Independent Civic Party	30 June 1962 – 10 December 1962	José María Guido
77	Eustaquio Méndez Delfino	Independent	10 December 1962 – 13 May 1963	José María Guido
78	José A. Martínez de Hoz	Independent	21 May 1963 – 12 October 1963	José María Guido
79	Eugenio Blanco	Radical Civic Union	12 October 1963 – 5 August 1964	Arturo Illia
80	Juan Carlos Pugliese	Radical Civic Union	19 August 1964 – 28 June 1966	Arturo Illia
Ministry of Economy and Labour (1966–1971)
81	Jorge Salimei	Christian Democratic Party	4 October 1966 – 3 January 1967	Juan Carlos Onganía
82	Adalbert Krieger Vasena	Independent	3 January 1967 – 11 June 1969	Juan Carlos Onganía
83	José Dagnino Pastore	Independent	11 June 1969 – 17 June 1970	Juan Carlos Onganía
84	Carlos Moyano Llerena	Independent	18 June 1970 – 15 October 1970	Roberto M. Levingston
85	Aldo Ferrer	Radical Civic Union	26 October 1970 – 21 May 1971	Roberto M. Levingston
Ministry of the Treasury and Finances (1966–1971)
86	Juan A. Quilici	Independent	1 June 1971 – 11 October 1971	Alejandro Lanusse
87	Cayetano Antonio Licciardo	Independent	11 October 1971 – 13 October 1972	Alejandro Lanusse
88	Jorge Wehbe	Independent	13 October 1972 – 25 May 1973	Alejandro Lanusse
Ministry of Economy (1973–1991)
89	José Ber Gelbard	Communist Party	25 May 1973 – 13 July 1973	Héctor Cámpora
89	José Ber Gelbard	Communist Party	13 July 1973 – 12 October 1973	Raúl Lastiri
89	José Ber Gelbard	Communist Party	12 October 1973 – 1 July 1974	Juan Perón
89	José Ber Gelbard	Communist Party	1 July 1974 – 21 October 1974	Isabel Perón
90	Alfredo Gómez Morales	Justicialist Party	21 October 1974 – 2 June 1975	Isabel Perón
91	Celestino Rodrigo	Justicialist Party	2 June 1975 – 17 July 1975	Isabel Perón
92	Ernesto Corvalán Nanclares	Justicialist Party	17 July 1975 – 22 July 1975	Isabel Perón
93	Pedro Bonanni	Justicialist Party	22 July 1975 – 11 August 1975	Isabel Perón
94	Ernesto Corvalán Nanclares	Justicialist Party	11 August 1975 – 14 August 1975	Isabel Perón
95	Antonio Cafiero	Justicialist Party	14 August 1975 – 3 February 1976	Isabel Perón
96	Emilio Mondelli	Justicialist Party	3 February 1976 – 24 March 1976	Isabel Perón
97	José A. Martínez de Hoz	Independent	29 March 1976 – 31 March 1981	Jorge Rafael Videla
98	Lorenzo Sigaut	Independent	1 April 1981 – 20 December 1981	Roberto Viola
99	Roberto Alemann	Independent	22 December 1981 – 30 June 1982	Leopoldo Galtieri
100	José Dagnino Pastore	Independent	2 July 1982 – 24 August 1982	Reynaldo Bignone
101	Jorge Wehbe	Independent	25 August 1982 – 9 December 1983	Reynaldo Bignone
102	Bernardo Grinspun	Radical Civic Union	10 December 1983 – 18 February 1985	Raúl Alfonsín
103	Juan Vital Sourrouille	Independent	18 February 1985 – 31 March 1989	Raúl Alfonsín
104	Juan Carlos Pugliese	Radical Civic Union	31 March 1989 – 14 May 1989	Raúl Alfonsín
105	Jesús Rodríguez	Radical Civic Union	14 May 1989 – 8 July 1989	Raúl Alfonsín
106	Miguel Ángel Roig	Independent	9 July 1989 – 14 July 1989	Carlos Menem
107	Néstor Mario Rapanelli	Independent	14 July 1989 – 18 December 1989	Carlos Menem
108	Antonio Erman González	Justicialist Party	18 December 1989 – 4 February 1991	Carlos Menem
Ministry of Economy, Public Works and Services (1991-1999)
109	Domingo Cavallo	Justicialist Party	1 March 1991 – 6 August 1996	Carlos Menem
110	Roque Fernández	Justicialist Party	6 August 1996 – 10 December 1999	Carlos Menem
Ministry of Economy (1999–2001)
111	José Luis Machinea	Radical Civic Union	10 December 1999 – 2 March 2001	Fernando de la Rúa
112	Ricardo López Murphy	Radical Civic Union	5 March 2001 – 19 March 2001	Fernando de la Rúa
113	Domingo Cavallo	Action for the Republic	20 March 2001 – 20 December 2001	Fernando de la Rúa
Secretary of the Treasury, Public Finances and Income (2001–2002)
114	Rodolfo Frigeri	Justicialist Party	23 December 2001 – 30 December 2001	Adolfo Rodríguez Saá
Ministry of Economy (2002)
115	Jorge Remes Lenicov	Justicialist Party	3 January 2002 – 27 April 2002	Eduardo Duhalde
Ministry of Economy and Production (2002–2008)
116	Roberto Lavagna	Justicialist Party	27 April 2002 – 25 May 2003	Eduardo Duhalde
116	Roberto Lavagna	Justicialist Party	25 May 2003 – 27 November 2005	Néstor Kirchner
117	Felisa Miceli	Independent	28 November 2005 – 16 July 2007	Néstor Kirchner
118	Miguel Gustavo Peirano	Independent	17 July 2007 – 10 December 2007	Néstor Kirchner
119	Martín Lousteau	Independent	10 December 2007 – 24 April 2008	Cristina Fernández de Kirchner
Ministry of Economy and Public Finances (2008–2015)
120	Carlos Rafael Fernández	Justicialist Party	25 April 2008 – 7 July 2009	Cristina Fernández de Kirchner
121	Amado Boudou	Independent	7 July 2009 – 10 December 2011	Cristina Fernández de Kirchner
122	Hernán Lorenzino	Independent	10 December 2011 – 20 November 2013	Cristina Fernández de Kirchner
123	Axel Kicillof	Independent	20 November 2013 – 9 December 2015	Cristina Fernández de Kirchner
Ministry of the Treasury and Public Finances (2015–2016)
124	Alfonso Prat-Gay	Civic Coalition ARI	10 December 2015 – 31 December 2016	Mauricio Macri
Ministry of the Treasury (2016–2019)
125	Nicolás Dujovne	Radical Civic Union	1 January 2017 – 17 August 2019	Mauricio Macri
126	Hernán Lacunza	Republican Proposal	17 August 2019 – 10 December 2019	Mauricio Macri
Ministry of Economy (2019–Present)
127	Martín Guzmán	Independent	10 December 2019 – 2 July 2022	Alberto Fernández
128	Silvina Batakis	Justicialist Party	4 July 2022 – 3 August 2022 (Note: De facto until 28 July 2022)	Alberto Fernández
129	Sergio Massa	Renewal Front	3 August 2022 (Note: De facto since 28 July 2022) – 10 December 2023	Alberto Fernández
130	Luis Caputo	Republican Proposal/La Libertad Avanza (Note: Member of La Libertad Avanza since 2024)	10 December 2023 – Present	Javier Milei

== See also ==
- Argentina
- Economy of Argentina
