= Luis L. Domínguez =

Argentine politician, poet, historian, journalist and diplomat

Luis Lorenzo Domínguez
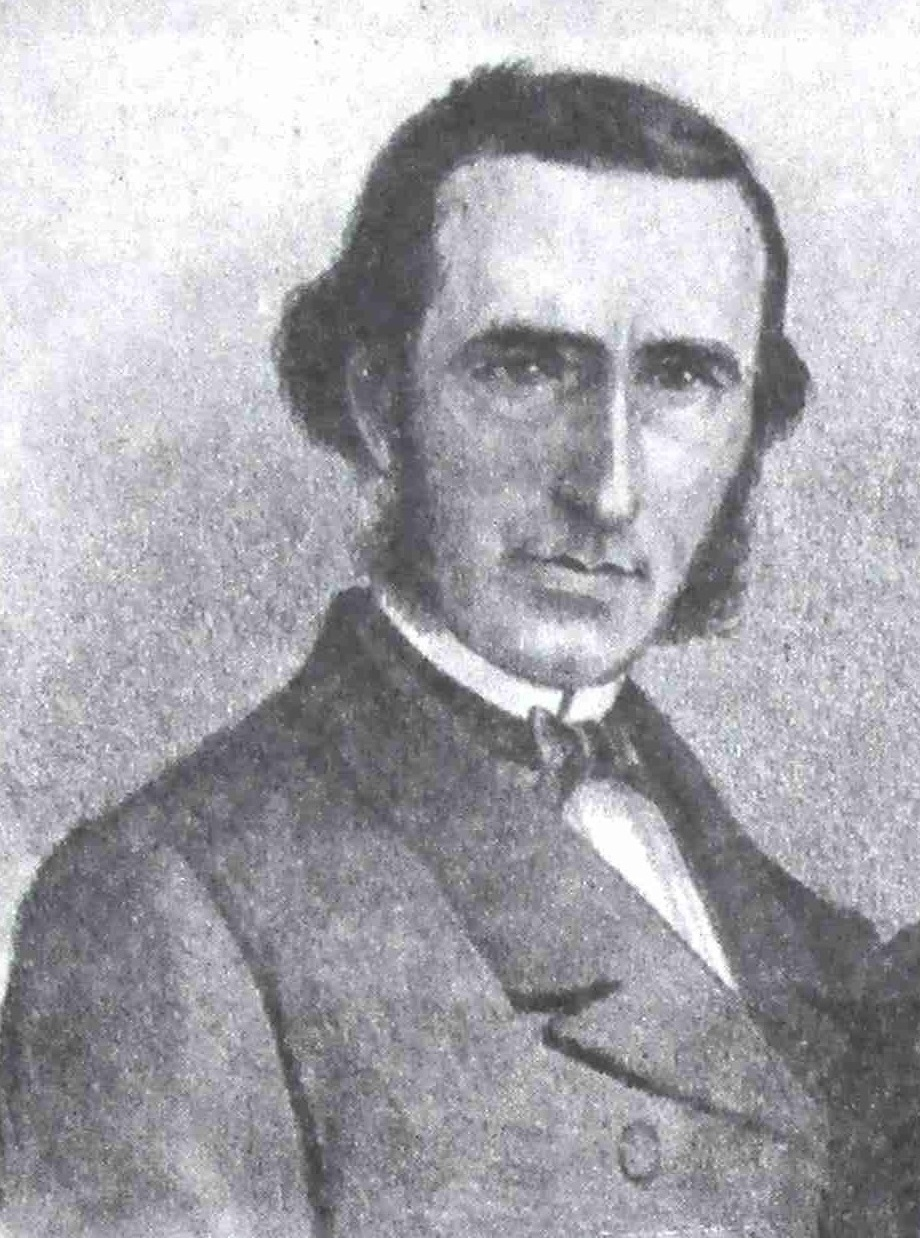
- Luis L. Domínguez.

Ministry of Economy and Public Finances (Argentina)
- In office October 13, 1870 – February 13, 1873
- Preceded by: es:José Benjamín Gorostiaga
- Succeeded by: Santiago Cortínez

Argentina ambassador to Brazil es:Anexo:Embajadores de Argentina en Brasil
- In office 1874–1874
- Preceded by: Wenceslau Romero
- Succeeded by: Jacinto Villegas

Argentina ambassador to United States es:Anexo:Embajadores de Argentina en Estados Unidos
- In office 1881–1881
- Preceded by: es:Bartolomé Mitre Vedia
- Succeeded by: Carlos Carranza

Argentina ambassador to United Kingdom es:Anexo:Embajadores de Argentina en el Reino Unido
- In office October 12, 1890 – July 20, 1898
- Preceded by: es:Manuel Rafael García Aguirre
- Succeeded by: es:Federico Álvarez de Toledo

Personal details
- Born: March 1, 1819 Buenos Aires
- Died: July 20, 1898 (aged 79) London

Luis Lorenzo Domínguez (1819–1898) was an Argentine politician, poet, historian, journalist and diplomat. In addition, he was the Minister for Economic Affairs for Argentina and served as an ambassador for Argentina to the United States and the United Kingdom and Spain.

He was born in Buenos Aires in March 1819 and died in London, in 1898. He functioned as the finance minister during the presidency of Domingo Faustino Sarmiento. He was nephew of Miguel Cané Andrade and cousin in first degree of Miguel Cané Casares.

== Early activism ==
In 1837 Domínguez was one of the founders and organizers of the Literary Salon. During that time he wrote his most famous poem, El Ombú.

In 1839 he took refuge in Montevideo along with other members of the Generación del 37 and supported, via the media, the French blockade and invasion of General Juan Lavalle, in the Buenos Aires province. He remained in Montevideo during the long siege that was imposed on former President Manuel Oribe, dedicate himself to the press. For a short time he was a military officer, but soon afterwards was appointed official of the ministry of war. In 1843 he won a literary contest with El Ombú, and by 1845 he wrote the Ode to Montevideo.

== Career ==
After the battle of Caseros Domínguez returned to Buenos Aires, where his participation in the press led to his being elected provincial representative. In June he opposed the San Nicolas Agreement. Some time later he was elected deputy to the constituent congress of Santa Fé, which - due to the revolution of September 11, 1852 - was not incorporated. Instead, he was one of the authors of the constitution of the separatist state of Buenos Aires.

He was a civil servant and journalist during the period of the divided republic, and ambassador to several countries in Europe. In 1856 he was editor of the newspaper El Orden, together with Felix Frias. Three years later he was sent to Parana to demand the repeal of the "law of differential rights" with which the Argentina Confederacy was to defend the economic absorption on the part of Buenos Aires. In 1860 he was a member of the Buenos Aires convention which proposed amendments to the Constitution.

The following year he wrote a History of Argentina - strongly biased against federalism, which he completed in 1820 - and which, for a long time was the official textbook for teaching national history in the country.

== Political career ==
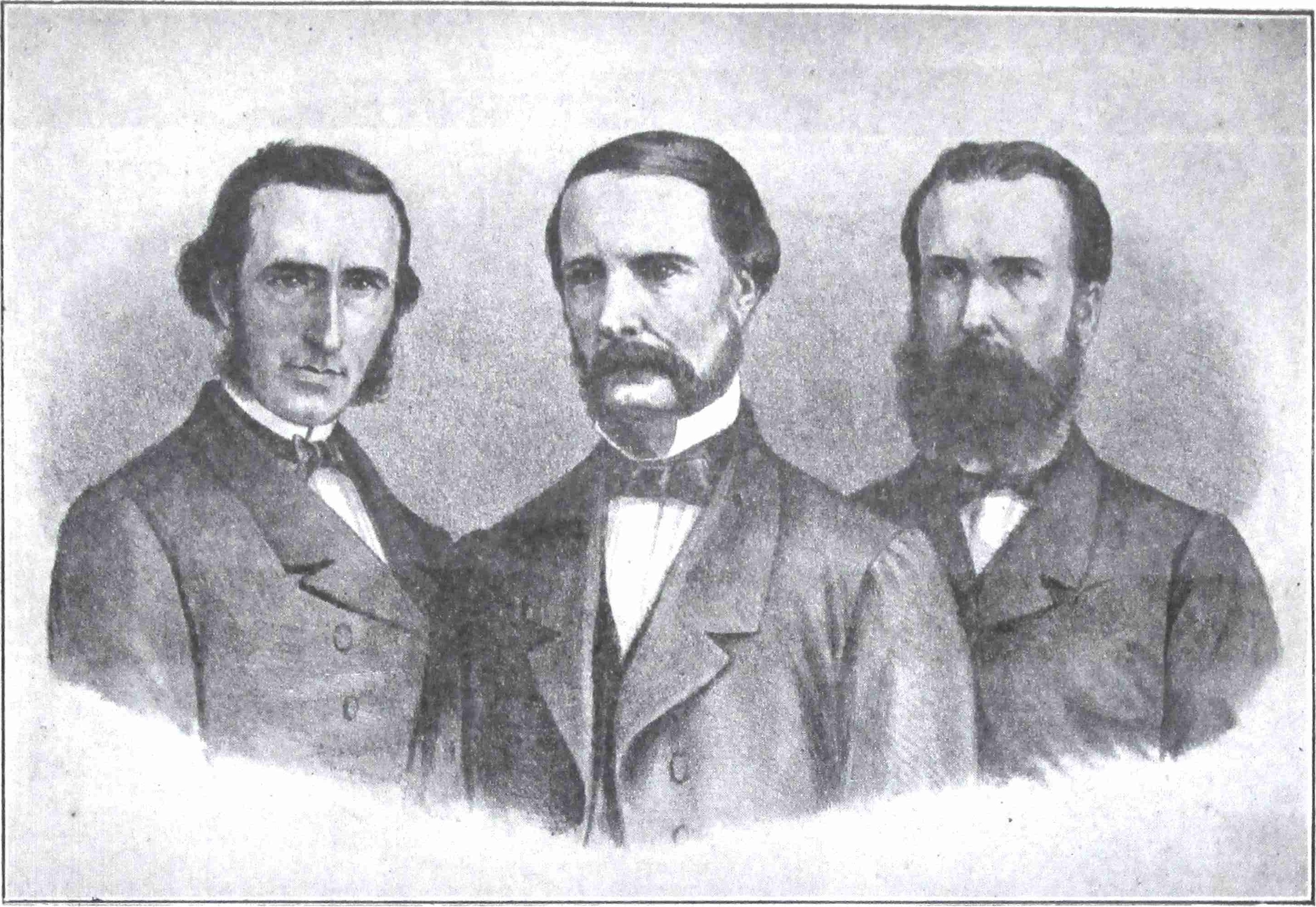
Government of Buenos Aires Province: D. Luis L. Domínguez (Minister for Economic Affairs), D. Mariano Saavedra (Governor) e Doc. Pablo Cardenas (Minister of the government).

After the battle of Pavón, he was secretary to General Bartolomé Mitre and finance minister of the Buenos Aires governor Mariano Saavedra. He joined the Autonomist Party of Adolfo Alsina and accompanied him in his administration as governor of Buenos Aires. He was Member of Parliament and member of the convention for the reformation of the Constitution.

His campaign for the presidential candidacy of Domingo Faustino Sarmiento in Buenos Aires was unsuccessful, but he still earned the President's appreciation, who appointed him as finance minister. The economy of his day was marked by the problems of the Paraguay War and the civil war, so the overall economic situation was not favorable. Moreover, his economic ideas were of a free trade doctrine which was strongly criticized as simply applying imported recipes, little suited to the situation in Argentina at that time. The crisis that began with Sarmiento became worse, and would end up exploding in the government of Nicolas Avellaneda. When he left office he was appointed financial representative in London. In that city he rewrote his History of Argentina, which was disseminated in the academic English community as the first full history of Argentina translated into that language.

In 1873 he was provincial constitutional standard, and was later ambassador to Peru, Brazil, USA and finally England, during the administrations of Avellaneda, Roca and Celman.

The British Library holds the Domínguez Collection, a collection of nineteenth-century political pamphlets. The collection also contains the work of Lorenzo Lopez (died 1833).
