= Miguel Ángel Roig =

Argentine economist

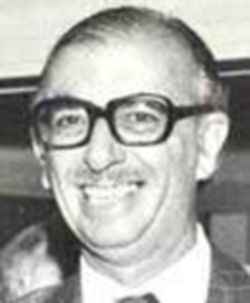

Minister of Economy of Argentina
- In office 9 July 1989 – 14 July 1989
- President: Carlos Saúl Menem
- Preceded by: Jesús Rodríguez
- Succeeded by: Néstor Mario Rapanelli

Personal details
- Born: 25 June 1921 Argentina
- Died: 14 July 1989 (aged 68) Buenos Aires, Argentina

Miguel Ángel Roig (born 25 June 1921 – 14 July 1989) was an Argentine economist.

He served as Minister of Economy of Argentina for a six days until his death at the beginning of Carlos Menem presidency in 1989.
