= Martín Guzmán =

Argentine economist (born 1982)

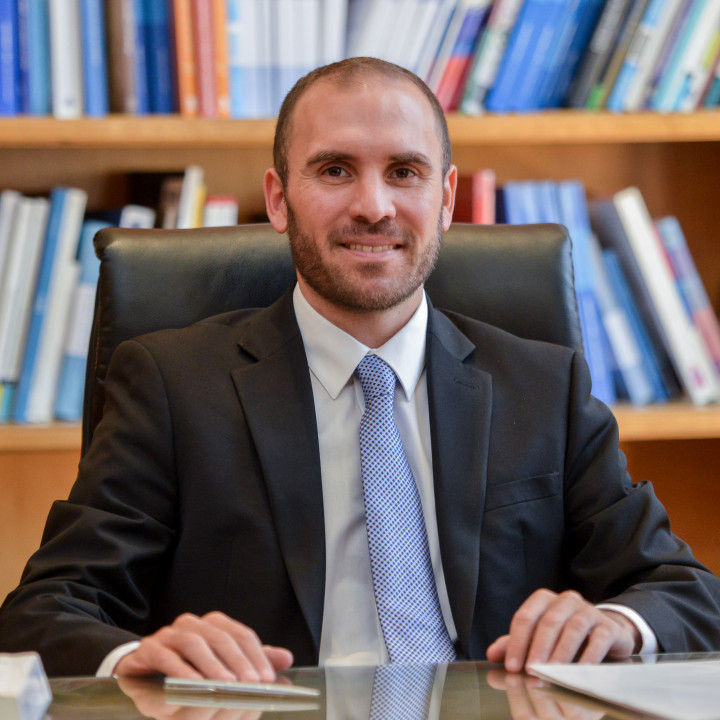

Minister of Economy
- In office 10 December 2019 – 2 July 2022
- President: Alberto Fernández
- Preceded by: Hernán Lacunza (as Minister of the Treasury)
- Succeeded by: Silvina Batakis

Personal details
- Born: 12 October 1982 (age 44) La Plata, Argentina
- Party: Independent; Frente de Todos (2019–2022)
- Education: National University of La Plata; Brown University (PhD)

Academic background
- Thesis: Understanding the Causes and Effects of Financial Crises (2013)
- Doctoral advisor: Peter Howitt

Academic work
- Institutions: University of Buenos Aires; Columbia University

Martín Maximiliano Guzmán (Spanish pronunciation: [maɾˈtim maksimiˈljano ɣuzˈman]; born 12 October 1982) is an Argentine economist, who served as Minister of Economy in the cabinet of President Alberto Fernández from December 2019 to July 2022.

== Early life and education ==
Guzmán was born in 1982 in La Plata, Buenos Aires Province. Guzmán studied at the National University of La Plata, where he graduated with a degree of Licenciate in Economics in 2005, then going on to receive a Master of Science in Economics in 2007. In 2013 he earned a doctorate on Economics from Brown University, where he was supervised by Peter Howitt. His theoretical influences include Carlos Daniel Heymann and Joseph Stiglitz.

== Academics ==
From 2017 to 2022, Guzmán was an associate professor at University of Buenos Aires. At the Columbia Business School, Guzmán is an Associate Research Scholar at the Economics Division, director of Columbia University Initiative for Policy Dialogue's Debt Restructuring Program and editor-in-chief of the Journal of Globalization and Development, specializing on the fields of public debt, international macroeconomics and monetary economics.

On 27 November 2021, Pope Francis named Guzmán a numbered member of the Pontifical Academy of Social Sciences.

== Minister of Economy ==
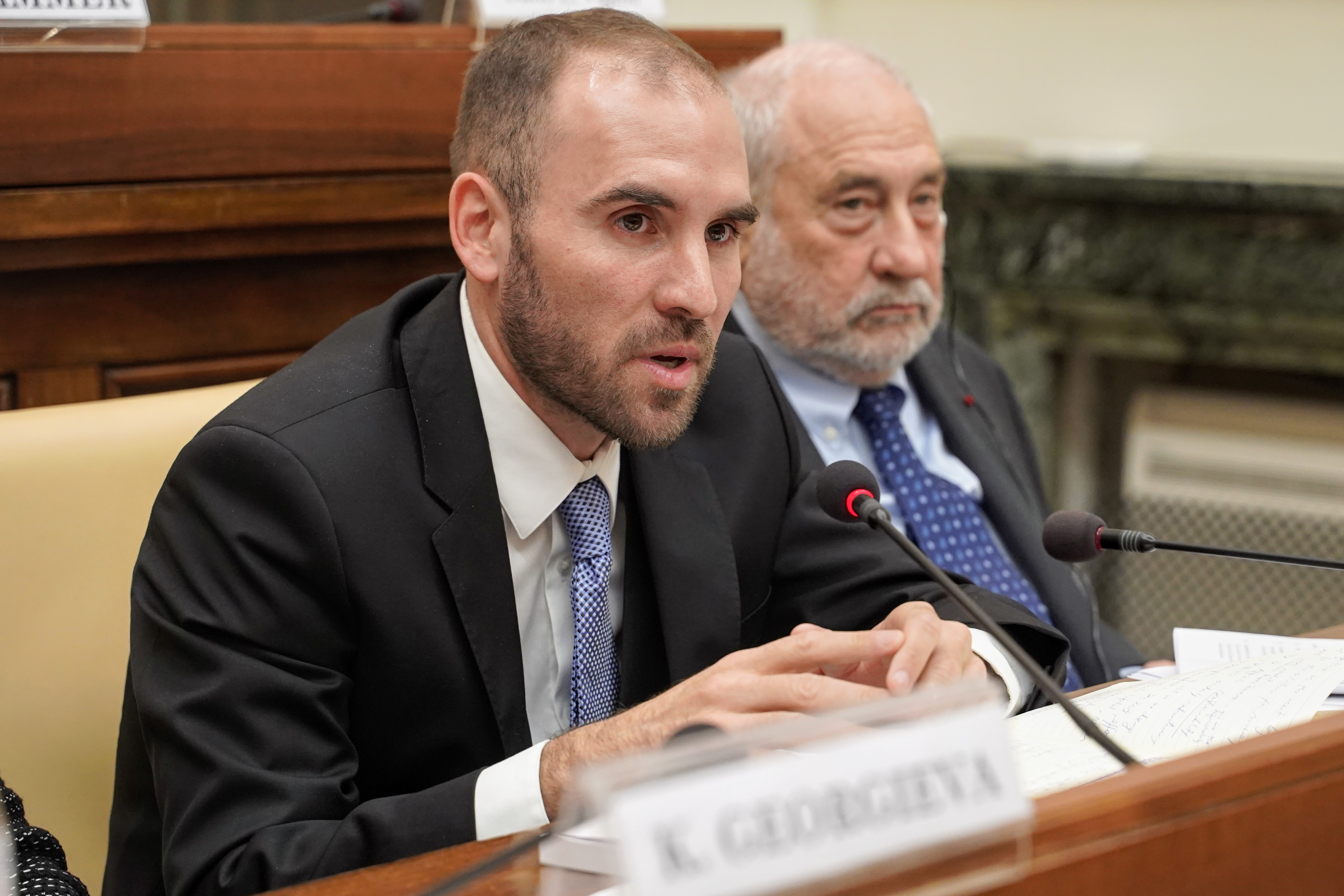
Guzmán with Joseph Stiglitz, February 2020.

His first legislative initiative, the Social Solidarity and Productive Recovery Bill, was passed by Congress on 23 December.

The bill included tax hikes on foreign currency purchases, agricultural exports, wealth, and car sales - as well as tax incentives for production. Amid the worst recession in nearly two decades, it provided a 180-day freeze on utility rates, bonuses for the nation's retirees and Universal Allocation per Child beneficiaries, and food cards to two million of Argentina's poorest families.

It also gave the president additional powers to renegotiate debt terms – with Argentina seeking to restructure its US$100 billion debt with private bondholders and US$45 billion borrowed by Mauricio Macri administration from the International Monetary Fund (IMF).

The IMF reported that the COVID-19 crisis would plunge Argentina's GDP by 9.9%. Unemployment jumped from 8.9% in late 2019 to 13.1% in the second quarter of 2020 (the highest since 2004), at the height of the Covid-related lockdown - but eased steadily afterwards, to 7% by late 2021.

On 4 August 2020, Guzmán reached an accord with the biggest creditors on terms for a restructuring of $65 billion in foreign bonds, after a breakthrough in talks that had at times looked close to collapse since the country's ninth debt default in May. The country's public foreign debt, which had nearly doubled during the Macri administration, slimmed from $197 billion in late 2019 to $191 billion in late 2021.

Under Guzmán, Argentina also refinanced a record, $45 billion IMF bailout debt inherited from the Macri administration - and saw 10.4% growth in 2021 and 5.7% in January–April 2022, after three years of deep recession. Inflation, however, remained stubbornly high - initially slowing from 54% in 2019 to 36% in 2020; but rising to over 60% by May 2022.

On 2 July 2022, following depreciation of the peso and shortages of diesel fuel, and amid pressure from the left wing of the governing coalition, Guzmán resigned as Minister of Economy.

Political offices
Preceded by Hernán Lacunza	Minister of Economy; 2019–2022	Succeeded by Silvina Batakis
