= Aldo Ferrer =

Argentine economist (1927–2016)

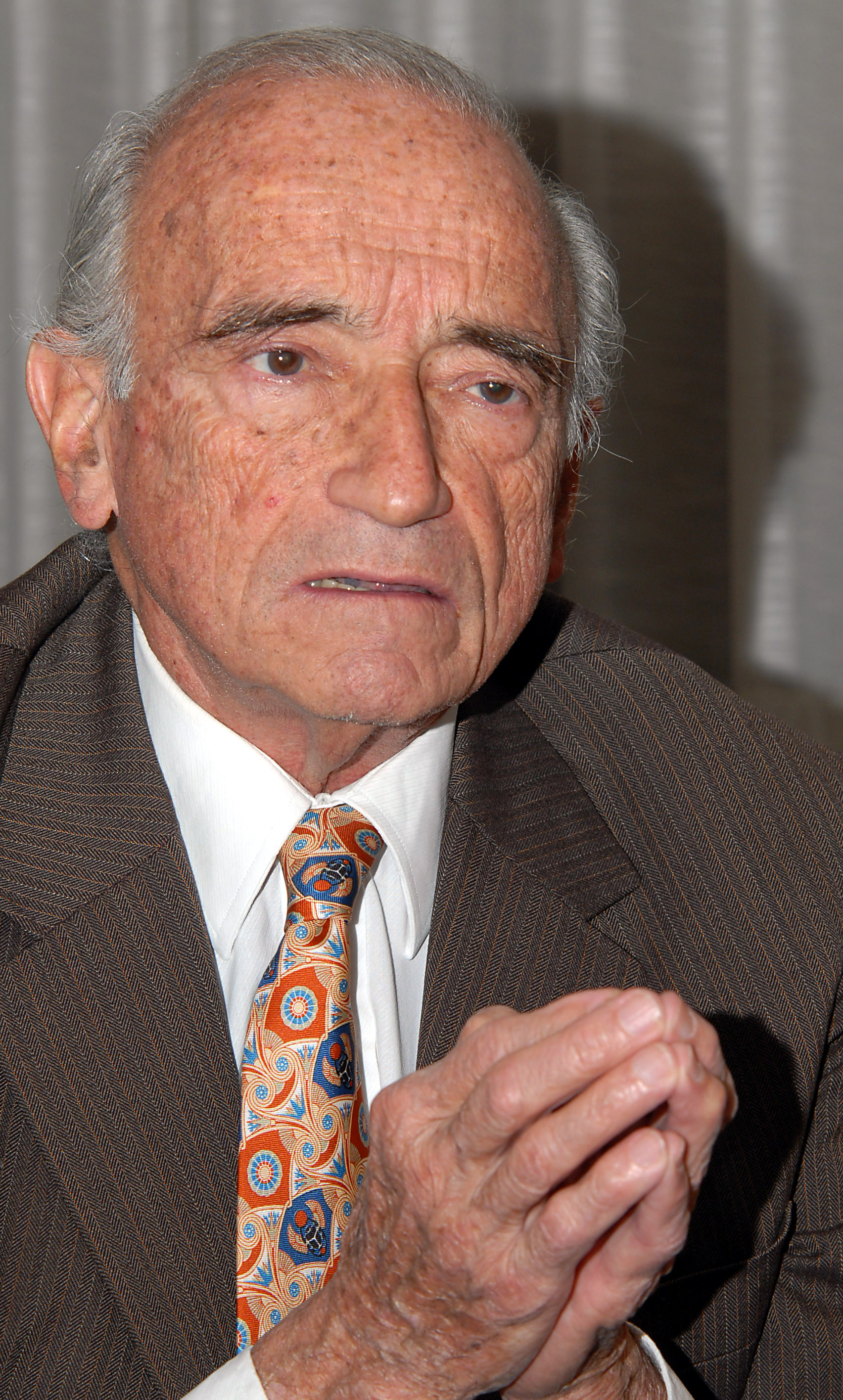

Ambassador of Argentina to France
- In office February 3, 2011 – April 18, 2013
- President: Cristina Fernández de Kirchner
- Preceded by: Luis Ureta Sáenz Peña
- Succeeded by: María del Carmen Squeff

President of the Bank of the Province of Buenos Aires
- In office December 22, 1983 – December 18, 1987
- Preceded by: Arnaldo Cisilino
- Succeeded by: Eduardo Amadeo

Minister of Economy of Argentina
- In office October 26, 1970 – May 28, 1971
- President: Roberto Levingston
- Preceded by: Carlos Moyano Llerena
- Succeeded by: Juan Quillici

Personal details
- Born: April 15, 1927 Buenos Aires, Argentina
- Died: March 8, 2016 (aged 88)
- Party: Radical Civic Union
- Education: University of Buenos Aires

Aldo Ferrer (April 15, 1927 – March 8, 2016) was an Argentine economist. A member of the Radical Civic Union, he was the Minister of Economy of Argentina and the Ambassador of Argentina to France. He was one of the leading proponents of economic nationalism in Argentina.

== Early life and early career ==
Ferrer was born on April 15, 1927, in Buenos Aires. He studied at the University of Buenos Aires School of Economics, where he received a Doctorate in 1953. He served as adviser to the United Nations Secretariat as a doctoral student under Professor Raúl Prebisch, and his thesis, The State and Economic Development, earned him early repute as a defender of industrial protectionism.

== Politics ==
Ferrer was named economic policy attaché to the Argentine Embassy in London in 1956 and in 1957 co-founded the Argentine Association of Political Economy. Following the progressive UCRI's victory at the polls in 1958, Governor Oscar Alende, named Ferrer Minister of the Economy, from which Ferrer promoted increased spending in infrastructure and needed flood management works, for example.

His turn as chief economist for Argentina's largest province (home to over a third of the population) gave Ferrer national stature, though it also left him out of the halls of power after the UCRI's standard-bearer, President Arturo Frondizi, was forced to resign by conservative opponents in 1962.

== Academics ==
Ferrer returned to academics as Professor of Economics at the National University of La Plata and at the University of Buenos Aires. In this capacity, he created a new, fourth edition of the well-known textbook, The Argentine Economy (translated into English at the University of California, Berkeley in 1967). Appointed a committee-member in U.S. President John F. Kennedy's Alliance for Progress, he was also invited as a founding member of the Latin American Social Science Council (CLACSO), a non-governmental organization created in 1967 in a consultative capacity to UNESCO.

== Minister of Economy ==
Growing instability in Argentina led to the removal of General Juan Carlos Onganía as president in June 1970. His replacement, General Roberto Marcelo Levingston, had become a supporter of the Alliance for Progress during his turn in the Frondizi administration as head of Army Intelligence and while stationed in the Argentine Embassy in Washington, D.C.. Careful to placate conservatives, he appointed an "inflation hawk," Carlos Moyano Llerena, as Minister of the Economy; but, instead relied on the head of the new Ministry of Production, Aldo Ferrer, as his chief economic policy maker. Announcing new subsidies for industry, requirements for a higher domestic component in autos and other large consumer durables and the creation of a national small-business lender (BANADE), Ferrer secured increased collective bargaining rights for Argentine labor (the best-paid and most-unionized in Latin America at the time) and became a household word in Argentina with his ads encouraging consumers to Compre Nacional! ("Buy Domestic").

Having entered a mild recession following a boom in 1968–69, growth reaccelerated in late 1970 and early 1971, despite the worst drought since 1952. Ferrer presented President Levingston a five-year plan in September in the hope of giving his new program a permanence seldom seem in Argentine policy and it earned him appointment as full Minister of the Economy in October, as well as the support of former President Arturo Frondizi and of economist Rogelio Julio Frigerio, a pro-development businessman close to Frondizi. Levingston's political designs, the most controversial of which was to be the replacement of Argentina's myriad political parties with four Presidentially-sanctioned alliances, led to his replacement in March 1971. Ferrer was initially retained by the new president, Alejandro Agustín Lanusse. Ferrer's efforts to discourage speculative practices entrenched in Argentine farming such as hoarding and underproduction drew opposition from the powerful beef and grain lobbies, however, and the latter responded by forming an advocacy group, the United Farmland Movement (MCU); these pressure groups helped lead to the Economy Minister's dismissal in late May.

== Later career ==
Ferrer returned to academics and to his work with CLACSO, writing an economic history, The Postwar (1982), and Living Within Our Means (1983), an appeal for alternatives to dependence on foreign investment. Following a financial collapse, Argentina's last dictatorship called for elections in 1983. The winner, Raúl Alfonsín of the centrist Radical Civic Union (UCR), appointed Ferrer President of the Bank of the Province of Buenos Aires, the public, second-largest bank in Argentina. Limited by a shortfall in confidence in the Argentine banking system (whose deposits were dwarfed by Argentine deposits abroad) and growing differences with Alfonsín's conservative economists, Ferrer resigned in 1987.

Contributing regularly to the Economy section of Clarín, Argentina's most important news daily, he became an increasingly renowned opponent of globalization, capturing what he saw as its contradictions in A History of Globalization in 1996, and criticizing its dependence on slave labor in From Columbus to the Internet: Globalization in Latin America (2000). He organized like-minded economists in his new NGO, Grupo Fénix the same year.

The May 2003 election of Peronist Néstor Kirchner following the worst economic debacle in Argentina since 1930 left free market and pro-globalization economists without the friends in Argentine government they had enjoyed for over a decade, leading to increasing state intervention in the Argentine economy. Among the results was the 2004 establishment of Enarsa, a public energy company commissioned to increase oil and gas production and to alleviate future electricity shortages such as the one Argentina suffered in April of that year. He was appointed to the company's Board of Directors in March 2006.

Ferrer was named editor-in-chief of Buenos Aires Económico, a local business and current affairs daily, in 2008, and in December 2010, was appointed Ambassador to France by President Cristina Kirchner. Popular with embassy staff and the sizable community of Argentines in France alike, Ferrer's tenure became known for its gala diplomacy and frequent colloquia of economists. Citing health concerns and a desire to be closer to his daughters in Argentina, he resigned from the post in April 2013 and returned to academia. He died on March 8, 2016.
