= Néstor Mario Rapanelli =

Argentine economist (1929–2021)

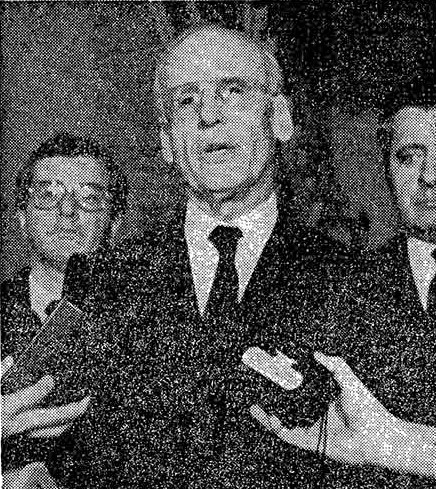
Néstor Mario Rapanelli, 1989

Néstor Mario Rapanelli (April 23, 1929 – February 23, 2021) was an Argentine economist, businessman (Bunge & Born), and politician. He served as Minister of Economy in 1989. He was born and died in Buenos Aires.
