= Argentine Association of Political Economy =

Argentinian scientific society on economics

The Argentine Association of Political Economy (Castilian: Asociación Argentina de Economía Política - AAEP) is a non-profit scientific society that brings together experts in Economics from the Republic of Argentina and the world, based in Buenos Aires. Its main objectives are "Promoting economic analysis in the country for the advancement of science" by means of improvement and professional development in several fields of economics and social sciences. It was founded in 1957 as a scientific society to promote research and study of the economic sciences and improve social welfare. Yearly meetings are held annually to disseminate scientific advances and various aspects of the economy.

== History ==
The AAEP was founded by professors in economics or law Aldo Ferrer, Roberto Alemann, July Broide, Benjamin Cornejo, John J. Guaresti (h), Charles C. Helbling, Carlos Moyano Llerena, Julio H. G. Olivera, Federico Pinedo (f.), Oreste Popescu, Ovid Schiopetto, Francisco Valsecchi, the engineer Francisco Garcia Olano and the journalist John E. Alemann. The origins of the AAEP invitations back to Drs. Jöhr Adolph and Louis Baudin, in the mid-1950s, the Oreste Popescu and Julius H. G. Olivera. Jöhr and Baudin, then belonging to the International Economic Association, suggested constitute a representative association of researchers in political economy. Popescu initiatives and Olivera were crystallized on 26 September 1957, with the decision to create the AAEP. Olivera carried out the execution of the foundation, which formally took place on 18 November of the same period.

== Annual meetings and eminent economist ==
A major activity of the AAEP is holding an annual meeting for discussion of works in the field of economics, both partners as non-members, which traditionally marks the month of November of each cycle in different cities, in consultation and cooperation with universities and economic research centers in Argentina, Latin América and the world. Since 1964, the AAEP has conducted 41 annual meetings. They have already been presented and discussed within a framework of complete academic freedom, more than two thousand research papers. The papers presented at each annual meeting are published in the Annals of the Association of Political Economy, Argentina. These meetings have included economists in the country and guests from other countries, including prestigious foreign economists like Albert Berry, Jan K. Brueckner, M. Bruno, V. Corbo, Jacques Drèze, Stanley Fisher, R. Guesnerie, A. C. Harberger, H. Houthakker, Paul Klemperer, Finn Kydland, J. J. Laffont, A. Leijonhufvud, Stan Metcalfe, J. Mirrlees, F. Modigliani, M. Nerlove, L. Pasinetti, S. Rosen, P. Spiller, J. Tobin, W. Oates, V. Volsky, E. Prescott, and T. N. Srinivasan.

== See also ==
- Political economy
- Science and technology in Argentina
