= Jorge Wehbe =

Argentine lawyer and economist

Florentino Jorge Wehbe (1920 – November 4, 1998) was an Argentine lawyer and economist who served as Minister of Economy of Argentina for one year. He was a member of the Intransigent Radical Civic Union.

== Minister of Economy ==
Wehbe was director at the Bank of the Province of Buenos Aires in 1955. He was Minister of Economy (August 25, 1982 – December 10, 1983) during the presidency of General Reynaldo Bignone.

His most notable achievement was negotiating the debt of Argentina, during which he made numerous trips to the United States. On September 13, 1982, Economy Minister Jorge Wehbe launched a "price controls" that "put the products of 675 companies under government control" due to "the need to "protect real wages," threatened by a "monopolistic industrial structure."
