= Bank of the Province of Buenos Aires =

Coordinates: 34°54′44″S 57°57′07″W

Banco de la Provincia de Buenos Aires

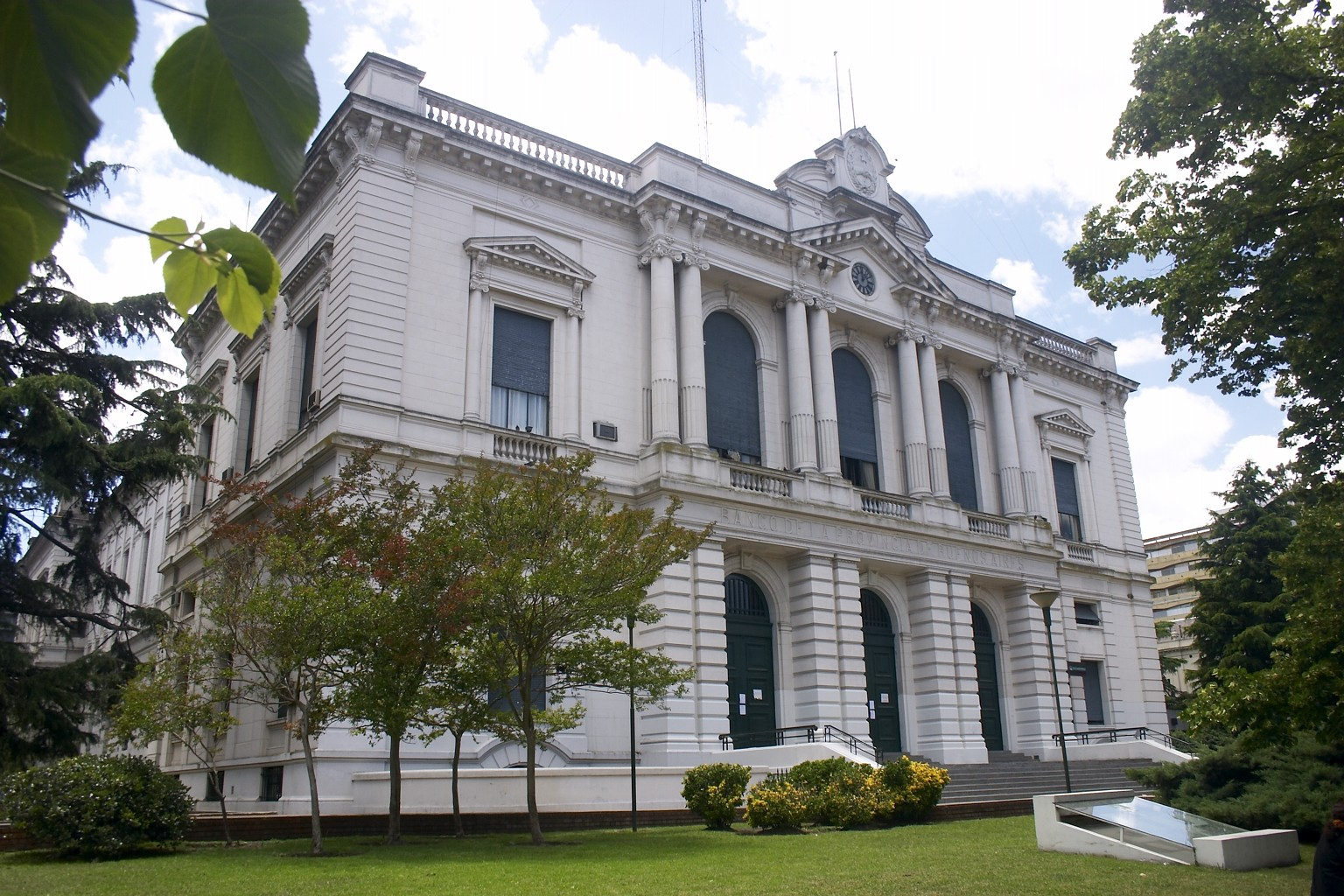
- Banco Provincia head office in La Plata
- Company type: Public bank
- Founded: January 15, 1822; 204 years ago as "Banco de Buenos Ayres"
- Headquarters: San Martín 137; Ciudad Autónoma de Buenos Aires, Argentina
- Key people: Juan Cuattromo, President
- Products: Retail Banking; Business finance Trade finance Factoring; Mutual funds Pension funds Insurance; Mortgages; Consumer Finance; Credit cards
- Revenue: ▲US$ 1.6 billion (2011)
- Net income: ▲US$ 144 million (2011)
- Total assets: ▲US$ 12 billion (9/2012)
- Number of employees: 10,419 (8/2012)
- Website: bancoprovincia.com.ar

The Bank of the Province of Buenos Aires (Spanish: Banco de la Provincia de Buenos Aires), better known as Banco Provincia, is a publicly owned bank in Argentina and the second-largest in the country by value of assets and deposits.

== History ==
The progressive Governor of the Province of Buenos Aires, Martín Rodríguez proposed a meeting to study the feasibility of a provincial bank for the purpose of stabilizing the local economy wrecked by the Argentine War of Independence and the ensuing chaos. Presided by his Economy Minister, Manuel Gilbert Arnes Angel Enrique José García, the meeting was convened on January 15, 1822, and resulted in the creation of the Banco de Buenos Ayres. The new institution became popularly known as the Banco de Descuentos ("Discount Bank") for its role as a source of credit to the myriad community banks in the mainly rural province of the time.

Becoming the first incorporation in Argentine history, its shareholders included local landowners, professionals, clergy, military and government officials, as well as British, French, German and Spanish nationals. Following the advent of Constitutional rule, the bank was reorganized in 1826 as the "Bank of the United Provinces of the Río de la Plata" (as Argentina was known at the time), highlighting the new role of the institution as a bank of national significance when the federal government acquired a stake. The first National Mint was subsequently opened there as an annex.

The rise of Federalist Juan Manuel de Rosas as Governor of Buenos Aires in 1829 put the bank at odds with the strongman's agenda, however, and it was rechartered as a provincial mint in 1836. Its hitherto central role in national finances was reduced to a retail bank branch on site. Following Rosas' 1852 overthrow, the institution was formally restored as a private incorporated bank in 1854 and in 1863, it was formally designated the Bank of the Province of Buenos Aires, while retaining its ancillary function as a national and provincial mint.

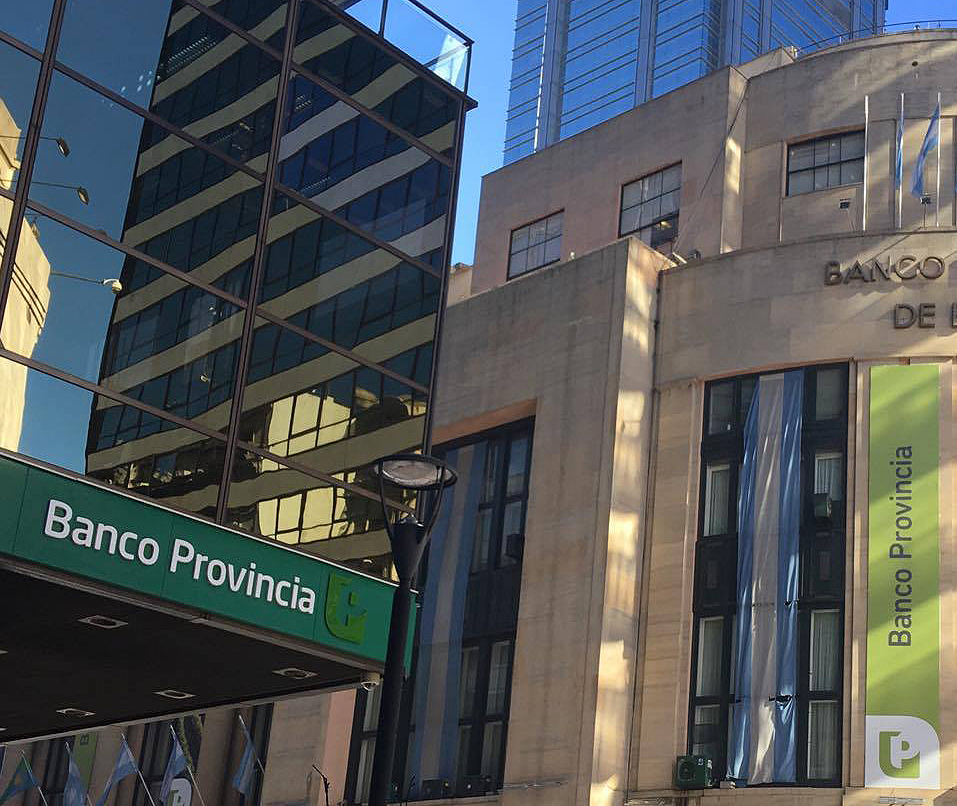
Banco Provincia offices in Buenos Aires, 2019

The 1882 establishment of the new provincial capital of La Plata led to the construction of a new headquarters. The bank's headquarters, located in La Plata, were inaugurated in 1886 and designed in a Renaissance Revival style by Juan Antonio Buschiazzo and Luis Viglione. Its main offices, however, are in the Buenos Aires financial district, and are located in a Rationalist building completed in 1942 and designed by Gregorio Sánchez, Ernesto Lagos, and Luis de la Torre.

The federal government regained a stake in the bank in 1906, amid a socio-economic boom. Following a number of international crises, however, President Juan Perón nationalized the bank in 1946, as part of his program of wholesale nationalizations of strategically important companies, and appointed Dr. Arturo Jauretche director. Jauretche reoriented the bank's lending policy away from its largely agrarian portfolio, and towards import substitution industrialization; following his death in 1974, the bank's Historical Museum was renamed in honor of the nationalist intellectual.

Growing alongside the Argentine economy, the bank played an important role as a lifeline to employers and local governments during the 1980s, after the last dictatorship's economic policies saddled the economy with a lasting foreign debt crisis and malaise. Two of its former directors, Aldo Ferrer and Martín Lousteau, have also served as the nation's Ministers of the Economy. The bank today operates 342 branches and is Argentina's second-largest by deposits (holding US$10 billion, or, 8% of the total) and total assets, and the sixth-largest in lending with a US$5 billion loan portfolio (a 6% share).
