= Integration and Development Movement =

Integration and Development Movement Movimiento de Integración y Desarrollo
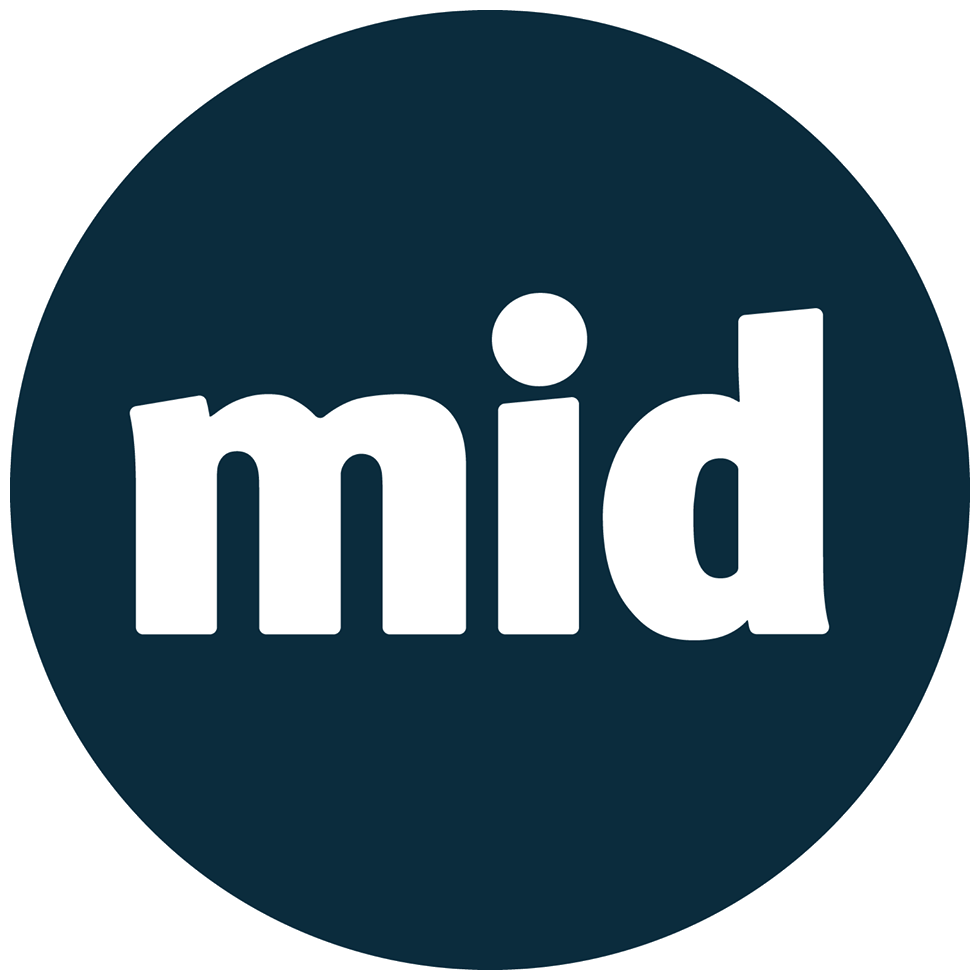
- Abbreviation: MID
- President: Juan Pablo Carrique
- General Secretary: Sebastián Ruiz
- Founder(s): Arturo Frondizi; Rogelio Julio Frigerio
- Leader: Oscar Zago
- Founded: 1963
- Split from: Intransigent Radical Civic Union
- Headquarters: Ayacucho 49, Buenos Aires
- Membership (2016): 41,182
- Ideology: Developmentalism; Historical: Orthodox Peronism
- Political position: Far-right; Factions: Centre-right to right-wing
- National affiliation: La Libertad Avanza
- Colours: Dark blue
- Seats in the Senate: 0 / 72
- Seats in the Chamber of Deputies: 3 / 257
- Province Governors: 0 / 24

Website
- www.mid.org.ar

The Integration and Development Movement (Spanish: Movimiento de Integración y Desarrollo, MID) is a developmentalist political party founded by Arturo Frondizi in Argentina. It is a member of La Libertad Avanza.

== History ==
=== Background ===
Old logo for the party

Flying to Caracas, Venezuela, in 1956, Argentine wholesaler and publisher Rogelio Julio Frigerio secretly negotiated an agreement between his friend, the centrist UCR's 1951 vice-presidential nominee Arturo Frondizi, and exiled populist leader Juan Perón. The arrangement provided the banned Peronists a voice in government in exchange for their support. The pact, a mere rumor at the time, created a rift within the UCR at their party convention in November 1956, forcing Frondizi and his supporters to run on a splinter (UCRI) ticket and leaving more anti-Peronist UCR voters with Ricardo Balbín, the party's 1951 standard bearer. Balbín was dealt a "February surprise" when, four days before the election, the exiled leader publicly endorsed Frondizi. Blank votes (Peronist voters' choice during the assembly elections of 1957, which they narrowly "won") became Frondizi votes, making him the winner of the 1958 elections.

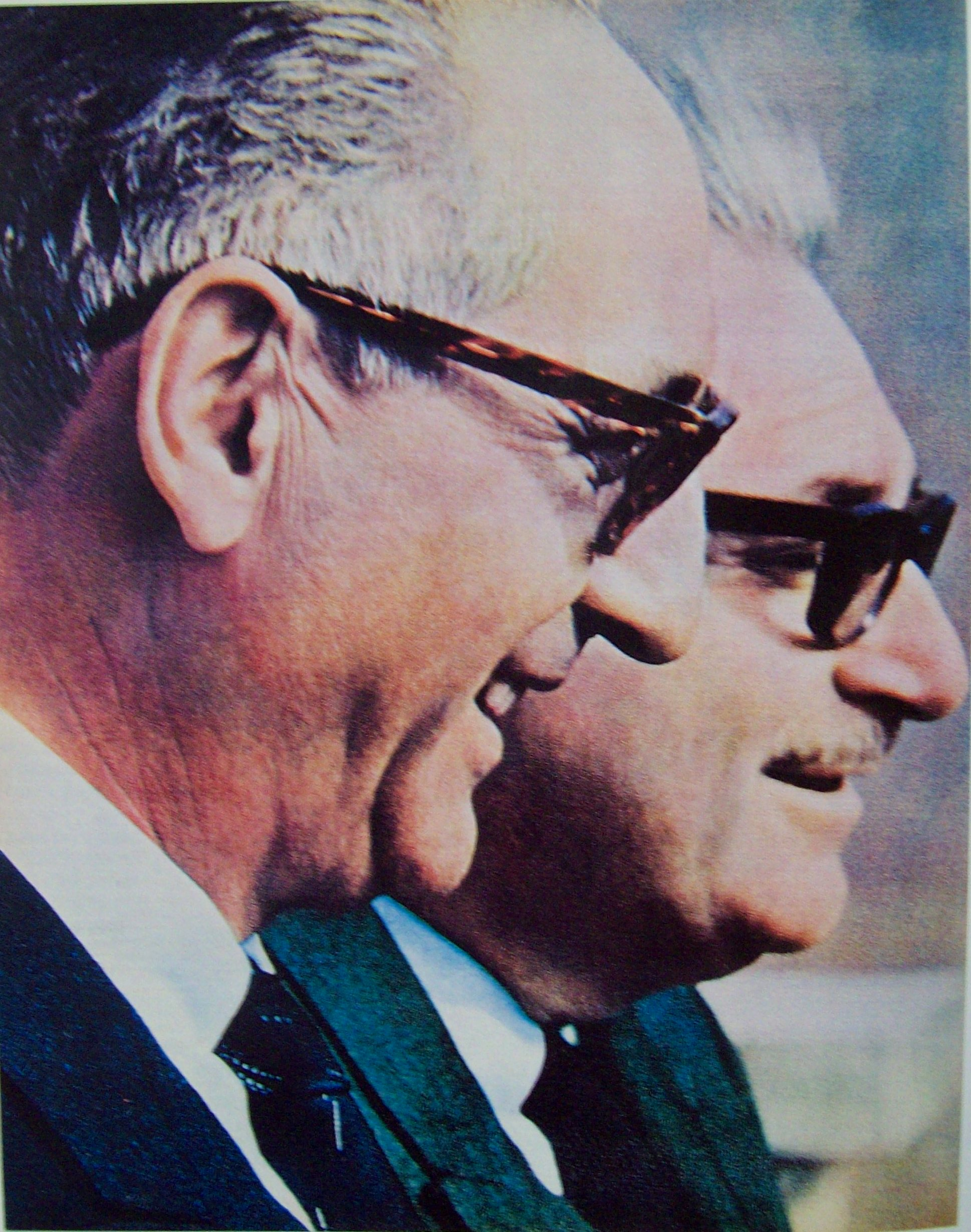
The founders of the MID, former President Arturo Frondizi and chief economic adviser, Rogelio Frigerio.

President Frondizi designated Frigerio Secretary of Socio-Economic Affairs, a secondary post in the critical Economics Ministry the new president was forced to offer Frigerio due to steadfast opposition from the Argentine military; Frigerio was given informal say over a broad swath of economic policy, however. They inherited a difficult economic situation: declining exports and a growing need for costly imported motor vehicles, machinery and fuel, moreover, had caused Argentina to run trade deficits in seven out the past ten years. Unable to finance these easily, Frondizi's predecessors had resorted to "printing" money to cover the nation's yawning current account deficits, causing prices to rise around sixfold. Frigerio drafted the Law of Foreign Investment, which gave incentives and tax benefits to both local and foreign corporations willing to develop Argentina's energy and industry sectors, as well as giving foreign investors more legal recourse. Frigerio's plans also called for expanded public lending for homebuilders and local industry, public works investments and large petroleum exploration and drilling contracts with foreign oil companies. These investments helped make the Argentine economy nearly self-sufficient in its growing energy and industry needs and helped shape national policy even after Frondizi's forced resignation in 1962.

=== Foundation and early years ===
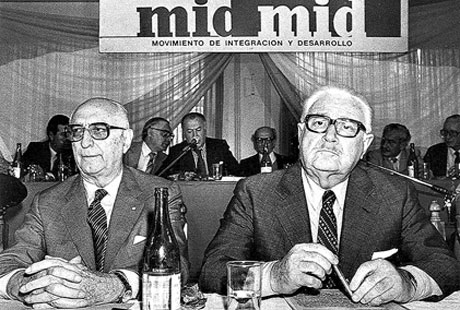
Frondizi and Frigerio chair a MID convention during the 1983 elections. The party fared poorly, and in later years joined coalitions.

Frigerio and Frondizi founded the Movement for Integration and Development (MID) on a developmentalist platform, ahead of the 1963 elections. Unable to field candidates due to military and conservative opposition, the MID and Perón agreed on a "National Popular Front." The alliance was again scuttled by military pressure, and the MID endorsed a "blank vote" option. Those among Frondizi's former allies who objected to this move backed progressive Buenos Aires Province Governor Oscar Alende, who ran on the UCRI ticket (its last) and finished second; this group later established the Intransigent Party. Following the pragmatic Arturo Illia's election, the MID was allowed to participate in the 1965 legislative elections, sending 16 members to the Argentine Chamber of Deputies. Policy differences over Frondizi-era oil contracts, which Illia rescinded, led the MID to actively oppose him, however. Frigerio became a significant shareholder in Argentina's largest news daily, Clarín, following a 1971 deal made with the news daily's owner, Ernestina Herrera de Noble, whose late husband (Clarín founder Roberto Noble), had supported Frondizi.

Perón's return from exile imminent, the MID opted to endorse the aging leader's ticket for the 1973 elections and following seven years of military rule, the reopened Argentine Congress included 12 MID Deputies. Given little say by the new Peronist government, which, instead saw its policy shift from populism to erratic crisis management measures, Frigerio initially supported the 1976 coup against Perón's successor (his hapless widow, Isabel Perón). Freezing wages for prolonged stretches, deregulating financial markets and encouraging a flood of foreign debt and of imports, the dictatorship's policies helped undo much of what Frondizi and Frigerio had installed twenty years earlier. This led the MID to abandon its early support for the regime and particularly for its chief economist, José Alfredo Martínez de Hoz, leading to threats against numerous MID figures.

=== End of dictatorship and present days ===
Allowing elections in 1983, the dictatorship left an insolvent Argentina, its business and consumer confidence almost shattered and its international prestige damaged following the 1982 Falklands War, an invasion Frigerio opposed. Taking up the MID's nomination for president in his first campaign for high office, Frigerio, however, refused to condemn the regime's human rights atrocities, something which deprived his longshot 1983 MID candidacy of needed support. Frigerio fared poorly on election night, garnering 4th place (1.5%) and electing no congressmen.

Elected by an ample margin, UCR leader Raúl Alfonsín left Frigerio out of the economic policy discussions he held before taking office. Frigerio succeeded the ailing Frondizi (earlier diagnosed with Parkinson's disease) as President of the MID in 1986. The MID maintained a considerable following in a number of Argentine provinces, such as in Formosa Province, where voters had fond memories of the Frondizi administration's development projects. Frigerio leveraged this influence there into an agreement with Justicialist Party (Peronist) Governor Floro Bogado for his support of developmentalist policies and a MID candidate for Congress in exchange for the MID's alliance with them in Formosa and in nearby Misiones Province, helping the Peronists wrest control of the Misiones Governor's office from the UCR in 1987. Frigerio negotiated something similar in the other end of the country, Santa Cruz Province; electing two MID councilwomen to the Río Gallegos City Council, Frigerio advised them to support Peronist candidates. These two city districts gave Justicialist Mayoral candidate Néstor Kirchner the deciding margin of victory in local elections in 1987. Mayor Kirchner went on become governor and, in 2003, President of Argentina. The party, which kept a presence in Congress from 1985 to 1995, endorsed Peronist candidate Carlos Menem in 1989, though their support soured when Menem turned to neo-liberal and free trade policies. Frigerio, the MID's senior figure following Frondizi's 1995 passing, endorsed President Kirchner's first Economy Minister, Roberto Lavagna, when he parted ways with the populist Kirchner ahead of the 2007 elections. Frigerio died in 2006; by then, he distanced himself from his former party. He was succeeded by a longtime collaborator Carlos Zaffore, who was succeeded in 2012 by Gustavo Puyó.
