= Federal Popular Union =

Political party in Argentina

Federal Popular Union Unión Popular Federal
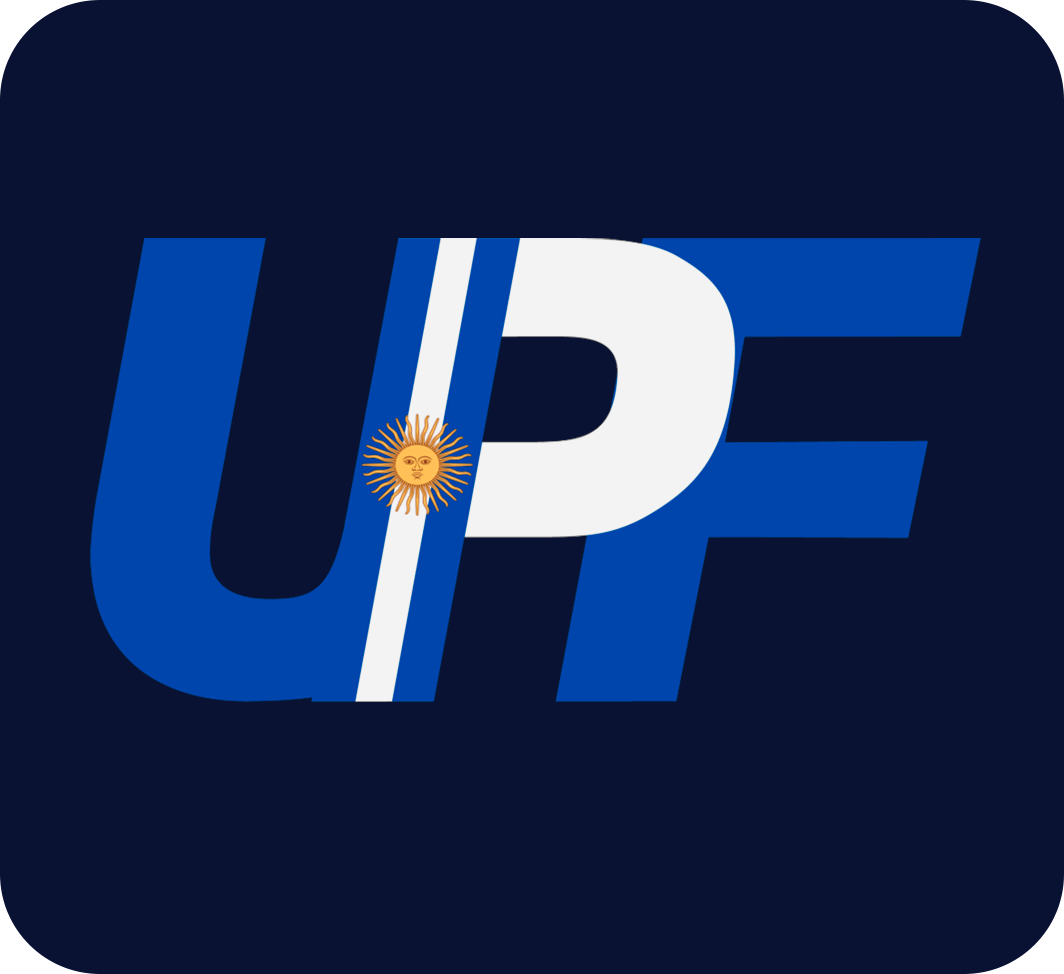
- Abbreviation: UPF
- President and National Representative: Dr. Graciela N. Devita
- Founded: December 1955
- Headquarters: Esmeralda 605 2do piso CABA Argentina
- Ideology: Federal Peronism; Conservatism; Catholic social teaching
- Political position: Centre-right
- National affiliation: Juntos por el Cambio

Website
- www.partidounionpopular.org

The Federal Popular Union (Spanish: Unión Popular Federal), formerly the Popular Union until 2020, is a centre-right political party in Argentina rooted in Peronism. Established by Juan Atilio Bramuglia as a contingency for Peronists displaced by the 1955 military coup against the populist President Juan Perón, it became a "neo-Peronist" alternative to the exiled leader's line, and subsequently, an alternative to the successive dominant factions in the Justicialist Party.

The UP re-emerged as a political force during the 2011 elections, when it was adopted as a vehicle by Eduardo Duhalde ahead of the Federal Peronist primaries on August 14.

== Overview ==
=== Emergence ===
The Popular Union was established as a result of the violent overthrow of President Juan Perón on September 19, 1955. Its founder was Juan Atilio Bramuglia. Bramuglia was a labor lawyer and chief counsel for the Unión Ferroviaria, the most powerful in the CGT umbrella labor union in the 1930s and 1940s. Following a nationalist military coup in June 1943, he joined other CGT leaders in alliance that sought a role within the new government. The principal ally in the government would be the new Labor Secretary, Colonel Juan Perón. This support helped make Perón the "power behind the throne" by 1944, and resulted in his election as President in 1946. Bramuglia would be appointed Minister of Foreign Affairs, though ultimately, opposition to him by the influential First Lady, Eva Perón, led to his resignation in 1949.

Juan Atilio Bramuglia, the party's founder, broke with Perón, though not with Peronism.

Perón's intolerance of rivals, or potential rivals, cost his administration numerous key advisers and allies, and he was overthrown in 1955. Bramuglia, who had had presidential ambitions before his 1949 fall from grace, believed he could fill the power vacuum left by Perón's exile while providing his persecuted fellow Peronists a viable contingency. He was in good terms with the dictator installed following the coup, General Eduardo Lonardi, and offered to cooperate with the latter's policy of avoiding "victors or vanquished." Lonardi agreed, and actively considered naming him to the post of Labor Minister. The move backfired, however, when Lonardi was removed from office for his conciliatory stance in November, and replaced with the more anti-Peronist General Pedro Aramburu. Bramuglia's friendships would protect him against arrests and death threats, however. He established a rapport with President Aramburu, and with the latter's permission, established the Unión Popular (UP) in December.

He was initially condemned by the exiled Perón, who viewed the UP as an attempt to develop a political alternative to the banned Peronist movement. Nor was he the only neo-Peronist leader to emerge in 1955; these also included Cipriano Reyes, who formed the Labor Party, and Vicente Saadi, who formed the Populist Party. All three were Peronists who played key roles in the movement's earliest days, and who later fell out with the populist leader. Each one openly defied Perón by forming these alternatives to his line, and more so by fielding candidates for elections to the Constitutional Assembly of 1957 (tasked with replacing Perón's 1949 Constitution). The UP adopted the Peronist tenets of nationalism and social democracy, while rejecting the personality cult Perón and the late Evita had engendered. The party received a significant boost when Alejandro Leloir, the last Chairman of the Peronist Party' executive committee before Perón's overthrow, joined the UP. Bramuglia issued conciliatory statements in a number of news magazines, and thus distanced himself from Perón's rhetoric, which, during 1956, was largely inflammatory in nature.

=== Perón to the Rosada ===
Hobbled by Perón's opposition and lacking significant support in the Peronist movement and elsewhere, the UP found itself in a position of disadvantage once the restoration of democratic institutions began in late 1956. Leloir, moreover, soon became a rival within the UP, and Bramuglia was forced to cancel its participation in the July 28 Constitutional Assembly election. Their alliance endured despite this, and he nominated Leloir for the upcoming 1958 presidential elections. Secretly, however, Perón and businessman Rogelio Julio Frigerio had negotiated an endorsement of UCRI candidate Arturo Frondizi. This endorsement, made public one month before the February 23 polls, surprised most observers (who expected the exiled leader to endorse a blank ballot option, as he had done in 1957), and persuaded Leloir to withdraw. Leloir, who consulted Frondizi instead of his UP partner, left Bramuglia no choice but to call for blank ballots.

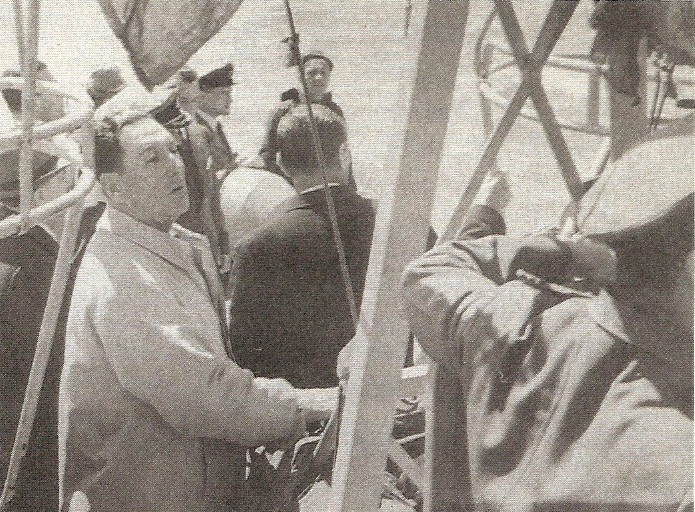
Juan Perón begins his life in exile following the 1955 coup. His overthrow gave rise to neo-Peronism and the UP

The UP elected no Congressmen in 1958, and was barred from running in 1960. President Frondizi lifted the ban ahead of the March 18, 1962, mid-term elections, and ended government receivership over the CGT labor union. The joint developments allowed Bramuglia to form an alliance with the influential textile industry union leader, Andrés Framini. Framini's UP candidacy for Governor of Buenos Aires would then receive an unexpected endorsement: that of Perón, who believed these elections to be a unique chance to regain a role in government for Peronism. Joined on the ticket by Marcos Anglada, Framini's unofficial slogan was unequivocal: "Framini-Anglada, Perón to the Rosada!"

The clear reference to the Casa Rosada (the president's executive office building) rekindled fears of Perón's return among the military and other anti-Peronists. The UP placed third with 18% of the vote, and won 10 of 14 governorships at stake (including Framini's victory in the paramount Province of Buenos Aires). President Frondizi was forced to annul UP victories by the military, and on March 28, he was overthrown. Bramuglia died in September of that year at age 59.

=== Peronism without Perón ===
The UP was initially permitted to field local and Congressional candidates by interim President José María Guido. Their intention to run in the less-than-free elections was itself in defiance of Perón, who called for blank ballots. President Guido's moderate policy toward Peronists was thwarted by conservatives and the Armed Forces, however, and on May 18, he signed an order barring the UP from the 1963 elections entirely. Leloir ran for President independently, and obtained 4 electoral votes out of 461.

The party would be led, following Bramuglia's death, by Rodolfo Tercera del Franco, the most prominent member of the Peronists' main rival (the UCR) to join the UP; and Dr. Raúl Matera, a noted neurosurgeon and longtime Peronist. The party would be cleared to participate in 1965 by the conciliatory President Arturo Illia. This concession earned Illia little political goodwill; it was vehemently opposed by anti-Peronists and second-guessed by Perón himself, whose covert return to Argentina in 1964 was impeded at the last minute by a tip, and who no longer believed any civilian government, no matter how moderate, would have the power to reinsert Peronism into the national political stage; indeed, Perón's official political party in Argentina, the Justicialist Party (PJ), had obtained recognition in the courts in January 1965, only to have the decision overturned a month later.

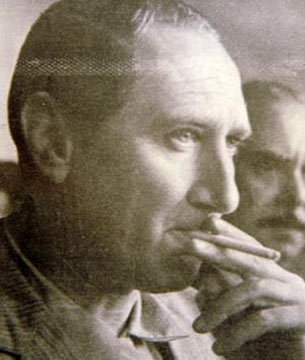
Augusto Vandor, whose strategic skill and call for "Peronism without Perón" took the UP to its historic highs.

These repeated failures to regain not only power, but also recognition, led numerous leading Peronists to adopt "Peronism without Perón." The most prominent of these, Steelworkers' Union (UOM) leader Augusto Vandor, defied Perón's call for open conflict with the Illia administration, and endorsed the UP. Drawing a clear contrast between himself and the intransigent Perón much as Bramuglia had done a decade earlier, Vandor proclaimed: "Farewell to arms; it's time for elections." His participation in the UP, and in the elections, divided Vandor and his allies in the CGT apparatus from the CGT Secretary General, José Alonso, and his allies (including Framini). Vandor's very prominence made him the UP's paramount figure, and by extension, the first viable Peronist alternative to Perón in the movement's twenty years of existence. This became all the more so when, on election day, March 17, the UP garnered 31% to 30% for the UCRP of President Illia; of 96 seats at stake in the 192-seat Lower House, the UP wrested 52 (most of whom were chosen by Vandor), and thus would be second only to the UCRP's 68.

The UP's strong showing guaranteed that allies of Vandor would now hold leadership positions in Congress. These included the new Vice President of the Lower House, Rodolfo Tercera del Franco, and more contentiously, Paulino Niembro (Vandor's right hand at the UOM), who was chosen to head the UP caucus; they therefore became the nation's highest-ranking Peronist elected officials. A member of the PJ executive committee summarized the 1965 elections by remarking that "Perón provided the votes, the UP the label, and Vandor the candidates;" this, he concluded, "can't continue."

These victories, far from being a cause for celebration for Perón and his entourage, only exacerbated the conflict within Peronism. The frustrated leader would now openly call for a coup d'état against President Illia, who refused (as Frondizi had been forced to do in 1962) to annul the results. The UP, and Peronists in general, lived under a less than ideal climate of political freedom, however; police repression of an UP Loyalty Day (October 17) rally resulted in four deaths.

Vandor's call for unity between the UP and the smaller neo-Peronist parties against Perón's personal hegemony over the movement, and the October 22 Avellaneda Declaration calling for the development of an official Peronist Party "from the ground up," nearly precipitated a final rift between Vandor and Perón. Perón believed these moves would effectively end his control of the movement, and that a power struggle to succeed the aging leader lurked behind these challenges to his leadership. Vandor avoided a rift with Perón, explaining that he "confronted Perón to save Perón." The CGT, however, separated for the first time since uniting under the "62 Organizations" system in 1957. Alonso was expelled as Secretary General by Vandor's 13 allies in the 20-member executive committee in February 1966, and formed a rival "CGT that Stands with Perón" with allies from all 62 unions.

The two forces thus clashed again on April 17, when Mendoza Province held elections for Governor and the Provincial Legislature. The UP supported the MPM candidate, Alberto Serú García, while the PJ backed Ernesto Corvalán Nanclares. The proxy fight between Perón and Vandor was, moreover, a crucial trial run ahead of similar elections scheduled for March 1967 in the three most populated provinces: Buenos Aires, Córdoba, and Santa Fe. Campaign rhetoric, accordingly, was usually heated. Serú remarked that "while others wait for orders, Vandor and I believe that Peronists must act;" and Perón replied with one of his many idiomatic expressions, charging that "if they're old enough to use their trousers, they shouldn't use my shirt."

Ultimately, the rivalry only served to divide the Peronist vote. Corvalán Nanclares' 102,000 bested Serú García's 62,000; but both lost to Emilio Jofré of the Democratic Party (a local, center-right party), who garnered 129,000. He never took office, however, because the one effort in which Alonso, Perón, and Vandor cooperated consistently — fostering labor unrest to undermine the Illia administration — helped result in a military coup on June 28, thereby rescinding all elected posts.

=== Later history ===
The Argentine Congress remained dissolved for seven years. Tercera del Franco was succeeded as the President of the UP in 1970 by Carlos Insúa, who had been President of the Club de Gimnasia y Esgrima La Plata football team from 1948 to 1955, and had been one of the UP Congressmen who had been denied a seat following the 1962 elections. Tercera del Franco remained involved in the committee, and was among those interviewed by Perón during the latter's November 1972 visit to Argentina. The last of a series of three dictators, General Alejandro Lanusse negotiated a return to democracy with Peronists (who remained the largest political force in Argentina). The UP was largely subsumed into the Justicialist Party, though Insúa was among those elected to Congress in the 1973 elections that brought Peronists back to power. The Peronist restoration unraveled following Perón's death in July 1974, and ended with the March 1976 coup.

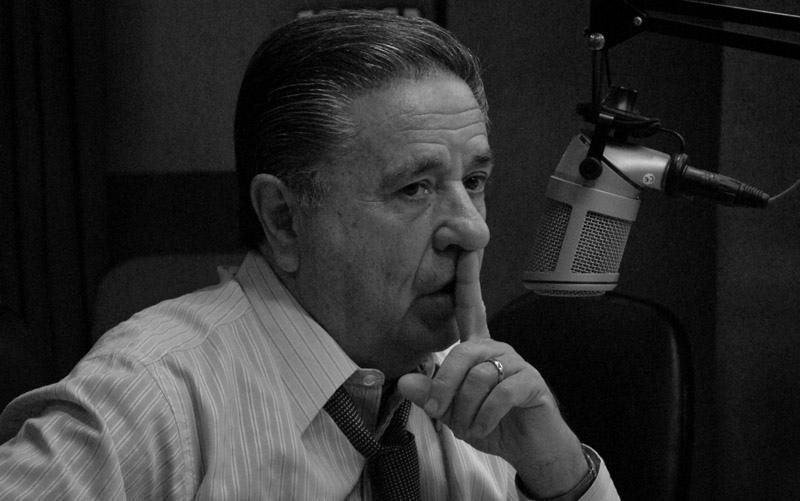
Eduardo Duhalde during the 2011 presidential race. He became the first candidate to run for high office on the UP ticket itself.

Antonio Cafiero, who had a number of economic policy positions during the administrations of both Juan and Isabel Perón (who was deposed in 1976), founded the "Movement for Unity, Solidarity and Organization" in September 1982, a reformist faction of the Justicialist Party, and gained the support of many in the UP. The group, known as Renovación Peronista (Peronist Renewal), was defeated in the Justicialist Party's September 1983 nominating convention for that year's presidential race by a more conservative faction backed by Lorenzo Miguel of the Steelworkers' Union. Cafiero's Frente Renovador Party list won a majority in the Justicialist delegation to Congress from Buenos Aires Province in elections in 1985, defeating the right wing Herminio Iglesias faction. Cafiero was elected Governor of Buenos Aires Province in 1987 and President of the Justicialist Party National Council. He ran in the May 1988 primary election for the upcoming presidential campaign; but he could not regain the support of the CGT, or sway delegates from the smaller provinces, and lost to Carlos Menem, who subsequently won the 1989 general election.

The UP would afterward endorse Peronist candidates from conservative factions. Reorganized under the Front of the Popular Movement, the party nominated San Luis Province Governor Adolfo Rodríguez Saá for President in the 2003 elections; he obtained 14% of the vote (fourth place). The UP endorsed Neuquén People's Movement presidential candidate Jorge Sobisch in 2007; Sobisch earned 1.4%, of which 0.4% were UP votes.

The Unión Popular ticket, never used as such in a presidential race, was adopted by Eduardo Duhalde, who formally announced his candidacy for the 2011 presidential race on June 9.
