= Juan Atilio Bramuglia =

Argentine labor lawyer

Minister of Foreign Relations
- In office June 4, 1946 – August 11, 1949
- President: Juan Perón
- Preceded by: Juan Isaac Cooke
- Succeeded by: Hipólito Jesús Paz

Federal Interventor of Buenos Aires Province
- In office January 12, 1945 – September 19, 1945
- Preceded by: Roberto Vanetta
- Succeeded by: Ramón del Río

Personal details
- Born: January 1, 1903 Chascomús
- Died: September 4, 1962 (aged 59) Buenos Aires
- Spouse: Esther Bramuglia
- Education: University of Buenos Aires

Juan Atilio Bramuglia (January 1, 1903 – September 4, 1962) was an Argentine labor lawyer who served as Minister of Foreign Affairs during the administration of President Juan Perón.

== Life and times ==
=== Early life and career ===
Bramuglia was born in Chascomús, Buenos Aires Province, to Italian immigrants; his father worked for the Buenos Aires Great Southern Railway. He enrolled at the University of Buenos Aires, and earned a juris doctor in 1925.

He began his legal career as a lawyer for the Unión Ferroviaria, an employer-sponsored rail workers' union, and in 1929, became its chief counsel. The union eclipsed more combative rivals in the nation's important rail sector, becoming the most powerful in the CGT umbrella labor union by the 1940s. Following a nationalist military coup in June 1943, he joined the leader of the rival rail union La Fraternidad, Francisco Capozzi, and a colleague in the CGT, retail employees' union leader Ángel Borlenghi, in alliance that sought a role within the new government. Their representative, Colonel Domingo Mercante (whose father had been a Fraternidad labor organizer), quickly established a liaison with the new Labor Secretary, Colonel Juan Perón.

Their alliance would result in the development of the first working relationship between the Department of Labor and trade unions in Argentina, principally with the CGT's "Number One" faction. Bramuglia drafted Perón's proposal to have the Labor Department promoted to a cabinet-level Ministry, a move accomplished in November 1943. He was appointed Director of Social Welfare by Labor Minister Perón in 1944, and in that capacity, drafted many of the long postponed labor laws, pension laws, and social benefits whose enactment would earn Perón lasting support from the nation's working class.

His efforts, and Vice President Perón's paramount role in the dictatorship of General Edelmiro Farrell, earned Bramuglia an appointment as Federal Interventor of Buenos Aires Province in January 1945. His tenure promoted educational and labor law improvement, though his association with Perón resulted in his dismissal by President Farrell in September amid a simmering power struggle with the popular Vice President.

He had returned to his post of chief counsel to the Unión Ferroviaria when, on October 13, Perón was arrested. The populist leader's mistress and close collaborator, Eva Duarte, called on Bramuglia's legal acumen for assistance during the crisis. Bramuglia, however, believed that a lawsuit would be counterproductive and refused; although Perón was released following mass demonstrations on October 17, this decision by Bramuglia would earn him the lasting enmity of the influential future First Lady.

=== Minister of Foreign Affairs ===
Bramuglia was appointed Minister of Foreign Affairs upon Perón's inaugural in June 1946. The new Foreign Minister had privately aspired to become Minister of Labor, which he considered would be the most important policy-making post in the new, populist government. Bramuglia was given a mandate to navigate Foreign relations of Argentina in a "Third Way" that prioritized national interests while cultivating positive relations with both Cold War superpowers. He re-established relations with the Soviet Union, facilitating grain sales to the shortage-stricken nation, and fostered a rapprochement with the United States. Relations with the latter had been strained in the aftermath of World War II, when U.S. Ambassador Spruille Braden issued a "Blue Book" report with allegations that Perón had colluded with the defeated Axis powers. Accordingly, Bramuglia ended his predecessors' policy of impeding U.S. initiatives in the Pan American Union, signed the Rio Treaty (which promoted U.S. influence in the foreign policy of other Western Hemisphere nations) against the opposition of many in his party, and made personal efforts to foster good relations with U.S. diplomats, themselves.

Bramuglia was appointed President of the United Nations Security Council in November 1948. He accepted the post during the height of tensions over the Berlin Blockade imposed by the Soviet Union. Bramuglia adopted the position that Soviet demands regarding use of the German mark in Berlin could be addressed, and during his brief tenure, he succeeded in having the four powers involved in the conflict (the U.S., the U.S.S.R., United Kingdom, and France) form a committee to resolve relevant points of contention. He remained active in subsequent negotiations despite early opposition by U.S. Secretary of State George Marshall toward his initiative, and in December, joined Marshall, Soviet Deputy Foreign Minister Andrei Vyshinsky and British Foreign Secretary Ernest Bevin in their first joint meeting regarding the crisis; following these and further talks, as well as the success of the ongoing Berlin Airlift, the blockade was lifted on May 12, 1949.

The skilled Foreign Minister could not escape misgivings harbored toward him by the First Lady, however. This antagonism became irreconcilable when Bramuglia opposed to Mrs. Perón's charm offensive, the famed 1947 "Rainbow Tour." He refused to put forward her proposal for the U.N.'s adoption of a "Declaration of Rights of Old Age," moreover, and by the time Bramuglia made international news for his role in negotiating the Berlin crisis, the First Lady was ordering radio stations to refrain from mentioning him, events such as his December 1948 discussion of the Berlin crisis with U.S. President Harry Truman, or his accomplishments. She had the Foreign Minister's photo left out of relevant print articles, even ordering his image airbrushed from group photos in Democracia, a former UCR news daily expropriated by the state.

These disputes, as well as those with the Argentine Ambassador to the U.S., Jerónimo Remorino, and the Ambassador to the United Nations, José Arce, led Bramuglia to repeatedly submit his resignation to the President, who accepted on August 11 following a sixth attempt by the Foreign Minister to do so. The heated argument that resulted led Remorino to challenge Bramuglia to a duel, which the latter prevented at the last minute; Bramuglia believed Remorino to be responsible for his fall from grace. He returned to his labor law practice and taught in the discipline at his alma mater.

=== The Popular Union ===
President Perón was ultimately deposed in a violent 1955 military coup. Bramuglia communicated with the first dictator installed after the coup, General Eduardo Lonardi, and offered to cooperate with the latter's policy of avoiding "victors or vanquished." Lonardi agreed, and actively considered naming him to the post of Labor Minister that had been denied him a decade earlier. The move backfired, however, when Lonardi was removed from office for his conciliatory stance in November. Bramuglia was briefly arrested, though his friendship with numerous policemen, as well as with the new War Minister, General León Bengoa, would protect him against further arrests, as well as against numerous death threats subsequently. He nonetheless established the Unión Popular (UP) in December as an attempt to develop a political alternative to the banned Peronist movement. He obtained permission from Lonardi's successor, General Pedro Aramburu, and was, in turn, publicly condemned by the exiled Perón.

Increasingly repressive measures on the part of Aramburu further polarized Argentine politics, however, and led to General Juan José Valle's failed revolt against Aramburu in June 1956 (for which 31 were executed). Bramuglia issued conciliatory statements in a number of news magazines, including the highly anti-peronist Ahora, whose publication of the Bramuglias' address and phone number led to threats and harassment. He declared that "every family is looking forward to peace, and to shaping the future through a political culture that includes political parties," and thus distanced himself from Perón's rhetoric, which, during 1956, was largely inflammatory in nature.

The UP adopted the Peronist tenets of nationalism and social democracy, while rejecting the personality cult Perón and the late Evita had engendered. The party received a significant boost when Alejandro Leloir, the last Chairman of the Peronist Party' executive committee before Perón's overthrow, joined the UP. Bramuglia was not the only Neo-Peronist leader to emerge in 1955; these also included Cipriano Reyes, who formed the Labor Party, and Vicente Saadi, who formed the Populist Party. All three were Peronists who played key roles in the movement's earliest days, and who later fell out with the populist leader. Each one openly defied Perón by forming these alternatives to his line, and more so by fielding candidates for elections to the Constitutional Assembly of 1957 (tasked with replacing Perón's 1949 Constitution).

Leloir soon became a rival within the UP, and Bramuglia was forced to cancel its participation in the July 28 election. Their alliance endured despite this, and he nominated Leloir for the upcoming 1958 presidential elections. Secretly, however, Perón and businessman Rogelio Julio Frigerio had negotiated an endorsement of UCRI candidate Arturo Frondizi. This endorsement, made public one month before the February 23 polls, surprised most observers (who expected the exiled leader to endorse a blank ballot option, as he had done in 1957), and persuaded Leloir to withdraw. Leloir, who consulted Frondizi instead of his UP partner, left Bramuglia no choice but to call for blank ballots himself.

The UP elected no Congressmen in 1958, and was barred from running in 1960. President Frondizi lifted the ban ahead of the 1962 mid-term elections, and ended government receivership over the CGT labor union. The joint developments allowed Bramuglia to form an alliance with the influential textile industry union leader, Andrés Framini. Framini's UP candidacy for Governor of Buenos Aires would then receive an unexpected endorsement: that of Perón, who believed these elections would give Peronism a role in government. Joined on the ticket by Marcos Anglada, Framini's unofficial slogan was unequivocal: "Framini-Anglada, Perón to the Rosada!"

The clear reference to the Casa Rosada (the president's executive office building) rekindled fears of Perón's return among the military and other anti-Peronists. The UP placed third with 18% of the vote, and won 10 of 14 governorships at stake (including Framini's victory in the paramount Province of Buenos Aires). President Frondizi was forced to annul UP victories by the military, and on March 28, he was overthrown.

=== Legacy ===
Bramuglia died in September of that year at age 59; the UP, banned during the 1963 election, would be allowed to participate in 1965, and its strong showing would again prompt a military coup.

The Vice President of the University of Tel Aviv, Professor Ranaan Rein, authored detailed studies of both Bramuglia and the Popular Union. He emphasized that the former Foreign Minister, whom he considered "the most eminent and talented cabinet member of Perón's first term," was a needed pragmatic influence in a country whose politics "have oscillated between ideological inconsistency and the narrowest dogmatism."

In the 1996 film Evita Bramuglia is portrayed by Gary Brooker, singing the song "Rainbow Tour".
