= 1993 Argentine provincial elections =

Provincial elections were held in Argentina on 3 October 1993, alongside parliamentary elections.

== Corrientes ==
=== Governor ===
Candidates		Party	Votes	%
Governor	Vice governor	Party	Votes	%
Raúl Rolando Romero Feris	Lázaro Chiappe	Autonomist–Liberal Pact	188,383	47.73
Alberto Di Filippo	Rubén Pruyas	Frente para la Victoria	148,462	37.62
		Radical Civic Union	45,804	11.61
		Frente Correntino (PDC–PI)	4,351	1.10
		Movement for Dignity and Independence	3,843	0.97
		Acción Correntina	2,520	0.64
		Frente Pueblo Unido	1,303	0.33

=== Deputies ===
Party	Votes	%	Seats
Autonomist–Liberal Pact	183,268	47.13	7
Frente para la Victoria	142,873	36.74	5
Radical Civic Union	49,052	12.61	1
Frente Correntino (PDC–PI)	5,413	1.39	0
Movement for Dignity and Independence	4,046	1.04	0
Acción Correntina	2,928	0.75	0
Frente Pueblo Unido	1,313	0.34	0
Source: Ministry of the Interior

=== Senate ===
Party	Votes	%	Seats
Autonomist–Liberal Pact	182,925	47.00	2
Frente para la Victoria	144,097	37.02	2
Radical Civic Union	49,158	12.63	0
Frente Correntino (PDC–PI)	4,852	1.25	0
Movement for Dignity and Independence	4,132	1.06	0
Acción Correntina	2,760	0.71	0
Frente Pueblo Unido	1,312	0.34	0
Source: Ministry of the Interior
