= 1965 Argentine legislative election =

- 14 March 1965
- 99 of the 192 seats in the Chamber of Deputies
- Turnout: 83.72%
Party	Vote %	Seats	+/–
Popular Union	31.12	35	+32
People's Radical Civic Union	29.72	34	−3
National Federation of Centre Parties	7.38	8	+4
Integration and Development Movement	6.01	5	New
Intransigent Radical Civic Union	4.52	1	−21
Democratic Progressive Party	3.21	3	−3
Argentine Socialist Party	2.06	1	−2
Three Flags Party	1.65	2	+1
Provincial Action	1.17	2	New
Mendoza Popular Action	1.09	1	New
Blockist Radical Civic Union	0.84	2	+1
White Party	0.51	1	+3
San Luis Popular Action	0.26	1	0
Neuquén People's Movement	0.24	2	0
National Unity Party	0.04	1	New
This lists parties that won seats. See the complete results below.
Results by province

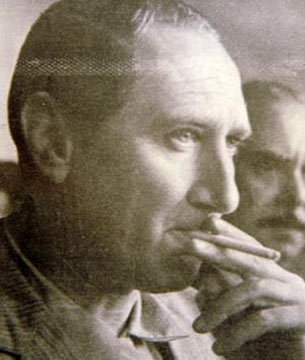
Augusto Vandor, whose strategic skill and call for "Peronism without Perón" allowed the UP to benefit from Illia's policy of Peronist inclusion

Legislative elections were held in Argentina on 14 March 1965. Voters chose their legislators with a turnout of 84%.

== Background ==
The exiled populist leader, Juan Perón, continued to set the electoral agenda. The economy had recovered vigorously from the 1962-63 recession, and this only seemed to deprive voters and the media of a distraction away from speculation as to what steps Perón might take next to return to Argentina. This issue was highlighted by his failed December 1964 attempt to arrive in Buenos Aires - thwarted almost by accident. His still-sizable Peronist base, in turn, were divided between those who felt his return was critical to their political future, and those who sought alternatives. One of the most successful projects to these ends was the Popular Union (UP), a party founded within days of Perón's violent, September 1955 overthrow. Its founder, Juan Atilio Bramuglia, had been a close advisor of Perón's since the birth of the movement, in 1945. Bramuglia had been unable, however, to obtain support for the idea from Perón himself, who favored electoral alliances. Bramuglia died in 1962; but the failure of one such alliance in 1963 provided Popular Union supporters with their first realistic chance to represent the aging leader.

The president, Dr. Arturo Illia, faced immediate pressure from the military and other anti-peronists to bar the Popular Union from fielding any candidates; but the moderate Illia refused. The adoption of the UP mantle by Steelworkers' leader Augusto Vandor defied Perón's call for open conflict with the Illia administration, moreover. The issue of the UP divided Vandor and his allies in the CGT from the CGT Secretary General, José Alonso, and his allies (including Andrés Framini, who had run on the UP ticket in 1962 and won, only to have the elections annulled). Vandor's very prominence made him the UP's paramount figure, and by extension, the first viable Peronist alternative to Perón in the movement's twenty years of existence.

Despite fears this might trigger a coup, the elections proceeded on schedule. President Illia's centrist UCR did not benefit from economic growth, and they lost 4 seats. Former President Pedro Aramburu's anti-peronist UDELPA benefited even less from Perón's barely thwarted return, and they lost half their 14 seats. Former President Arturo Frondizi's MID, which had been barred from running by conservative opposition in 1963, picked up 16 seats in its first electoral test. This was significant because the MID had bested his former party, the UCRI (with which he had parted ways in 1963). The UCRI was left with but 11 of its 40 seats, the result of losing both Frondizi's and Perón's erstwhile support. Most of these seats went to the Popular Union, which gained 44. Its leader, Dr. Rodolfo Tecera del Franco, was elected vice president of the Argentine Chamber of Deputies.

The 1965 elections were a notable accomplishment for President Illia, who had stopped military interference against them without it immediately costing him the presidency.

== Results ==
Party	Votes	%	Seats	
Party	Votes	%	Won	Total
Popular Union	2,786,244	31.12	35	36
People's Radical Civic Union	2,660,937	29.72	34	69
National Federation of Centre Parties (PD–PLCo–PACo)	661,108	7.38	8	14
Integration and Development Movement	538,057	6.01	5	6
Intransigent Radical Civic Union	404,689	4.52	1	19
Democratic Progressive Party	287,250	3.21	3	9
Christian Democratic Party	241,764	2.70	0	4
Argentine Socialist Party	184,023	2.06	1	4
Union of the Argentine People	181,094	2.02	0	8
Democratic Socialist Party	170,362	1.90	0	2
Three Flags Party	148,067	1.65	2	4
Provincial Action	104,835	1.17	2	2
Mendoza Popular Movement	97,705	1.09	1	1
Blockist Radical Civic Union	75,225	0.84	2	2
National Reconstruction Party	50,979	0.57	0	0
White Party	46,013	0.51	1	4
Social Justice Party	41,727	0.47	0	0
People's Party	40,393	0.45	0	0
Las Flores–Luján Line Movement	37,435	0.42	0	0
Labour Party	25,900	0.29	0	2
Renewal Crusade Radical Civic Union	24,431	0.27	0	0
Argentine Reconstruction Party	23,646	0.26	0	0
San Luis Popular Action	23,297	0.26	1	1
Argentine Popular Action	22,366	0.25	0	0
Neuquén People's Movement	21,052	0.24	2	2
Provincial Defence–White Flag	12,163	0.14	0	1
Provincial Party of Santiago del Estero	7,922	0.09	0	0
National Independent Party	5,974	0.07	0	0
Party of the Liberating Revolution	5,396	0.06	0	0
Provincial Party of Chubut	5,125	0.06	0	0
Argentine Retirees Union	5,052	0.06	0	0
Union Force	3,959	0.04	0	0
National Unity Party	3,273	0.04	1	1
Federal Social Movement	2,784	0.03	0	0
National Union Party	2,085	0.02	0	0
Neighborhood Party	625	0.01	0	0
Popular Workers Party	544	0.01	0	0
Santa Cruz Popular Movement	415	0.00	0	0
Defense of Labour	333	0.00	0	0
Democratic Federal Movement			–	1
Total	8,954,249	100.00	99	192
Valid votes	8,954,249	95.77		
Invalid votes	37,708	0.40		
Blank votes	357,871	3.83		
Total votes	9,349,828	100.00		
Registered voters/turnout	11,168,564	83.72		
Source: Cantón, Nohlen

=== Results by province ===
Province	Popular Union			UCRP			Center Parties			MID			Other Peronists			Others		
Province	Votes	%	Seats	Votes	%	Seats	Votes	%	Seats	Votes	%	Seats	Votes	%	Seats	Votes	%	Seats
Buenos Aires	1,358,651	41.12	14	970,701	29.38	9	180,444	5.46	1	114,884	3.48	1	19,847	0.60	0	659,293	19.96	1
Buenos Aires City	549,057	33.69	8	552,678	33.91	8	58,876	3.61	0	54,808	3.36	0	5,432	0.33	0	409,009	25.09	2
Chaco	80,930	43.54	2	60,220	32.40	1	7,441	4.00	0	15,127	8.14	0	—	—	—	22,138	11.91	0
Chubut	16,545	33.59	1	17,035	34.59	1	—	—	—	3,608	7.33	0	5,125	10.41	0	6,940	14.09	0
Córdoba	357,544	38.75	5	339,039	36.75	4	69,454	7.53	0	37,687	4.08	0	9,007	0.98	0	109,886	11.91	0
Corrientes	45,212	18.89	0	14,308	5.98	0	156,354	65.32	5	—	—	—	—	—	—	23,507	9.82	0
Entre Ríos	18,602	4.85	0	123,369	32.14	2	29,989	7.81	0	60,117	15.66	1	97,044	25.28	1	54,720	14.26	0
La Pampa	32,488	40.32	1	17,356	21.54	0	—	—	—	22,037	27.35	1	—	—	—	8,700	10.80	0
Mendoza	16,199	4.74	0	87,666	25.65	1	104,120	30.46	1	9,275	2.71	0	97,705	28.59	1	26,826	7.85	0
Neuquén	—	—	—	9,395	23.45	0	—	—	—	2,968	7.41	0	21,052	52.55	2	6,649	16.60	0
Río Negro	—	—	—	20,600	29.84	1	1,966	2.85	0	4,777	6.92	0	28,158	40.79	1	13,531	19.60	0
San Juan	25,643	15.21	0	28,357	16.82	1	3,215	1.91	0	2,359	1.40	0	4,806	2.85	0	104,183	61.81	2
San Luis	19,700	23.37	0	8,603	10.21	0	28,943	34.34	1	—	—	—	23,297	27.64	1	3,752	4.45	0
Santa Cruz	3,707	25.93	1	2,649	24.03	0	695	4.86	0	719	5.03	0	306	2.14	0	6,220	43.51	1
Santa Fe	196,794	20.85	2	274,547	29.09	4	12,790	1.35	0	198,473	21.03	2	30,759	3.26	0	230,573	24.43	2
Santiago del Estero	36,249	19.82	1	60,492	33.07	1	1,884	1.03	0	9,157	5.01	0	51,023	27.90	1	24,091	13.17	0
Tucumán	28,923	9.21	0	73,922	23.53	1	4,937	1.57	0	2,061	0.66	0	120,160	38.25	2	84,164	26.79	0
Total	2,786,244	31.12	35	2,660,937	29.72	34	661,108	7.38	8	538,057	6.01	5	513,721	5.74	9	1,794,182	20.04	8
