= Andrés Framini =

Argentine labor leader and politician

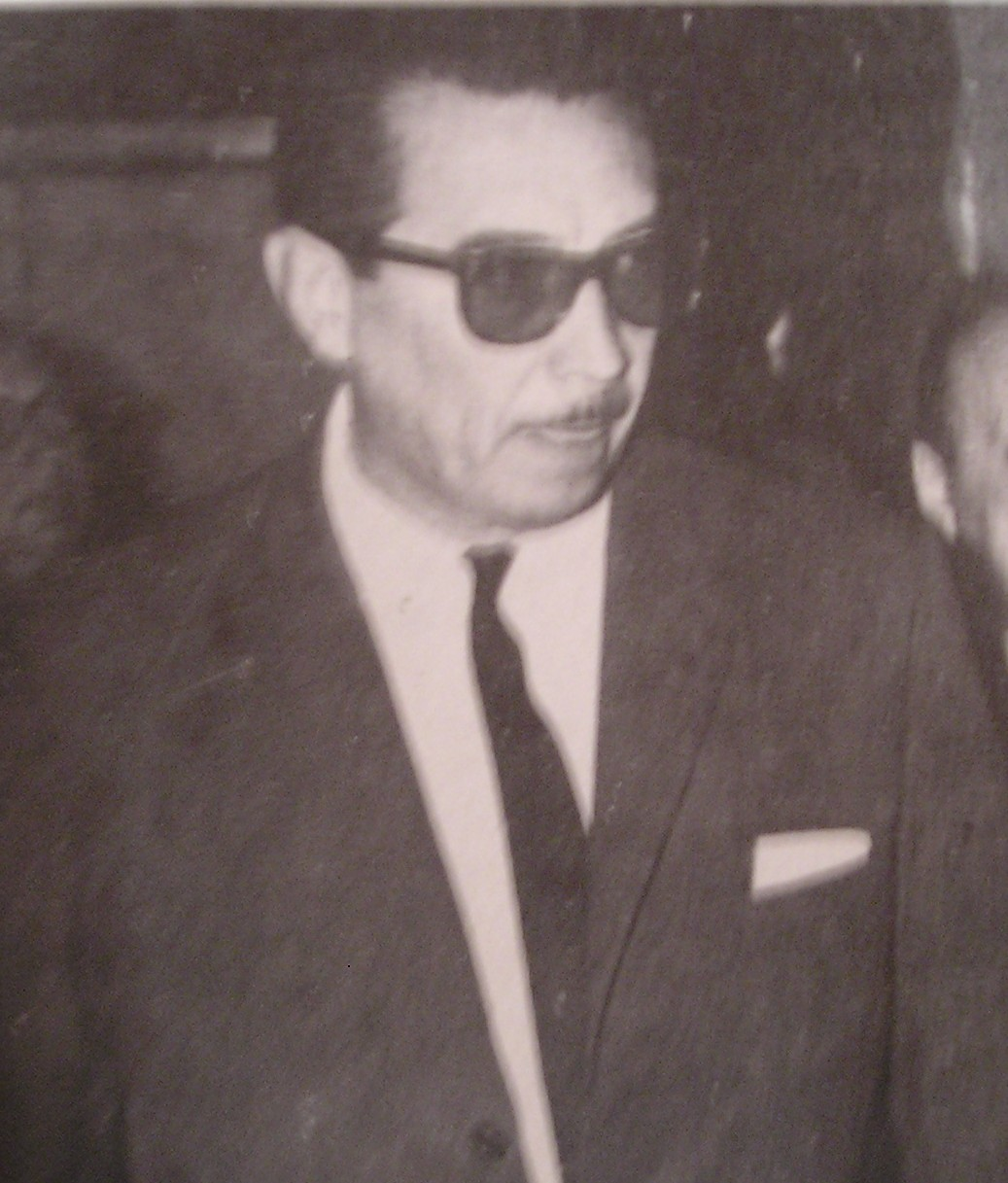
- Andrés Framini in 1955.

Personal details
- Born: August 2, 1914 Berisso
- Died: May 9, 2001 (aged 86) Buenos Aires
- Party: Justicialist Party

Andrés Framini (August 2, 1914 – May 9, 2001) was an Argentine labor leader and politician.

== Biography ==
=== Early career ===
Andrés Framini was born in the working-class La Plata suburb of Berisso, in 1914. He entered the labor force as a peon in one of Buenos Aires' many textile manufacturers, eventually working for the important Piccaluga facility in the southside Barracas section of the city. Poor pay and working conditions provided Labor Minister and then Vice President Juan Perón a powerful political opportunity, which he seized by aggressively lobbying employers for a redress of these grievances, which had hitherto been quite difficult for most working-class Argentines to do. The Vice President's receptiveness to reform and his assurances of change earned Framini's support. Following President Edelmiro Farrell's October 13, 1945, arrest of the increasingly popular Perón, Framini participated actively in the October 17 mobilizations that freed the populist leader and forced the regime to call elections for early in 1946; Perón was elected handily.

Encouraged by these developments, the Textile Workers' Association (AOT) was formed ten days later as an affiliate of the umbrella CGT, and Framini was elected factory shop steward. Following a series of failed strikes in 1953 against President Perón's austerity plan, Framini displaced the AOT's more militant, left-wing leadership, becoming the powerful union's Secretary General. In that capacity, he was among those present at the June 16, 1955, rally at the Plaza de Mayo in support of the president following his excommunication by Pope Pius XII, a day earlier. As Perón spoke, Argentine Air Force Gloster Meteor jets flew overhead, dropping their ordnance and killing over 350 before flying to safety in neighboring Uruguay; Perón was ultimately overthrown on September 19.

=== Resistance and the CGT's reorganization ===
The moderately anti-Peronist new president, Gen. Eduardo Lonardi, held talks with the CGT that sought to allow the continued existence of the 2.5 million-member labor union (the largest in Latin America, at the time), while coercing the CGT to abandon Peronism. The CGT's directors resigned on October 5, leaving the leadership to Framini and to Light and Power Union leader Luis Natalini.

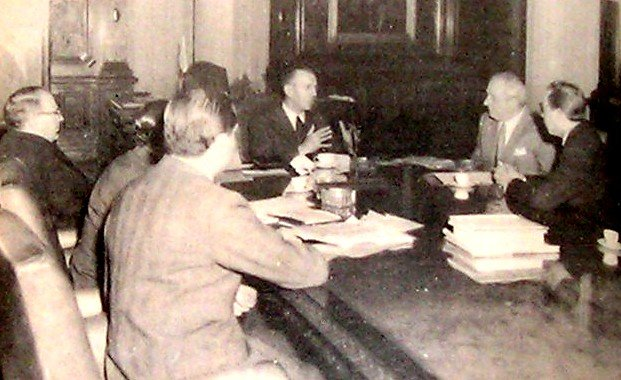
October 1955: President Eduardo Lonardi chairs talks with CGT leaders Luis Natalini and Andrés Framini (right).

The two CGT leaders arrived at an agreement with Labor Minister Luis Cerruti Costa (himself an erstwhile Peronist) within a day of taking over. They greed to union elections within 120 days and the formal abandonment of peronism, in return for assurances against government (or military) intervention. Cerruti Costa's insistence on continuing to replace CGT leaders led to Framini's October 26 ultimatum against him, with the threat of a general strike. This was averted at the last minute; but on November 13, General Lonardi was replaced with the more anti-Peronist Gen. Pedro Aramburu.

Framini responded by calling a three-day general strike for November 15; Aramburu had over 9,000 CGT figures (including Framini and Natalini) jailed, however, thus foiling the strike. The failed strike was followed by a prison sentence for Framini, at which he was stripped of official CGT leadership. He then formed an "Authentic CGT" and was among the civilian organizers of a failed, June 9, 1956, coup led by Gen, Juan José Valle against Aramburu - a fiasco which resulted in Valle's execution, as well as of 26 others'. Framini himself escaped this fate by going into hiding.

The AOT received a military-appointed leader, though in 1957 the regime allowed new labor union elections resulting in the victory of Framini's deputy at the textile union, Juan Carlos Loholaberry. The regime's appointees at the CGT sabotaged an August 1957 congress by walking out (depriving the congress of quorum), and Framini responded by calling two general strikes, in September and October.

Framini geared for the February 1958 elections by echoing the exiled Juan Perón's endorsement of the UCRI candidate, Arturo Frondizi. The military, however, forced Frondizi to appoint an ultra-conservative military contractor, Álvaro Alsogaray, as Economy Minister at the end of 1958, throwing Framini and labor, in general, against the new administration. The president retaliated by having Framini arrested numerous times in 1959 - a year marked by recession and labor conflicts. The labor leader's case was brought before the International Labour Organization (ILO), which prevailed on President Frondizi to allow Framini due process. He was returned as head of the AOT, later that year.

=== Candidate for governor ===
The textile workers' leader helped organize the Commission of 20, in October 1960, with the goal of persuading Frondizi to rid the CGT of its puppet leadership. A successful, November 7, 1960, general strike resulted in the president's agreeing to talks, and on March 3, 1961, the CGT was entrusted to the Commission of 20 (ending nearly 6 years of government receivership). These accomplishments encouraged Peronists to field candidates for Congress and the governorships, ahead of the March 1962 mid-term elections.

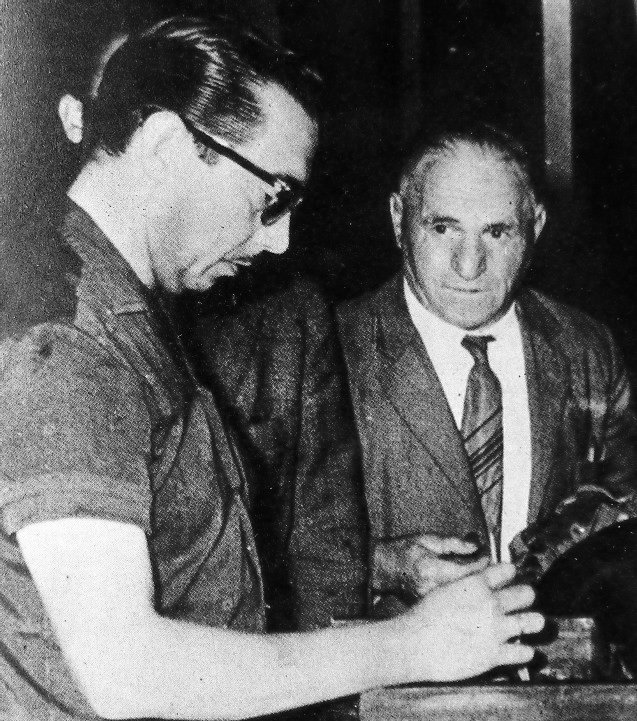
Framini votes in the 1962 gubernatorial elections.

Peronism and its political vehicle, the Justicialist Party, had been banned from political life since 1955; but Framini and other Peronists ran on proxy political parties organized after Perón's overthrow, notably Juan Atilio Bramuglia's Popular Union. The Popular Union nominated Framini for governor of the Province of Buenos Aires (home to 38% of Argentines) and for vice-governor: Perón, himself. The leader believed this symbolic spot on the ticket (which, unable to return, he could never fill) would prove a powerful endorsement to Framini; but the move backfired. Frondizi's government declared Perón's candidacy null and void, and even Cardinal Caggiano (a supporter of Perón's until his overthrow) spoke out against the move.

Receiving the endorsement of Socialist Party leaders Alfredo Palacios and Alicia Moreau de Justo, and joined on the ticket by Marcos Anglada, Framini's unofficial slogan was unequivocal, however: "Framini-Anglada, Perón to the Rosada!" The clear reference to the Casa Rosada (the president's executive office building) put anti-peronists and the military on high alert when, in fact, Perón's proxies won 10 of 14 governorships at stake - including Framini's victory in the all-important Province of Buenos Aires. President Frondizi was forced to annul Framini's March 18 victory, and despite quickly obeying military demands, on March 28 the president was overthrown.

=== Framini versus Vandor ===
Framini led a gathering on the steps of the Provincial Legislature in La Plata to demand he be sworn in as governor; the demonstration was violently repressed, however. These bitter experience helped divide the CGT once again, moreover, and two camps eventually developed in the trade union. The leader of the Steel and Metalworks Union (UOM), Augusto Vandor, favored distancing the CGT from Perón; while Framini did not. A plenary held near La Falda in June 1962 resulting in a marked leftward shift in the CGT's platform, a position encouraged by the re-appointment of the anti-labor Alvaro Alsogaray and a new, deep recession.

The two leaders' differences were superficial, initially, and the two formed part of the Peronist Tactical Command, the movement's secret political think tank. Perón's frustrated December 1964 return to Argentina only exacerbated tensions between the two factions and, in February 1966, the CGT was divided. Framini counted on strong supporters, such as CGT Secretary General José Alonso, rail workers' leader Lorenzo Pepe, and the sanitation workers' leader Amado Olmos. As head of the UOM (the CGT's largest union), however, Vandor was able to eject Alonso as CGT head. Vandor's faction of the CGT benefited as well from the June 28, 1966, coup d'état against President Arturo Illia (overthrown for allowing Peronists to take their seats in Congress following a 1965 election victory). Illia's replacement, Gen. Juan Carlos Onganía, appointed a Labor Minister, Rubens San Sebastián, whose self-professed strategy vis-à-vis the CGT was that of "divide and conquer;" San Sebastián's support for Vandor eventually helped lead the AOT to replace Framini for his deputy, Juan Carlos Laholaberry, in 1968.

=== Later life ===
Framini's own exit from the AOT was far from ceremonious: as the rank-and-file voted, they learned that he had been apparently kidnapped. The prominent Buenos Aires daily, Crónica, exposed the kidnapping as a hoax, however, and Framini kept a low profile for some time. The incident inspired Víctor Proncet's script for director Raymundo Gleyzer's 1973 drama Los traidores (The Traitors) – a banned film which, to date, has not been shown publicly.

Following the Peronists' return to power in 1973, Framini was unable to return to political prominence. The early morning hours of March 24, 1976, found him and Mrs. Framini away from home – a coincidence that saved their lives when the newly installed military dictatorship raided their home with the intention of eliminating the retired labor leader. The Framinis were forced to sell the home and relocate to a tiny apartment, where they remained due to economic duress following the end of the dictatorship in 1983.

Framini received numerous recognitions in later years. His 1962 electoral victory was honored with the bestowment of the title of "Former Governor-elect of the Province of Buenos Aires" by Governor Eduardo Duhalde and the Argentine Chamber of Deputies recognized him for his historical role as a Notable Argentine, in 1997. Framini opposed President Carlos Menem's abandonment of his populist Peronist platform (on which he was elected in 1989) and offered his support to a small left-wing party in 2000. He attended a May 9, 2001, tribute to the populist former first lady, Eva Perón, at the Argentine Workers' Center headquarters. There, Leonardo Favio's Perón: A Symphony of Feelings (1999) was shown as part of the tribute, and when the projection came to an end, Andrés Framini was found dead in his seat; he was 86. He was buried in La Chacarita Cemetery.
