= Carlos Raúl Contín =

Argentine politician (1915–1991)

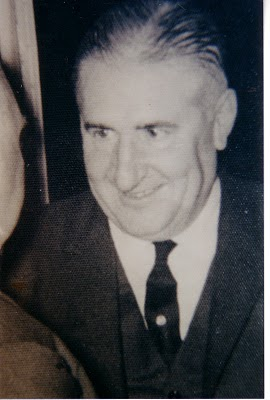

Governor of Entre Ríos Province
- In office October 12, 1963 – June 28, 1966
- Preceded by: Leandro Ruiz Moreno
- Succeeded by: Ricardo Favre

Provincial Deputy of Entre Ríos Province
- In office May 1, 1958 – March 29, 1962

Personal details
- Born: November 4, 1915 (Argentina) Nogoyá, Entre Ríos Province
- Died: August 8, 1991 (aged 75) Buenos Aires
- Party: Radical Civic Union
- Spouse: Nélida Biaggioni
- Education: National University of the Littoral
- Profession: Biochemist

Carlos Raúl Contín (November 4, 1915 – August 8, 1991) was an Argentine politician and leader of the centrist Radical Civic Union (UCR).

== Life and times ==
Born in Nogoyá, Contín enrolled in the National University of the Littoral and became a biochemist by profession. He married Nelida Biaggioni, a native of the city of Gálvez, Santa Fe Province, in 1946. Contín campaigned from his youth for the UCR, representing the party as alderman of his city, Nogoyá, at the age of 30 years. A leader of the UCR's "Unionist" wing (the faction most opposed to populist leader Juan Perón), he became prominent in the Entre Rios UCR when this faction eclipsed the pro-Perón "Renewal" wing. Following Perón's 1955 overthrow, and with a schism in the UCR during their 1956 convention, he joined the more conservative People's Radical Civic Union (UCRP). The rival Intransigent Radical Civic Union (UCRI) won the 1958 elections with the exiled Perón's endorsement, though Contín was elected to the Lower House of Congress for Entre Ríos Province; he was reelected in 1960, but lost his seat when President Arturo Frondizi was overthrown in 1962.

Ahead of new elections in 1963, Contín was nominated as the UCRP candidate for governor of his province in a ticket with the Mayor of Concepción del Uruguay, Teodoro Marco. The duo defeated the UCRI, securing 113,436 votes (33%), versus the latter's 94,660 (28%). The UCR returned to power in Entre Ríos after 20 years, having last governed the important province from 1914 to 1943.

His government had no majority in the provincial House of Representatives, but was able to enact significant initiatives largely due to the skill of the UCRP caucus leader, César Jaroslavsky. In this way, Contín was able to resume the stalled construction of the Hernandarias Subfluvial Tunnel that would link the city of Paraná to Santa Fe (June 1, 1964), to create the Ministry of Social Policy, the School of Social Work, School of Nursing, the Editorial de Entre Ríos publishing house, power plants, 120 primary schools, and numerous new provincial roads.

Overthrown, as was a fellow UCRP leader, President Arturo Illia, by the self-styled Revolución Argentina coup in 1966, Contin continued to be active in his party, which had retaken control of the UCR through the leadership of Ricardo Balbín. With a renewed call for elections in 1973, Contín joined former the vice president under Illia and fellow Entre Ríos figure, Carlos Perette, as a candidate for the Argentine Senate on the UCR ticket, and though Contín reached a runoff election, he was defeated by the Peronist candidate amid euphoria surrounding the aging Perón's return from exile.

Contín was elected 1st Vice President of the UCR's National Committee in 1975. Following the 1981 death of the party's longtime chair, Ricardo Balbín, he then succeeded as chair of the UCR, becoming also the head of the Multiparty Movement organized with Peronists and other political forces in calling for the end of the repressive and financially profligate dictatorship installed in 1976.

After the defeat of Argentina in the Falklands War in 1982, the last dictator, General Reynaldo Bignone, signalled support for prompt elections. Contín, however, lost support from the majority of UCR delegates, who shifted towards the center-left leader of the "Movement for Renewal and Change" faction, Raúl Alfonsín. Alfonsín had been among the few political figures of any party to publicly oppose the ill-conceived invasion, and succeeded Contín as president of the National Committee of the UCR.

Elections ultimately took place on October 30, 1983, and Alfonsín was elected President of Argentina. Contín accepted a post as Vice President of the Central Bank, though his health declined in subsequent years. His son, Carlos Alberto Contín, served as President of the Entre Ríos House of Representatives from 1983 to 1985.

== Death ==
Contín died on August 8, 1991, in Buenos Aires, during surgery; his remains rest in his hometown.
