= 1962 Argentine legislative election =

- 18 March 1962
- 96 of the 192 seats in the Chamber of Deputies
- Turnout: 85.73%
Party	Vote %	Seats	+/–
Intransigent Radical Civic Union	26.10	34	−33
People's Radical Civic Union	20.50	9	−18
Popular Union	18.20	23	New
Labour Party	9.10	12	+12
National Federation of Centre Parties	6.98	6	+4
Three Flags Party	3.09	3	New
White Party	1.34	2	+2
Civic Movement Popular Flag	0.70	2	New
Blockist Radical Civic Union	0.62	2	New
Democratic Federal Movement	3.09	1	New
Neuquén People's Movement	0.22	1	New
Provincial Party of Chubut	0.17	1	New
This lists parties that won seats. See the complete results below.
Results by province

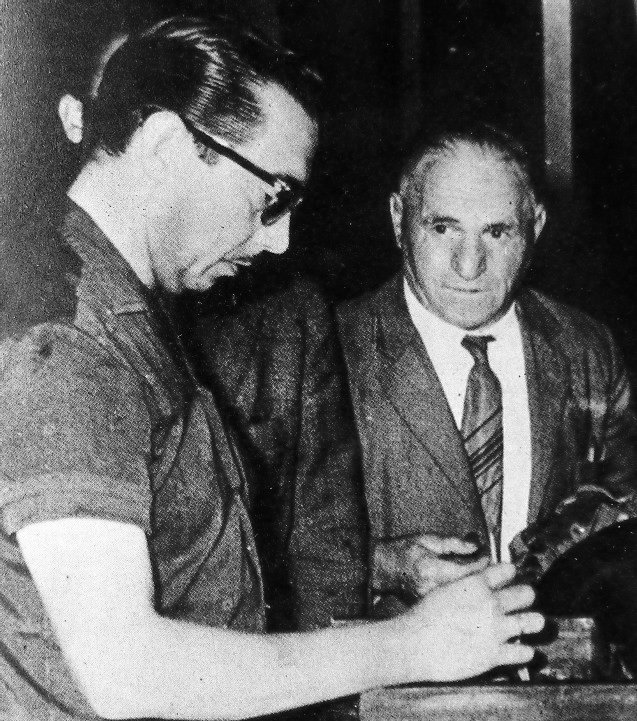
Peronist Andrés Framini votes in the 1962 gubernatorial elections. His victory in the paramount Province of Buenos Aires helped lead to President Frondizi's overthrow and the elections' annulment

Legislative elections were held in Argentina on 18 March 1862. Voters chose their legislators and governors; with a turnout of 86%.

== Background ==
Peronism and its political vehicle, the Justicialist Party remained banned from political life, as they had been since 1955. Their exiled leader, Juan Perón had given President Arturo Frondizi a critical endorsement in 1958; but Frondizi's inability to lift the ban on Peronism had led Perón to support proxy political parties organized after his overthrow, notably Juan Atilio Bramuglia's Popular Union. The Popular Union nominated textile industry workers' leader Andrés Framini for governor of the Province of Buenos Aires (home to 38% of Argentines) and for vice-governor: Perón, himself. The leader believed this symbolic spot on the ticket (which, unable to return, he could never fill) would prove a powerful endorsement to Framini; but the move backfired when Frondizi was forced to declare Perón's candidacy null and void.

Framini selected a new (plausible) running mate, though his unofficial slogan was unequivocal: "Framini-Anglada, Perón to the Rosada!" The clear reference to the Casa Rosada (the president's executive office building) put anti-peronists and the military on high alert when, in fact, Perón's proxies won 10 of 14 governorships at stake - including Framini's victory in the all-important Province of Buenos Aires. President Frondizi was forced to annul Framini's March 18 victory, and despite quickly obeying military demands, on March 28 he was overthrown.

Careful to avoid the appearance of a coup d'état, military leaders appointed Senate President José María Guido as Frondizi's successor (as the Argentine Constitution prescribes in case of the absence of both the president and v.p.). Guido, a member of Frondizi's UCRI, reluctantly accepted the figurehead post and on May 1, annulled the results of all legislative and gubernatorial 1962 elections.

== Results ==
Party	Votes	%	Seats	
Party	Votes	%	Won	Total
Intransigent Radical Civic Union	2,284,091	26.10	34	78
People's Radical Civic Union	1,793,945	20.50	9	58
Popular Union	1,592,446	18.20	23	23
Labour Party	796,529	9.10	12	12
National Federation of Centre Parties (PD–PLCo–PACo)	610,963	6.98	6	8
Three Flags Party	270,248	3.09	3	3
Democratic Socialist Party	250,172	2.86	0	0
Christian Democratic Party	169,824	1.94	0	0
Democratic Progressive Party	156,114	1.78	0	0
Argentine Socialist Party - House of the People	139,137	1.59	0	0
White Party	117,550	1.34	2	2
Civic Movement Popular Flag	60,915	0.70	2	2
People's Party	55,181	0.63	0	0
Blockist Radical Civic Union	54,441	0.62	2	2
Party of Labour and Progress	48,306	0.55	0	0
Democratic Federal Movement	36,123	0.41	1	1
Provincial Defence–White Flag	32,732	0.37	0	1
Property Owners Union	25,275	0.29	0	0
Renewal Crusade Radical Civic Union	24,123	0.28	0	0
Republican Union	19,960	0.23	0	0
Neuquén People's Movement	18,879	0.22	1	1
Argentine Socialist Vanguard Party	17,914	0.20	0	0
National Popular Movement	17,555	0.20	0	0
Workers' Party	17,270	0.20	0	0
Provincial Party of Chubut	15,065	0.17	1	1
Civic Union	14,051	0.16	0	0
Socialist Party (PS)	12,346	0.14	0	0
Populist Party	10,304	0.12	0	0
Christian Democratic People's Union	9,396	0.11	0	0
Federal Union	9,143	0.10	0	0
Principist Radical Civic Union	6,520	0.07	0	0
Civic Union National and Popular Movement	6,323	0.07	0	0
Radical Civic Union of Salta	6,069	0.07	0	0
Antipersonalist Radical Civic Union	6,065	0.07	0	0
Labour Gathering Party	5,758	0.07	0	0
Radical Civic Union of Santa Fe	5,750	0.07	0	0
Argentine Popular Movement	4,589	0.05	0	0
Progressive Action	4,571	0.05	0	0
Radical Civic Union of Santiago del Estero	4,073	0.05	0	0
Ruralist Party	3,428	0.04	0	0
Christian Democratic Movement	3,333	0.04	0	0
Agrarian Social Party	3,227	0.04	0	0
Christian Social Front	3,186	0.04	0	0
Argentine Socialist Party – Chaco Federation	2,766	0.03	0	0
Socialist Party – Workers' Front	2,317	0.03	0	0
Nationalist Civic Union	2,092	0.02	0	0
Federal Agrarian Labour Party	1,327	0.02	0	0
Workers' Argentine Socialist Party	137	0.00	0	0
Radical Recovery Movement	12	0.00	0	0
Unity and Progress Movement	11	0.00	0	0
Conservative Provincial Labour Party	3	0.00	0	0
Communist Party of Argentina	1	0.00	0	0
Total	8,751,556	100.00	96	192
Valid votes	8,751,556	96.33		
Invalid/blank votes	332,956	3.67		
Total votes	9,084,512	100.00		
Registered voters/turnout	10,596,321	85.73		
Source: Cantón, Minitstry of the Interior, Nohlen

=== Results by province ===
Province	Peronist Parties			UCRI			UCRP			Center Parties			Others		
Province	Votes	%	Seats	Votes	%	Seats	Votes	%	Seats	Votes	%	Seats	Votes	%	Seats
Buenos Aires	1,206,894	39.37	17	731,877	23.88	8	627,094	20.46	0	179,697	5.86	0	319,876	10.43	0
Buenos Aires City	460,471	29.25	6	456,968	29.03	12	353,980	22.49	0	49,638	3.15	0	253,043	16.08	0
Chaco	60,915	32.41	2	58,225	30.98	0	49,083	26.11	0	7,536	4.01	0	12,213	6.50	0
Chubut	18,361	40.36	1	12,831	28.20	0	12,885	28.32	0	1	0.00	0	1,416	3.11	0
Córdoba	295,617	33.11	3	180,709	20.24	0	309,329	34.65	7	70,131	7.86	0	36,950	4.14	0
Corrientes	7,017	3.06	0	85,319	37.15	1	6,738	2.93	0	123,354	53.71	3	7,229	3.15	0
Entre Ríos	72,350	20.91	0	122,917	35.52	2	104,823	30.29	1	27,429	7.93	0	18,525	5.35	0
Jujuy	38,304	51.08	2	26,539	35.39	0	4,167	5.56	0	5,965	7.95	0	15	0.02	0
La Pampa	27,611	36.11	0	29,378	38.42	2	13,031	17.04	0	—	—	—	6,445	8.43	0
Mendoza	151,115	40.53	1	46,912	12.58	0	59,582	15.98	0	93,186	24.99	3	22,033	5.91	0
Neuquén	18,879	49.95	1	10,962	29.00	0	4,460	11.80	0	863	2.28	0	2,630	6.96	0
Río Negro	26,169	40.11	2	18,688	28.64	0	15,182	23.27	0	1,601	2.45	0	3,602	5.52	0
Salta	85,363	57.15	3	25,591	17.13	0	12,244	8.20	0	18,369	12.30	0	7,787	5.21	0
San Juan	54,441	34.07	2	43,026	26.93	1	20,789	13.01	0	14,799	9.26	0	26,739	16.74	0
Santa Fe	293,018	29.96	3	295,973	30.27	7	138,291	14.14	0	9,154	0.94	0	241,439	24.69	0
Santiago del Estero	70,243	36.78	2	50,392	26.39	0	56,057	29.35	1	5,284	2.77	0	8,993	4.71	0
Tucumán	162,559	53.33	2	87,784	28.80	1	6,210	2.04	0	3,956	1.30	0	44,295	14.53	0
Total	3,049,327	34.84	45	2,284,091	26.10	34	1,793,945	20.50	9	610,963	6.98	6	1,013,230	11.58	2
