= 1957 Argentine Constitutional Assembly election =

Constituent Assembly elections were held in Argentina on 28 July 1957. Voters chose delegates to the assembly, and with a turnout of 90%.

== Background ==
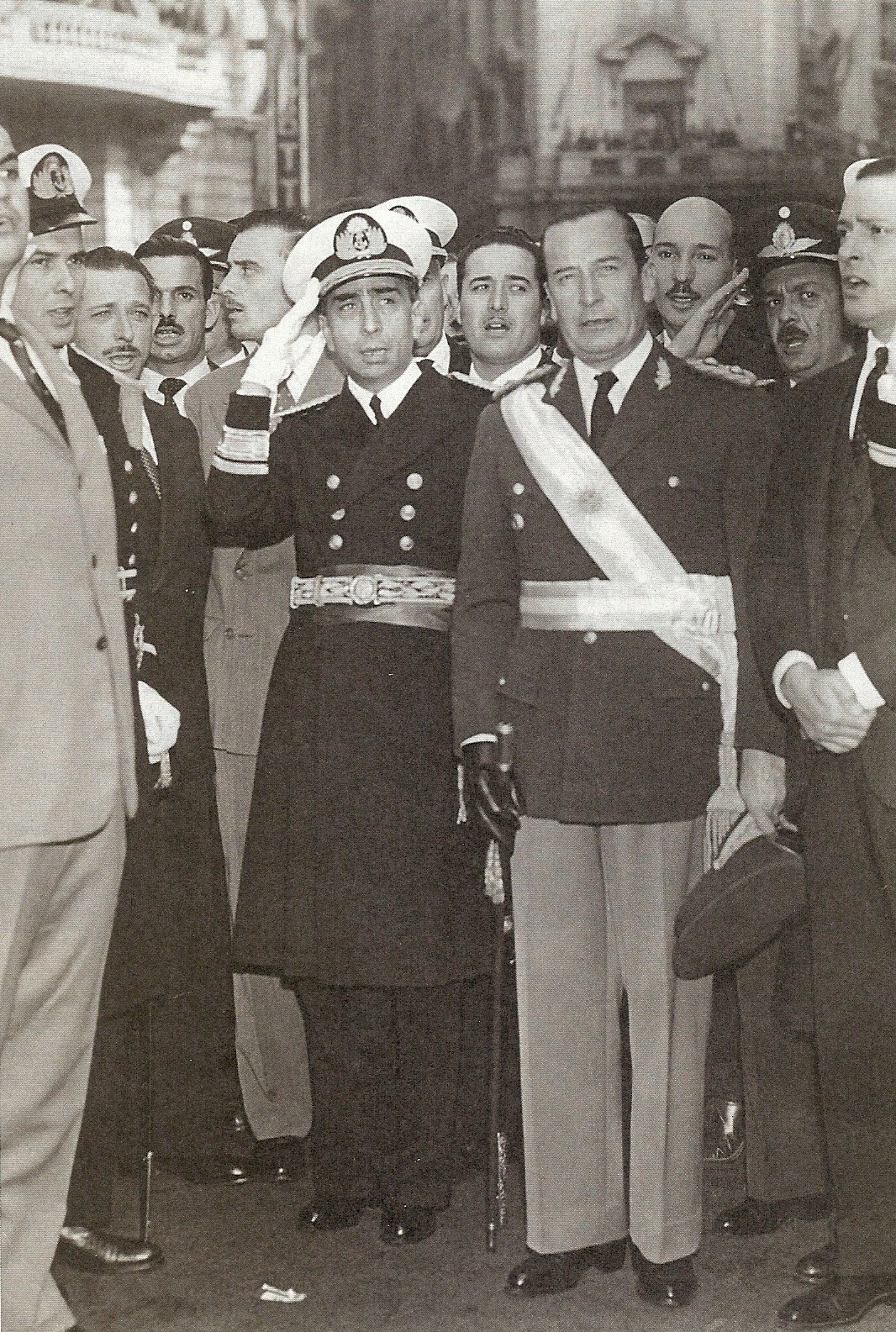
The Argentine military backed Aramburu's call for a constitutional assembly.

Neither victors nor vanquished were to emerge from the Revolución Libertadora ("Liberating Revolution") that violently deposed Argentina's populist President Juan Perón in September 1955, and despite the pressure against it, General Eduardo Lonardi's catchphrase became government policy in October: he negotiated personally with Perón's chief supporters, the 2.5 million-member CGT labor union, and formed the Civilian Advisory Council.

Facing conservative opposition to his moderate approach to "de-perónization," as well as terminal illness, Lonardi lost his battle with both; replaced in November, he died the following March. His successor, General Pedro Aramburu, jailed 9,000 CGT leaders within days (banning them from politics) and enacted restrictions such as the ban of mentioning Peron's name. Instability and a coup attempt contributed to a rollback in this momentum, however, and in July, Aramburu announced elections for an "asamblea constituyente"("constituent assembly," as Argentines call constitutional conventions), to be convened for the purpose of restoring the Argentine Constitution of 1853 to its original text and meaning(as was amended in 1860, 1866, & 1897, respectively), which Perón had heavily amended to a more statist and populist charter, in 1949).

The announcement was not without controversy, however. The centrist UCR, the dominant party following the Peronists' ban, was opposed to convening the assembly before the restoration of democracy (when the UCR would almost certainly be in power). One front runner, Arturo Frondizi, believed it to be Aramburu's attempt to forestall elections, and the more conservative Ricardo Balbín feared it could boost Argentina's myriad, smaller parties – potentially complicating the UCR's ability to govern.

Aramburu's more reactionary colleagues in the military favored a far slower timetable towards elections, but were reluctant to challenge him. The UCR's November 1956 convention in Tucumán was marked by acrimony over relationships with the military and with peronists, and it resulted in the party's division. Balbín continued to lead the party's mainstream (as the UCR-P), while the less anti-peronist faction formed the UCRI – led by Oscar Alende and Balbín's 1951 running mate, Arturo Frondizi. The two UCR factions competed not only with each other, but also with the many, smaller parties. One of the most prominent, the Socialist Party of Argentina, suffered from its own internal divisions. Américo Ghioldi led those who supported retribution for the harassment that had been inflicted on them during Perón's rule, while Alfredo Palacios opposed such action. The elections – the first since Perón's deposal – were narrowly "won" by blank votes: Voters cast about 2,116,000 of these, besting the UCR-P's total by 10,000 and resulting in one of the highest such incidences (25%) in Argentine electoral history.

Ultimately, the narrowly divided convention in Santa Fe resulted in deadlock when the UCRI walked out over the imminent reinsertion of Perón's Constitutional Article 40 (which nationalized energy resources). His Article 15 – which included social guarantees – was approved, however, before the assembly was adjourned after two months, on November 14.

== Results ==
Party	Votes	%	Seats
People's Radical Civic Union	2,106,524	32.15	75
Intransigent Radical Civic Union	1,847,603	28.20	77
Socialist Party	525,721	8.02	12
Christian Democratic Party	420,606	6.42	9
Democratic Party	333,749	5.09	7
Democratic Progressive Party	263,805	4.03	5
Communist Party	228,821	3.49	2
Federal Union	159,177	2.43	1
Labour Party	93,172	1.42	2
Independent Civic Party	86,442	1.32	1
Conservative Party	76,976	1.17	1
Workers' Party	58,965	0.90	1
People's Party	50,912	0.78	0
Liberal Party of Corrientes	47,862	0.73	2
Conservative People's Democratic Party–Autonomist Democratic Party	40,269	0.61	2
Blockist Radical Civic Union	30,968	0.47	2
Conservative People's Democratic Party	25,036	0.38	1
Liberal Democratic Party	24,206	0.37	2
Federal Labour Party	20,254	0.31	1
Provincial Union	11,265	0.17	1
Conservative People's Democratic Party–Democratic Party	9,689	0.15	1
Provincial Defense–White Flag	8,928	0.14	0
Christian Democratic People's Union	8,413	0.13	0
Federalist Radical Civic Union	8,250	0.13	0
Autonomist Democratic Party – Provincial Committee	8,195	0.13	0
Labour Gathering Party	7,932	0.12	0
Republican Union	6,829	0.10	0
National Labour Party	6,511	0.10	0
Public Health Party	5,783	0.09	0
Intransigent Radical Civic Union – Radical Recovery Movement	5,491	0.08	0
Agrarian Social Party	5,411	0.08	0
Nationalist Civic Union	4,742	0.07	0
Radical Civic Union – Provincial Committee	3,936	0.06	0
Liberal Party of Misiones	2,941	0.04	0
Antipersonalist Party	2,636	0.04	0
Formosa Democratic Party	2,401	0.04	0
Agrarian Labour Party	975	0.01	0
Total	6,551,396	100.00	205
Valid votes	6,551,396	75.27	
Invalid votes	36,066	0.41	
Blank votes	2,115,861	24.31	
Total votes	8,703,323	100.00	
Registered voters/turnout	9,662,620	90.07	
Source: Zalduendo
