= Rogelio Julio Frigerio =

Argentine economist, journalist and politician

Rogelio Frigerio
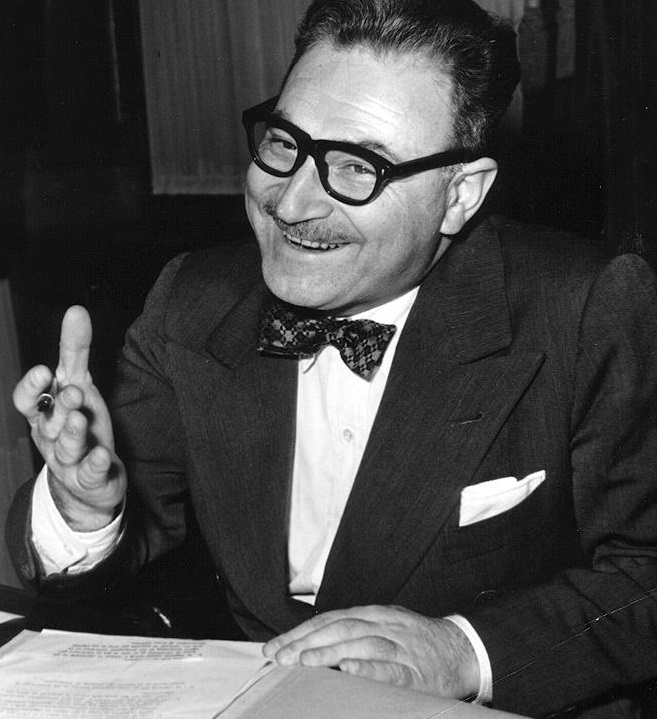
- Born: Rogelio Julio Frigerio; November 2, 1914; Buenos Aires, Argentina
- Died: September 13, 2006 (aged 91); Buenos Aires, Argentina
- Resting place: La Recoleta Cemetery, Buenos Aires
- Spouse: Noemí Blanco

Academic background
- Education: University of Buenos Aires
- Influences: Karl Marx; Raúl Prebisch; Hans Singer; Celso Furtado

Academic work
- School or tradition: Structuralist economics
- Institutions: Government of Argentina 1958–1962
- Notable ideas: Developmentalism
- Awards: Konex Award

Notes
- Children: Octavio; Alicia; María Carmen; Mario; Alejandro, religion: Roman Catholicism

Rogelio Julio Frigerio (November 2, 1914 – September 13, 2006) was an Argentine economist, journalist and politician.

== Background and early career ==
Rogelio Frigerio was born in Buenos Aires in 1914 to Gerónimo Frigerio, an Italian immigrant, and his wife Carmen Guanziroli. One of eight brothers, he grew up in the quiet residential neighborhood of Villa del Parque and enrolled at the University of Buenos Aires.

Pursuing higher studies at the university's School of Economics, he helped found Insurrexit, a Marxist student association and, as one of its leaders, he edited the group's newsletter, Claridad. Graduating in 1935, he soon distanced himself from the Argentine left, however, believing them to harbor an elitist disposition.

Establishing a wholesale distributorship with diversified interests in lumber, textiles, leather and minerals, in 1940 he married Noemí Blanco, with whom he had five children. A talented businessman, Frigerio nonetheless remained politically active, involving himself in intellectual circles and establishing a newsweekly in 1946, Qué pasó en siete dias ("What Happened in Seven Days"). Alienated by the magazine's staunch opposition to the new populist Administration of Juan Perón, however, Frigerio left its editorial board shortly before Perón had the magazine shuttered in 1947.

Though he did not seek public office during the Perón era, Frigerio became a highly visible proponent of accelerated industrial growth and social progress, a combination of policies he described as developmentalism. Inspired by recent efforts in that direction such as Brazilian President Getúlio Vargas' Estado Novo and U.S. President Franklin D. Roosevelt's New Deal, Frigerio's concern that Perón's similar policies might be reversed following the populist leader's violent 1955 overthrow led him to re-open his former newsmagazine in 1956, naming it simply Qué. Qué soon attracted prestigious contributors from Argentine intellectual life such as Arturo Jauretche, Raúl Scalabrini Ortiz, Jorge Sabato and Arturo Frondizi. Frondizi, the centrist Radical Civic Union (UCR)'s 1951 vice presidential nominee, soon developed a close friendship with Frigerio.

== Developmentalism and Arturo Frondizi ==
Frigerio, in 1956, secretly arranged a meeting with Perón and his closest adviser at the time, John William Cooke, an erstwhile Communist who, imprisoned for his prominence in the Perón government, had recently escaped his remote Patagonia prison cell.

Exiled in Venezuela and subjected to numerous assassination attempts ordered by the new regime in Argentina, Perón continued to exert considerable political influence in his homeland; as Argentine voters geared for the 1958 elections, the exiled leader's Justicialist Party was barred from fielding even local candidates (the mere mention of Perón's name was illegal). Following the secret meeting in Caracas, however, Perón endorsed Arturo Frondizi, instructing his supporters to vote for their former opponent and forego casting blank ballots, as a number of Peronists were advocating. Failing to secure the UCR nomination, Frondizi ran on a splinter ticket, whose party he named the Intransigent Radical Civic Union (UCRI). Enjoying Perón's support, Frondizi's UCRI handily defeated the mainstream UCR candidate, Ricardo Balbín, by about 1.5 million votes out of 9 million cast.

Arturo Frondizi was inaugurated President of Argentina on May 1, 1958, and designated Frigerio Secretary of Socio-Economic Affairs, a secondary post in the critical Economics Ministry the new president was forced to offer Frigerio due to steadfast opposition from the Argentine military and the U.S. Embassy, both of whom saw Frigerio as a veiled Marxist because of his activities as a young man. President Frondizi, even so, gave Frigerio informal say over a broad swath of economic policy.

Frondizi and Frigerio inherited a difficult economic situation: following a 1946-48 boom, GDP had grown by a modest 3% a year in the decade since. Declining exports and a growing need for costly imported motor vehicles, machinery and fuel, moreover, had caused Argentina to run trade deficits in seven out the past ten years. Unable to finance these easily, Frondizi's two predecessors, Perón and Pedro Aramburu, resorted to "printing" money to cover the nation's yawning current account deficits, causing prices to rise around sixfold. Frigerio, whom U.S. interests in Argentina suspected of being a Communist, believed that the only sustainable remedy for this was the encouragement of foreign direct investment into Argentina, particularly in energy and industry — the sectors accounting for most of the country's trade deficits.

Almost upon his appointment, Frigerio drafted the Law of Foreign Investment, promptly signed by the president. This law gave incentives and tax benefits to both local and foreign corporations willing to develop Argentina's energy and industry sectors and created the Department and Commission of Foreign Investments, which was designed to give foreign investors more legal recourse. Frigerio's plans were ambitious, calling for greatly expanded public lending for homebuilders and local industry, and public works investment.

Frigerio also promulgated large petroleum exploration and drilling contracts with foreign oil companies. These gave interested participants a generous share of the profits from such activities, provided these were carried out in conjunction with the Argentine state oil concern, YPF. As a consequence of investments initiated during the next four years, the profile of a number of sectors in the Argentine economy were revolutionized by the early 1960s:

- oil production — which, in the 1950s, covered less than half of Argentina's oil needs — tripled to 16 million m^{3}, almost eliminating the need for imports, while refining capacity more than doubled and synthetic rubber output leapt by fivefold.
- auto production — which had covered about half of Argentina's new auto market of about 40,000 units yearly — leapt to 136,000 units in 1961, eliminating the need for imports (save for luxury vehicles). Tractor production more than doubled.
- steel and cement — almost all of which still had to be imported — grew to a million tons of annual steel production (half the market at the time) and five million tons of cement (the entire market).
- electric output — which, though increasing, was so inadequate most industrial production depended on generators — nearly doubled.
- access to indoor plumbing and running water — which, despite Perón's efforts, covered only half of all households — increased to about two-thirds in a few years.
- paved roads — covering no more than 10,000 km (6,000 mi) — doubled in length in four years. Ten regional airports were also opened.

The availability of consumer durables like washing machines, refrigerators, ovens, appliances and television sets all also increased sharply, as local and foreign investors soon broke ground on factories making all these goods and many more. One fourth of all foreign direct investment into Argentina between 1912 and 1975 took place in the Frondizi years, and the nation's chronic trade deficits, for their part, vanished by 1963.

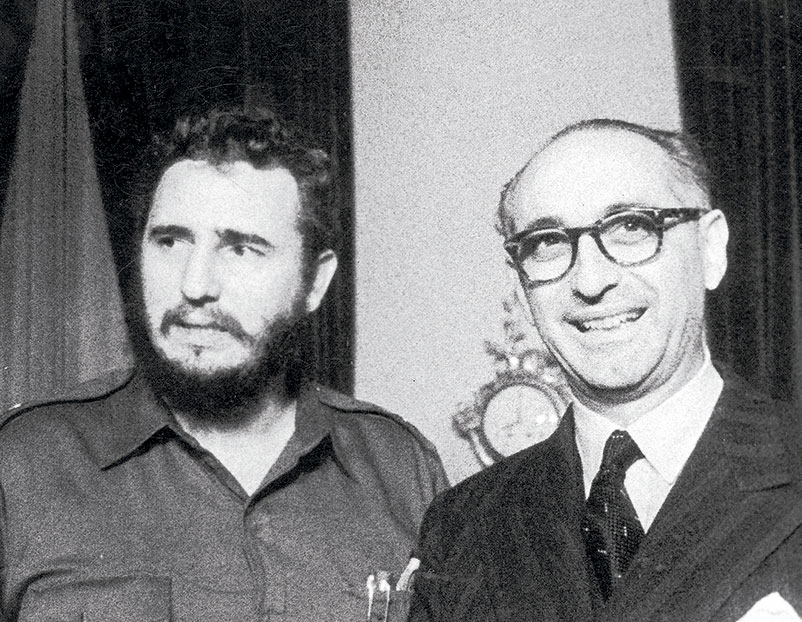
President Arturo Frondizi hosts Cuban leader Fidel Castro in 1959, before Castro allied himself with the USSR. Frondizi's attempts to mediate the U.S.-Cuba dispute resulted in his overthrow.

Partly the victim of bad timing, these policies did not earn either Frondizi or Frigerio the respect of the most powerful institution in Argentina at the time: the armed forces and in December, Frondizi was forced to remove Frigerio from his post. One of the policy makers behind this was a relatively unknown defense contractor named Alvaro Alsogaray, whose austerity plan Frondizi was forced to implement, causing a sudden doubling of consumer prices and, consequently, a fall in GDP and widespread protest. Alsogaray made frequent television appearances publicizing his plan; during the first of these, he declared that the Argentine people "must go through winter."

Relegated to informal adviser to the president, Frigerio opposed Alsogaray's belt-tightening measures and increasingly unpopular, Alsogaray's influence quickly waned; in early 1961, he resigned. Again influencing economic policy from his informal role, Frigerio's close working relationship with the president continued until, on March 28, 1962, Arturo Frondizi was deposed while attending a Western Hemisphere summit in Montevideo, Uruguay in hopes of mediating the conflict between the U.S. and Fidel Castro's Cuba. Arrested upon his return to the Casa Rosada the following morning, Frondizi defiantly pronounced that he would "not resign, nor commit suicide, or leave the country," the president was imprisoned and Frigerio, exiled in Uruguay.

== Frigerio and politics ==
Returning to Buenos Aires in 1963, Frigerio was reunited with Arturo Frondizi, now free. Believing that their past economic accomplishments had made a return to politics possible, the two friends founded the Integration and Development Movement (MID). MID was barred from the 1963 elections due to military opposition and serious differences over strategy resulted in an open enmity between UCRI candidate Oscar Alende (the progressive former governor of the Province of Buenos Aires and Frondizi ally) and the MID, which opted to encourage its supporters to cast blank ballots. But many of Frigerio's policies were reinstated by the newly elected President Arturo Illia. Policy differences over Frondizi-era oil contracts, which Illia rescinded, led the MID to actively oppose him, however. Many of their policies endured following the 1966 coup, particularly during the 1970-71 tenure of Economy Minister Aldo Ferrer. Frigerio became a significant shareholder in Argentina's largest news daily Clarín following a 1971 deal made with the news daily's owner, Ernestina Herrera de Noble, whose late husband, Clarín founder Roberto Noble, had supported Frondizi. Perón's return from exile imminent, the MID opted to endorse the aging leader for the 1973 elections, believing Perón would give them a meaningful say in the nation's economic policy.

Given little say by the new Peronist government, which, instead saw its policy shift from populism to erratic crisis management measures, Frigerio initially supported the 1976 coup against Perón's successor (his hapless widow, Isabel Perón); what ensued, however, was unlike the last military regime in that this dictatorship adopted policies largely anathema to Frigerio's. Freezing wages for prolonged stretches, deregulating financial markets and encouraging a flood of foreign debt and of imports, these policies all helped undo much of what Frondizi and Frigerio had accomplished twenty years earlier. Though Frigerio and his supporters were not targeted in the way left-wing dissidents were, the MID's opposition to the regime's chief economist, José Alfredo Martínez de Hoz and his policies earned a number of party officials death threats and forced exile.

Allowing elections in 1983, the dictatorship left an insolvent Argentina, its business and consumer confidence almost shattered and its international prestige damaged following the 1982 Falklands War, an invasion Frigerio opposed. Taking up the MID's nomination for president in his first campaign for high office, Frigerio, however, refused to condemn the regime's human rights atrocities, something which deprived his longshot 1983 MID candidacy of needed support. Rogelio Frigerio fared poorly on election night, October 30, 1983 and, elected by an ample margin, UCR leader Raúl Alfonsín left Frigerio out of the economic policy discussions he held before taking office on December 10. Frigerio succeeded Frondizi as President of the MID in 1986.

Lacking representation in Congress, the MID maintained a considerable following in a number of Argentine provinces. In the Province of Formosa, where voters had fond memories of the Frondizi Administration's development projects, Frigerio leveraged this influence into an agreement with Justicialist Governor Floro Bogado for his support of developmentalist policies and a MID candidate for Congress in exchange for the MID's alliance with them in Formosa and in nearby Misiones Province, helping the Peronists wrest control of the Misiones Governor's office from the UCR in 1987. Frigerio negotiated something similar in the other end of the country, the Province of Santa Cruz; electing two MID councilwomen to the Río Gallegos City Council, Frigerio advised them to support Peronist candidates. These two city districts gave Justicialist Mayoral candidate Néstor Kirchner the deciding margin of victory in local elections in 1987 and Mayor Kirchner went on become governor and, in 2003, President of Argentina.

Having written thirty books and numerous articles concerning the Argentine economy, he was sidestepped by the Administration of Raúl Alfonsín and his policies were only partly adopted by the Administration of Carlos Menem and by Economy Minister Domingo Cavallo, whose reforms attracted foreign investment and helped lead to a sorely needed modernization of Argentine industry; Menem-era privatizations, however, yielded very mixed results and the combination of downsizing and higher productivity led to an increase in unemployment after 1992 that Frigerio felt was not being addressed. He became distanced from the MID leadership, though he continued to contribute as a commentator (particularly in Clarín, Argentina's leading news daily). Frigerio lost his friend, Arturo Frondizi, to Parkinson's disease in 1995, and his own health declined subsequently. Many of his ideas became national policy after a profound economic crisis bottomed out in 2002.

Possessing an affable, self-effacing personality, he was known for his taste for whisky and broccoli and affectionately referred to as the "tapir", for his robust, compact frame. The Buenos Aires City Legislature, on August 31, 2006, voted to bestow on him the title of Illustrious Citizen of the city for his contributions to national development, the public discourse and the common cause. Scheduled to receive the recognition later that month, Rogelio Frigerio died in his Belgrano neighborhood home on September 13, 2006, at the age of ninety-one. His widow, Noemí, and his son, Octávio, accepted the recognition the following day and the renowned economist's body lay in state at the City Legislature.

== Bibliography ==
- Belenky, Silvia. Frondizi y su tiempo. Buenos Aires: Centro Editor de Latinoamerica, 1984.
- Díaz, Fanor; Frigerio, Rogelio (1977). Conversaciones con Rogelio Frigerio: sobre la crisis política argentina. Colihue/Hachette.
- Frigerio, Rogelio (1984). Desarrollo y subdesarrollo económicos. Paidós. ISBN 978-950-12-7179-9.
- Frigerio, Rogelio. Los cuatro años (1958–1962). Buenos Aires: Editorial Concordia, 1962.
- Frigerio, Rogelio (1983). Diez años de la crisis argentina: diagnóstico y programa del desarrollismo. Sudamericana/Planeta. ISBN 978-950-37-0009-9.
- Frondizi, Arturo (1983). Qué es el Movimiento de Integración y Desarrollo. Buenos Aires: Editorial Sudamericana. ISBN 978-950-07-0165-5.
