= 1958 Argentine general election =

- 23 February 1958
- Presidential election

466 members of the Electoral College 234 votes needed to win
- Registered: 10,002,327
- Turnout: 90.60%
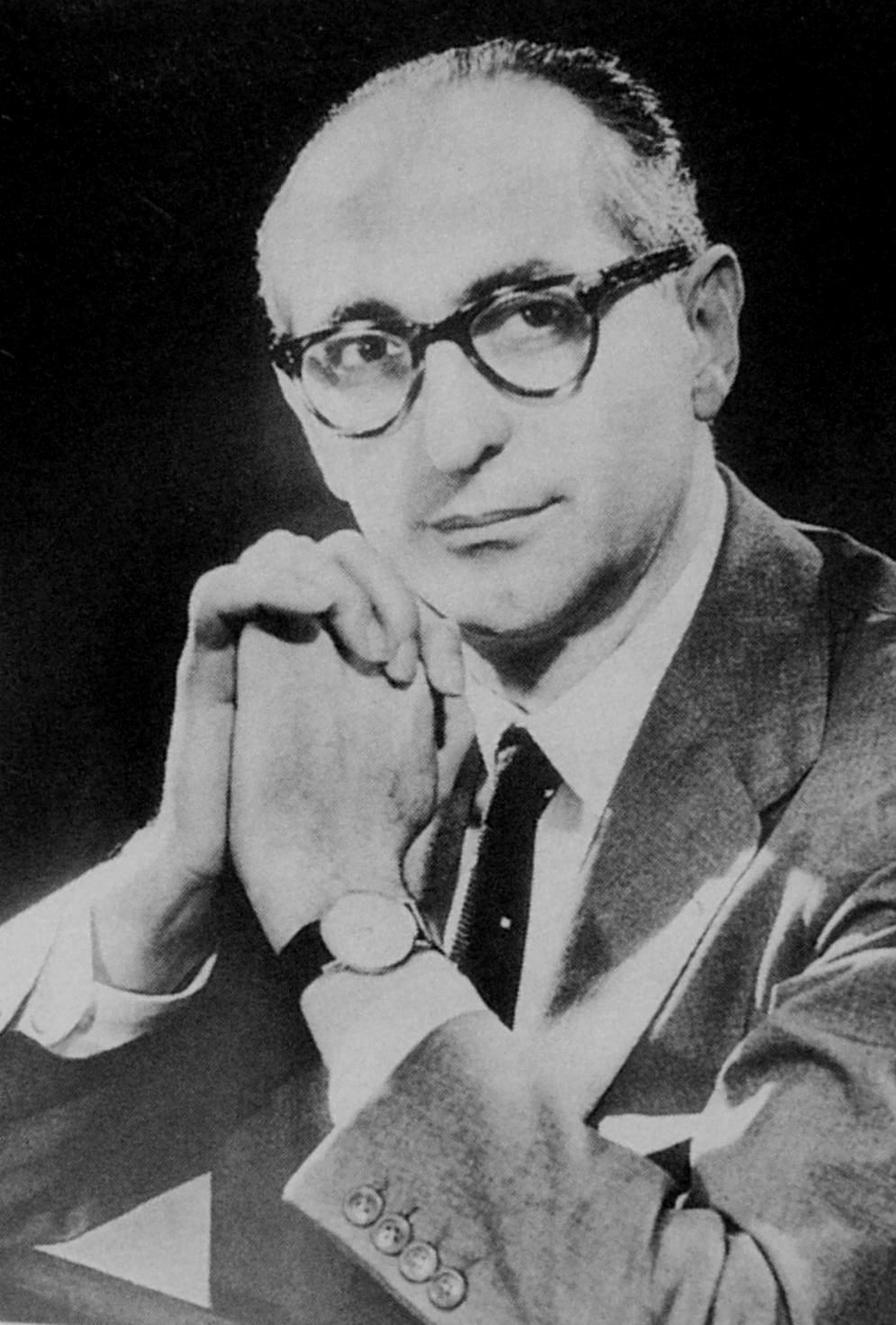

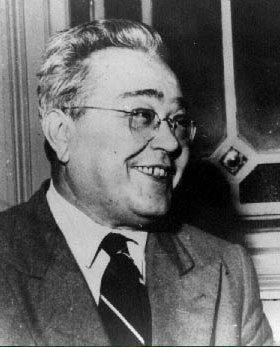
Candidate	Arturo Frondizi	Ricardo Balbín
Party	UCRI	UCRP
Running mate	Alejandro Gómez	Santiago del Castillo
Electoral vote	318	135
Popular vote	4,070,398	2,617,693
Percentage	49.49%	31.83%
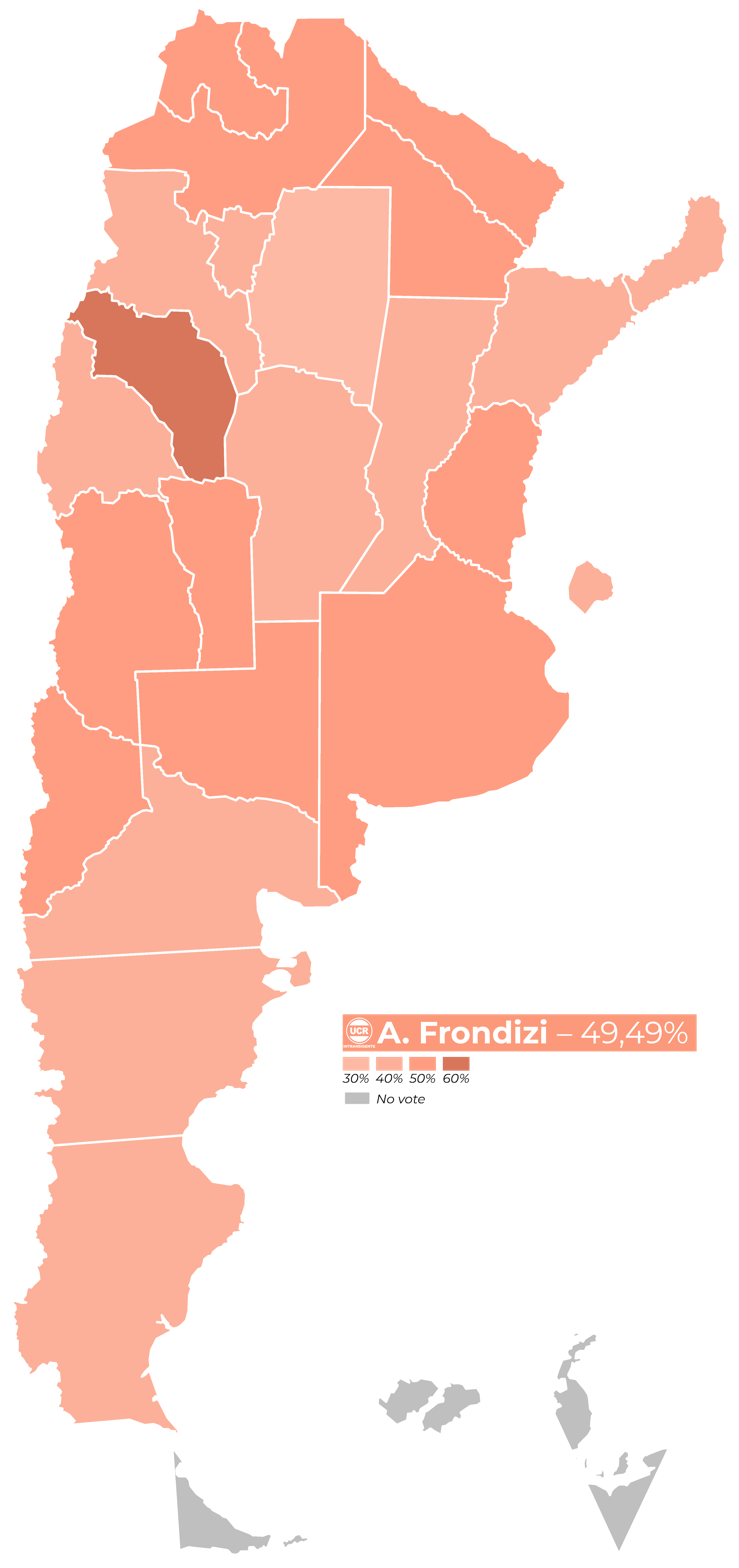
- Results by province
President before election
Pedro Eugenio Aramburu
Elected President
Arturo Frondizi
UCRI
- Legislative election
- All 187 seats in the Chamber of Deputies; 94 seats needed for a majority
- Turnout: 90.82%
Party	Vote %	Seats
Intransigent Radical Civic Union	45.66	133
People's Radical Civic Union	27.86	52
Liberal Party of Corrientes	0.62	2
This lists parties that won seats. See the complete results below.
Results by province

General elections were held in Argentina on 23 February 1958. Voters chose both the President and their legislators and with a turnout of 90.6% (the highest in Argentine electoral history).

== Background ==
The year 1955 cast a long shadow over these elections. President Juan Perón was violently overthrown in September of that year and the succeeding junta banned the Peronist Party and even the possession of Peronist mementoes or the very mention of the former leader or of the late Eva Perón. The junta did, however, convene a Civilian Advisory Board which, to the dismay of many conservatives, recommended against draconian measures or the reversal of most of Perón's reforms. They also called for a referendum ratifying the 1853 Constitution (which Perón had heavily amended in 1949), while retaining Perón's Article 15, a section devoted to social reforms; the junta's leader, Gen. Pedro Aramburu, backed the panel's findings. An attempted countercoup against the junta, defeated on June 10, led to the execution of 27 plotters (including numerous civilians) and derailed Aramburu's hopes for the creation of a viable political alternative to the populist leader.

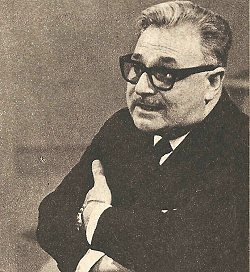
Businessman Rogelio Julio Frigerio, who secured Perón's endorsement of Frondizi in 1956, thus determining the outcome of the elections.

Seizing the opportunity, the Radical Civic Union (UCR)'s 1951 vice-presidential nominee, Arturo Frondizi secretly secured an agreement with the exiled Perón, by which the banned Peronists would be given a voice in exchange for their support. The pact, a mere rumor at the time, created a rift within the UCR at their party convention in November 1956, forcing Frondizi and his supporters to run on a splinter ("Intransigent") ticket and leaving more anti-Peronist UCR voters with Ricardo Balbín, the party's 1951 standard bearer. The two wings presented different candidates for the constituent assembly election called for July 28, 1957, with no clear winner, though the deadlocked assembly did ratify the Advisory Board's proposed constitutional changes.

Unmentionable by law, Perón became the central issue of the 1958 campaign. Argentina was abuzz with the staccato sounds of El-qué-te-dije (roughly translated to "You know who"), as he opposed Balbín, who accepted Pres. Aramburu's endorsement as the candidate of the ruling junta. Balbin, and his Radical Civic Union of the People, was dealt a "February surprise" when, four days before the election, the exiled leader publicly announced his endorsement of Frondizi. Blank votes (Peronist voters' choice during the assembly elections of 1957, which they narrowly "won") became Frondizi votes, making him the winner of the 1958 elections in Argentina.

== Candidates ==
- Intransigent Radical Civic Union (progressive): Former Deputy Arturo Frondizi of Corrientes Province
- Popular Radical Civic Union (centrist): Former Deputy Ricardo Balbín of Buenos Aires Province
- Christian Democratic Party (progressive): Lucas Ayarragaray
- Socialist Party: Former Senator Alfredo Palacios of the city of Buenos Aires
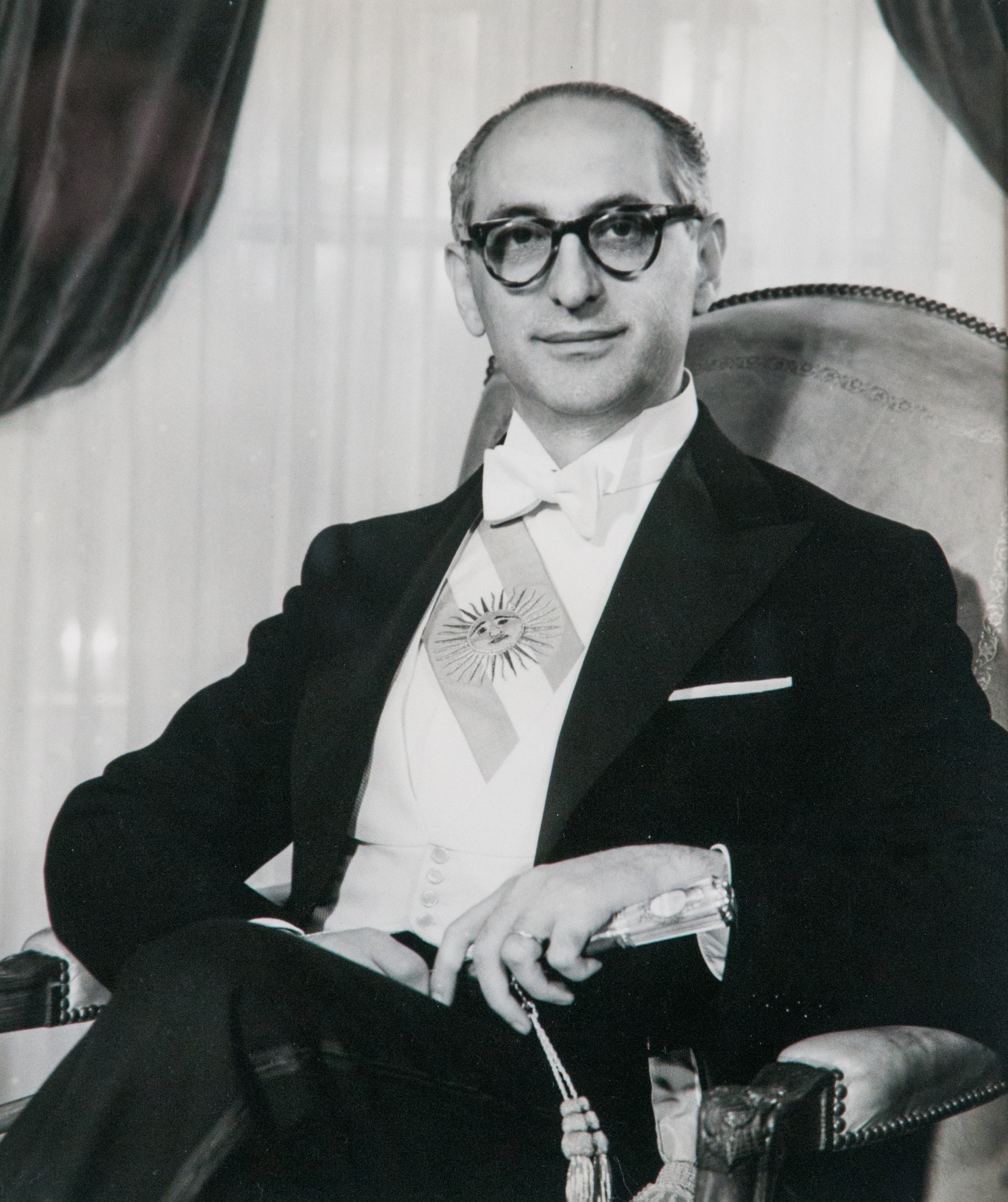
Frondizi

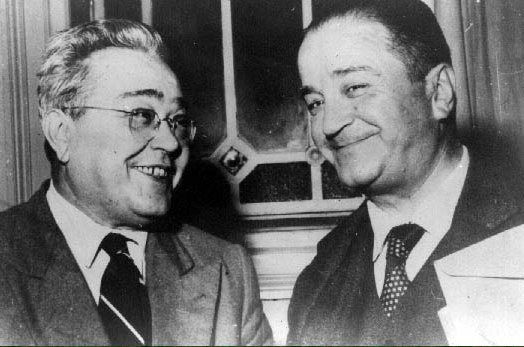
Balbín (left)

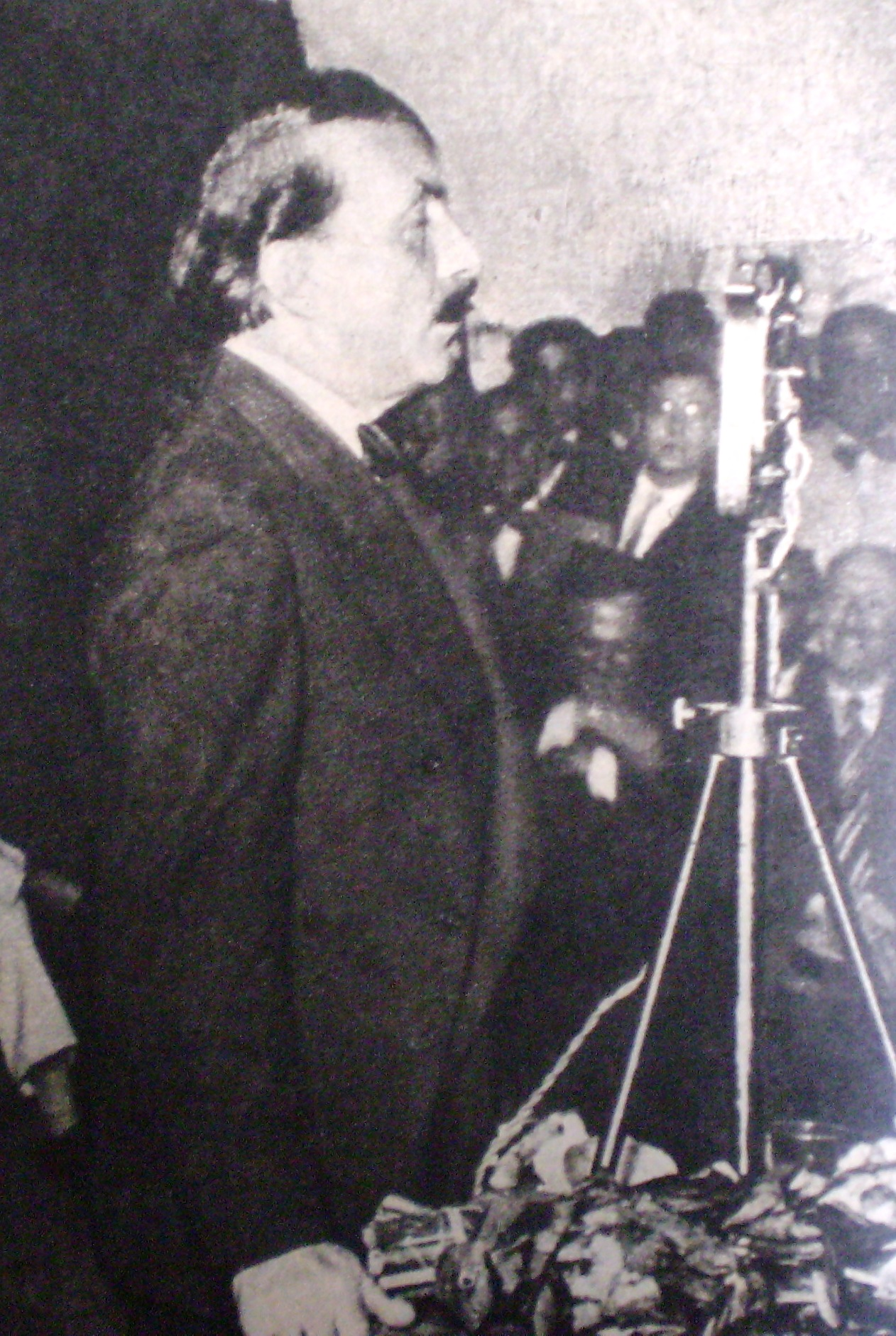
Palacios

== Results ==
=== President ===
Candidate	Running mate	Party	Popular vote		Electoral College		Electoral vote	
Candidate	Running mate	Party	Votes	%	Votes	%	Votes	%
Arturo Frondizi	Alejandro Gómez	Intransigent Radical Civic Union	4,070,398	49.49	319	68.45	318	69.43
Ricardo Balbín	Santiago del Castillo	People's Radical Civic Union	2,617,693	31.83	140	30.04	135	29.48
Lucas Ayarragaray Jr.	Horacio Sueldo	Christian Democratic Party	285,650	3.47				
Alfredo Palacios	Carlos Sánchez Viamonte	Socialist Party	264,721	3.22				
Héctor González Iramain	Carlos Aguinaga	Democratic Party	145,935	1.77				
Reynaldo Pastor	Martín Aberg Cobo	Conservative Democratic People's Party	128,226	1.56				
Luciano Molinas	Horacio R., Thedy	Democratic Progressive Party	126,991	1.54				
Alejandro H. Leloir	Juan Atilio Bramuglia	Popular Union	80,712	0.98				
Ernesto Meabe	José Brouchou	Liberal Party of Corrientes	51,092	0.62	5	1.07	5	1.09
Vicente Solano Lima	Alfredo Massi	Conservative People's Party	49,784	0.61				
		White Party	40,820	0.50				
Juan Bautista Peña	Ana Zaefferer de Goyeneche	Independent Civic Party	39,157	0.48				
		Populist Popular Union	32,119	0.39				
		Red and White Intransigent Radical Civic Union	31,987	0.39				
Juan José Tartara	Paulina Schnaider	People's Party	30,957	0.38				
		Conservative Party	30,239	0.37				
		Traditional Blockist Radical Civic Union	22,371	0.27				
		Chaco Alliance (PDP–PS)	22,338	0.27				
		Labour Party	20,358	0.25				
		Worker's Party	16,876	0.21				
		Liberal Democratic Party	16,611	0.20	2	0.43		
Basilio Serrano	Juan de Zan	Federal Union	12,996	0.16				
		Provincial Union	10,722	0.13				
		People's Workers Party and Social Reconstruction	10,378	0.13				
		Conservative Democratic Party	10,328	0.13				
		Provincial Defence–White Flag	9,296	0.11				
		Populist Party	7,596	0.09				
		Renewal and Intransigent Radical Civic Union	7,581	0.09				
Alejandro Gancedo Jr.		Antipersonalist Radical Civic Union	7,141	0.09				
		UCR-Blockist–PCP	6,120	0.07				
		People's Federal Labour Party	4,427	0.05				
		Autonomist Democratic Party	2,700	0.03				
		Blue and White Party	2,593	0.03				
		Formosa Democratic Party	2,364	0.03				
		National Labour Party	2,170	0.03				
		Federal Agrarian Labour Party	1,342	0.02				
Rafael Claudeville	Romeo F. Restano	Renewal Party	661	0.01				
		Social Workers Party	608	0.01				
		Liberal Party of Misiones	273	0.00				
		Communist Party of Argentina	42	0.00				
Total			8,224,373	100.00	466	100.00	458	100.00
Valid votes			8,224,373	90.76			458	100.00
Invalid votes			22,724	0.25			0	0.00
Blank votes			814,802	8.99			0	0.00
Total votes			9,061,899	100.00			458	100.00
Registered voters/turnout			10,002,327	90.60			466	98.28
Source: Cantón, Ministry of Interior, Nohlen

=== Chamber of Deputies ===
Party	Votes	%	Seats		
Party	Votes	%	1958–1960	1958–1962	Total
Intransigent Radical Civic Union	3,773,841	45.66	66	67	133
People's Radical Civic Union	2,302,467	27.86	26	26	52
Socialist Party	521,337	6.31	0	0	0
Christian Democratic Party	328,753	3.98	0	0	0
Communist Party	196,790	2.38	0	0	0
Democratic Progressive Party	166,479	2.01	0	0	0
Democratic Party	157,929	1.91	0	0	0
Conservative Democratic People's Party	124,708	1.51	0	0	0
Popular Union	85,220	1.03	0	0	0
Independent Civic Party	52,314	0.63	0	0	0
Liberal Party of Corrientes	51,211	0.62	1	1	2
White Party	41,543	0.50	0	0	0
Conservative Autonomist Democratic People's Party	36,794	0.45	0	0	0
Conservative Party	32,677	0.40	0	0	0
Popular Union-Populist Party	32,655	0.40	0	0	0
Intransigent Radical Civic Union (Red and White)	31,630	0.38	0	0	0
People's Party	30,536	0.37	0	0	0
Chaco Alliance (PDP–PS)	24,973	0.30	0	0	0
Republican Union	23,559	0.29	0	0	0
Blockist Radical Civic Union (Traditional)	23,100	0.28	0	0	0
Labour Party	20,601	0.25	0	0	0
Populist Party	18,001	0.22	0	0	0
Liberal Democratic Party	17,467	0.21	0	0	0
Conservative People's Party	17,133	0.21	0	0	0
Workers' Party	16,940	0.20	0	0	0
Federal Union	15,844	0.19	0	0	0
Conservative Democratic Party	12,155	0.15	0	0	0
Provincial Defence–White Flag	11,875	0.14	0	0	0
Worker's Party	11,717	0.14	0	0	0
Provincial Union	11,689	0.14	0	0	0
Principist Radical Civic Union	10,282	0.12	0	0	0
Santa Fe Radical Civic Union	9,774	0.12	0	0	0
Antipersonalist Radical Civic Union	8,033	0.10	0	0	0
Renewal and Intransigent Radical Civic Union	7,961	0.10	0	0	0
Blockist Radical Civic Union (Provincial Committee)	5,844	0.07	0	0	0
Intransigent Radical Civic Union (Green List)	5,705	0.07	0	0	0
Autonomist Democratic Party	5,196	0.06	0	0	0
People's Federal Labour Party	4,491	0.05	0	0	0
Social Agrarian Party	4,266	0.05	0	0	0
Blue and White Party	2,637	0.03	0	0	0
Formosa Democratic Party	2,413	0.03	0	0	0
National Labour Party	2,172	0.03	0	0	0
Federal Agrarian Labour Party	1,343	0.02	0	0	0
Renewal Party	669	0.01	0	0	0
Socialist Workers Party	615	0.01	0	0	0
Santa Cruz Regionalist Movement	338	0.00	0	0	0
Liberal Party of Misiones	272	0.00	0	0	0
Authentic Radical Civic Union	263	0.00	0	0	0
Total	8,264,212	100.00	93	94	187
Valid votes	8,264,212	90.98			
Invalid/blank votes	819,433	9.02			
Total votes	9,083,645	100.00			
Registered voters/turnout	10,002,218	90.82			

=== Provincial Governors ===
Election of Provincial Governors
Elected positions: 22 provincial governors, 23 legislative bodies Presidential Appointment: Mayor of the City of Buenos Aires and Territorial Governor of Tierra del Fuego
Province	Elected	Party	Map
Buenos Aires	Oscar Alende	Intransigent Radical Civic Union	
Catamarca	Juan Manuel Salas	Intransigent Radical Civic Union	
Chaco	Anselmo Zoilo Duca	Intransigent Radical Civic Union	
Chubut	Jorge Galina	Intransigent Radical Civic Union	
Córdoba	Arturo Zanichelli	Intransigent Radical Civic Union	
Corrientes	Fernando Piragine Niveyro	Intransigent Radical Civic Union	
Entre Ríos	Raúl Lucio Uranga	Intransigent Radical Civic Union	
Formosa	Luis Gutnisky	Intransigent Radical Civic Union	
Jujuy	Horacio Guzmán	Intransigent Radical Civic Union	
1960: La Pampa	Ismael Amit	Intransigent Radical Civic Union	
La Rioja	Herminio Torres Brizuela	Intransigent Radical Civic Union	
Mendoza	Ernesto Ueltschi	Intransigent Radical Civic Union	
1960: Misiones	César Napoleón Ayrault	Intransigent Radical Civic Union	
Neuquén	Ángel Edelman	Intransigent Radical Civic Union	
Río Negro	Edgardo Castello	Intransigent Radical Civic Union	
Salta	Bernardino Biella	Intransigent Radical Civic Union	
San Juan	Américo García	Intransigent Radical Civic Union	
San Luis	Alberto Domeniconi	Intransigent Radical Civic Union	
Santa Cruz	Mario Paradelo	Intransigent Radical Civic Union	
Santa Fe	Carlos Sylvestre Begnis	Intransigent Radical Civic Union	
Santiago del Estero	Eduardo Miguel	Intransigent Radical Civic Union	
Tucumán	Celestino Gelsi	Intransigent Radical Civic Union	
Federal Capital (Appointment)	Hernán M. Giralt	Intransigent Radical Civic Union	
Tierra del Fuego (Appointment)	Ernesto Manuel Campos	Intransigent Radical Civic Union	
