= Intransigent Party =

Left wing political party in Argentina

Intransigent Party Partido Intransigente
- Abbreviation: PI
- President: Enrique Gustavo Cardesa
- Founder: Oscar Alende
- Founded: 24 June 1972
- Preceded by: Intransigent Radical Civic Union
- Headquarters: Buenos Aires
- Ideology: Democratic socialism Progressivism
- Political position: Left-wing
- National affiliation: Homeland Force
- Regional affiliation: COPPPAL; São Paulo Forum
- Colors: Red, Black
- Slogan: La izquierda popular en el frente
- Seats in the Chamber of Deputies: 1 / 257
- Seats in the Senate: 0 / 72

Website
- www.pi.org.ar

The Intransigent Party (Spanish: Partido Intransigente) is a leftist political party in Argentina, founded in 1972 by Oscar Alende. Its membership came from the Intransigent Radical Civic Union, one of the two factions of the Radical Civic Union.

== History ==
The party was for a long time allied with Peronism in elections. Alende was presidential candidate under the banner in 1973 and 1983, without much success.

The party had its most successful period in 1985, becoming the third-largest party. It fell into oblivion after allying with the Justicialist Party from 1987.

The party was part of the Front for a Country in Solidarity (FrePaSo) coalition from the 1990s and entered government in 1999 as part of the Alianza between FrePaSo and the Radical Civic Union that brought Fernando de la Rúa to the presidency. The Alianza collapsed in 2001 and FrePaSo effectively disappeared.

For the 2003 Presidential Election, the Intransigent Party was allied to ARI, the party of Elisa Carrió, supporting her for President, and allowing her to be candidate (because her party did not have members in all the provinces). For 2005 legislative elections, the Intransigent Party allied with the Broad Front, Socialist Party and the Communist Party of Argentina, forming the coalition called Encuentro Amplio.

In 2007, the Party backed the Front for Victory and Cristina Fernández de Kirchner as candidate for President of Argentina.

The party was part of the Frente de Todos coalition that supported presidential candidate Alberto Fernández during the 2019 Argentine general election until its dissolution in 2023.

It is now part of the Unión por la Patria coalition, formed in 2023 to support Sergio Massa's presidential campaign.
