= Ricardo Balbín =

Argentine lawyer and politician

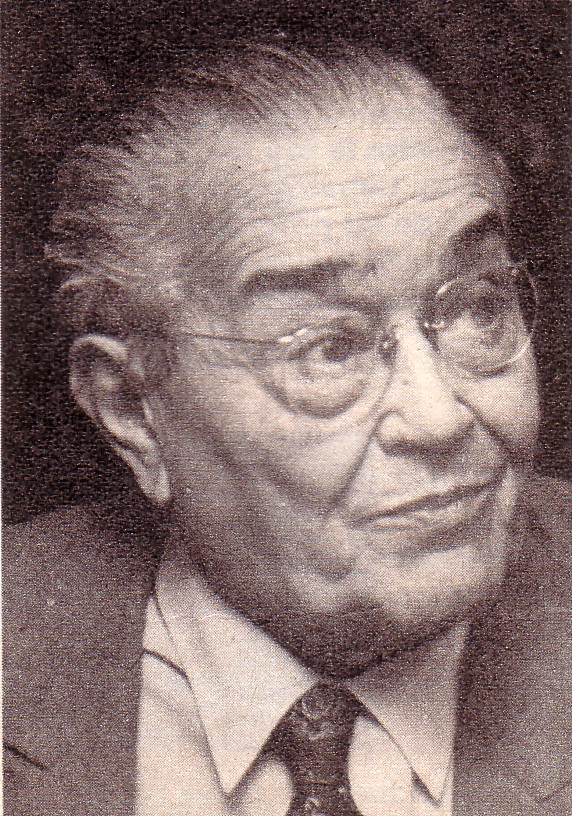

President of the National Committee of the Radical Civic Union
- In office 24 June 1972 – 9 September 1981
- Preceded by: Himself (UCRP); Oscar Alende (UCRI)
- Succeeded by: Carlos Raúl Contín

National Deputy
- In office 4 June 1946 – 4 June 1950
- Constituency: Buenos Aires

Personal details
- Born: 29 July 1904 Buenos Aires, Argentina
- Died: 9 September 1981 (aged 77) La Plata, Argentina
- Resting place: La Plata Cemetery
- Party: Radical Civic Union
- Other political affiliations: People's Radical Civic Union (1957–1972)
- Spouse: Indalia Ponzetti (m. 1928)
- Education: University of La Plata
- Occupation: Lawyer and leader of the UCR
- Ricardo Balbín's voice Recorded c. 1960-70

Ricardo Balbín (29 July 1904 – 9 September 1981) was an Argentine lawyer and politician, and one of the most important figures of the centrist Radical Civic Union (UCR), for which he was the presidential nominee four times: in 1951, 1958, and twice in 1973.

== Early life and career ==
Ricardo Balbín was born to Encarnación Morales Balbín and Cipriano Balbín in the city of Buenos Aires, in 1904. The family moved first to Azul and later to Ayacucho when he was still a child. His mother had to be moved to Spain in 1909 to treat a serious illness.

Balbín enrolled in high school in 1916 at the Colegio San José in La Plata. He began his university studies in medicine in 1921; but he left school shortly afterward due to financial difficulties. Balbín joined the ruling Radical Civic Union (UCR) in 1922, and moved to La Plata, where the student atmosphere gave him the incentive to enroll in the National University of La Plata Law School. He obtained a juris doctor in 1927. He married Indalia Ponzetti in 1928, and they had a daughter and two sons: Lía Elena, Osvaldo and Enrique Balbín. The year he married was also one of active political participation for Balbín, who worked on the presidential campaign that returned Hipólito Yrigoyen to the presidency. During Yrigoyen's second term, Balbín was named District Attorney during the federal intervention in Mendoza Province.

== Political career ==
Shortly afterward Balbín returned to La Plata and was elected president of La Plata's Sección Primera Committee in 1930, the year in which General José Félix Uriburu's coup d'état toppled Yrigoyen. In 1931 the military government called elections, and Balbín was elected congressman for Buenos Aires Province, and Honorio Pueyrredón governor of the province. The UCR victory was not expected by the military government, who instead invalidated the results. Balbín was again elected to Congress in 1940; but he resigned his seat in protest at the fraudulent nature of those elections. In 1945 he participated in the foundation of the Movimiento de Intransigencia y Renovación (MIR) together with, among others, Amadeo Sabattini, Arturo Frondizi, Crisólogo Larralde, Oscar Alende, Moisés Lebensohn, and Arturo Illia.

Balbín was elected National Deputy in 1946 and he became chief deputy of the so-called "Block of the 44" (Bloque de los 44). His role as one of the opposition leaders to Juan Perón's government brought him political and judicial prosecution. He was expelled from congress in 1949, and was imprisoned at the Olmos Penitentiary in La Plata. He was released in 1950, but was sent back to jail the very same day of the election for which he was candidate for governor of Buenos Aires Province. At the end of that year Perón granted him a pardon, but Balbín refused to accept it since he had not yet been sentenced.

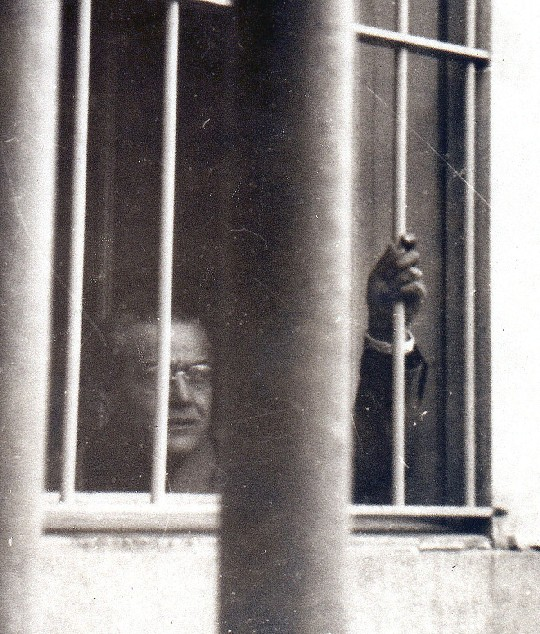
Balbín in prison, 1950.

Once freed, Balbín was nominated presidential candidate for the 1951 national elections with Arturo Frondizi as candidate for vice-president. Perón was re-elected in a landslide, however, and Balbín was again imprisoned in 1954. A 1955 coup d'état known as the Revolución Libertadora forced Perón into exile and banned Peronism. The UCR divided into two groups following its 1956 convention: the Intransigent Radical Civic Union (UCRI) with Arturo Frondizi and Oscar Alende as the main exponents, and Balbín's Popular UCR (UCRP). The UCRP chose Balbín as presidential candidate for the 1958 elections, with Santiago del Castillo for vice-president. Arturo Frondizi won with support from factions of the outlawed Peronists.

In 1959 the UCRP chose Arturo Illia as its next presidential candidate, who won the 1963 elections with Carlos Perette as vice-president. Illia only governed until 1966, however, when General Juan Carlos Onganía's coup removed him from the presidency. Following an escalation of political violence Balbín, together with sections of several political parties, issued a manifesto on November 11, 1970, calling for a 'return to legality' in a document entitled 'Without a political solution there can be no economic solution' (Sin solución política es impensible una solución económica).

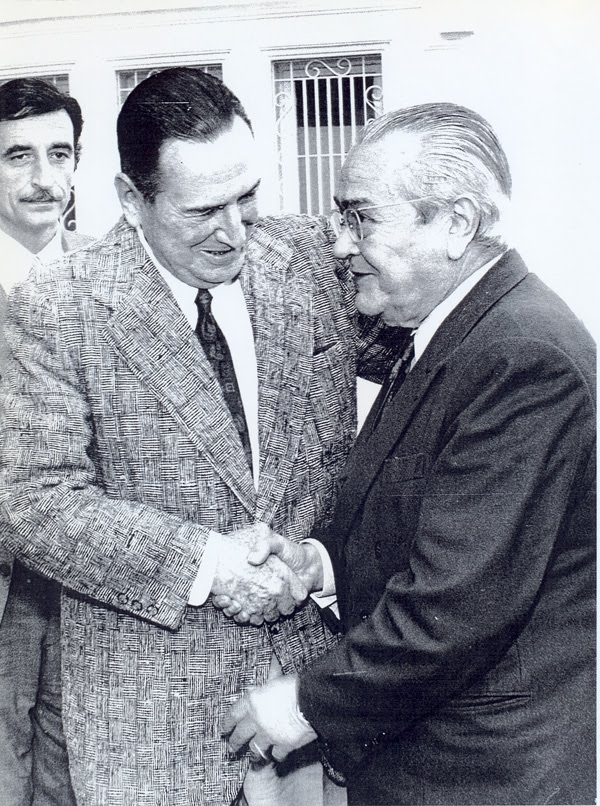
Balbín with Perón in 1972.

Following President Alejandro Lanusse's call in 1972 for free elections, Balbín was again nominated presidential candidate for the UCR over Raúl Alfonsín, with Senator Eduardo Gamond as his running mate. At the end of that year Perón returned from exile and met Balbín, promising to resolve historical differences to preserve the popular movement. On March 11, 1973, Peronism once again defeated Balbín, and Héctor Cámpora was elected president as a stand-in for the exiled Perón. Following the definitive return of Perón to Argentina in June, the governing body resigned and snap elections were called for September. Balbín was a presidential candidate for a fourth and last time, with Fernando de la Rúa as his vice-presidential candidate. Perón won in a landslide with his wife Isabel Perón as vice-president.

== Later life and death ==
Perón died on July 1, 1974, and Balbín dedicated a warm eulogy to him. He remained focused on avoiding yet another military coup throughout Mrs. Perón's chaotic presidency; but by February 1976 Balbín desisted, confiding in Army Chief of Staff General Jorge Videla, "If you're planning to stage a coup, do so as soon as possible - expect no applause from us, but no obstacles either." The coup took place on 24 March 1976, bringing about the military government known as the National Reorganization Process. During this dictatorship, Balbín was criticized for not denouncing unprecedented human rights violations taking place amid the Dirty War against both violent and non-violent dissidents. Balbín died in La Plata in September 1981; even though political demonstrations were illegal, a crowd gathered at his funeral to give him a last farewell.

A monument in his honor was unveiled near Congress in 1999 and National Route 1 was named after him in 2004; the expressway connects Buenos Aires with his adopted city, La Plata.
