= Oscar Alende =

Argentine politician (1909–1996)

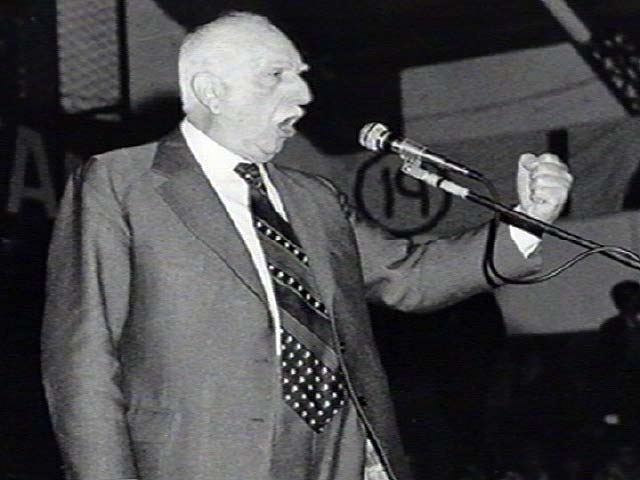

Governor of Buenos Aires
- In office 2 May 1958 – 20 March 1962
- Preceded by: Emilio A. Bonnecarrere
- Succeeded by: Jorge Bermúdez Emparanza

National Deputy
- In office 10 December 1985 – 22 December 1996
- Constituency: Buenos Aires
- In office 4 June 1952 – 21 September 1955
- Constituency: Buenos Aires

Personal details
- Born: 6 July 1909 Maipú, Buenos Aires Province, Argentina
- Died: December 22, 1996 (aged 87) Buenos Aires
- Party: Radical Civic Union (until 1957); Intransigent Radical Civic Union (1957–1966); Intransigent Party (1972–1996)
- Profession: Physician

Oscar Eduardo Alende (6 July 1909 – 22 December 1996) was an Argentine politician who founded the Intransigent Party.

Alende was born in Maipú, Buenos Aires Province. He studied medicine at the University of La Plata, where he led the student union, and completed his medical studies at the University of Buenos Aires in 1933. He became head of gastro-intestinal surgery at Rawson Hospital, and a member of the Argentine Surgical Academy. He was co-founder of the Argentine Committee of Assistance to Republican Spain.

In 1948 Alende became a provincial legislator in Buenos Aires Province for the Radical Civic Union (UCR), heading the UCR block from 1950. In 1952 he became a deputy in the Argentine Chamber of Deputies, serving until its dissolution in 1955.

Alende had joined the breakaway Intransigent Radical Civic Union (UCRI). In 1958 he was elected Governor of Buenos Aires Province and served until 1962. Alende became the leader of the UCRI following the 1962 overthrow of President Arturo Frondizi (who broke with the party), and stood as UCRI candidate for president in the 1963 elections. In 1972 he founded the Intransigent Party, the military having banned the use of the name UCRI. He stood once again for president in 1973 on behalf of the Popular Revolutionary Alliance.

After the return of democracy in 1983, Alende became president of the Intransigent Party and stood again for president. He was re-elected to the Chamber of Deputies in 1985, and served in that capacity until his death in 1996.

| Preceded by Emilio Bonnecarrere | Governor of Buenos Aires; 1958–1962 | Succeeded by Jorge Bermudez Emparanza |
