= Autonomist Party of Corrientes =

Argentinian political party

The Autonomist Party of Corrientes (Spanish: Partido Autonomista de Corrientes) is a liberal provincial political party in Corrientes Province, Argentina.

== History ==
It is the claimed successor of the National Autonomist Party in the Province of Corrientes.
