= Intransigent Radical Civic Union =

Intransigent Radical Civic Union Unión Cívica Radical Intransigente
- Abbreviation: UCRI
- President: Rogelio Frigerio (last)
- Founder: Arturo Frondizi
- Founded: 10 February 1957
- Dissolved: 24 June 1972
- Split from: Radical Civic Union
- Succeeded by: Intransigent Party
- Headquarters: Buenos Aires
- Ideology: Radicalism; Progressivism; Social democracy Developmentalism
- Political position: Centre-left

The Intransigent Radical Civic Union (Spanish: Unión Cívica Radical Intransigente, UCRI) was a political party of Argentina.

The UCRI developed from the centrist Radical Civic Union (UCR) in 1956, following a split at the party's convention in Tucumán between the UCR's progressive faction, led by Arturo Frondizi, and its conservative faction, led by Ricardo Balbín, which renamed itself "People's Radical Civic Union" (Spanish: Unión Cívica Radical del Pueblo, UCRP). Receiving the endorsement of the exiled populist leader Juan Perón four days before the February 1958 general elections, UCRI presidential candidate Frondizi defeated UCRP presidential candidate Balbín by 17% and the party enjoyed a narrow majority in Congress. Following President Frondizi's forced resignation at the hands of the military, who objected to his political concessions towards Peronism and his close relations with Cuba, the UCRI President of the Senate, José María Guido, was appointed President of Argentina. A proposed Popular Front uniting banned Peronists, the UCRI and others dissolved ahead of the July 1963 general elections, when Buenos Aires Province Governor Oscar Alende developed objections to the inclusion of conservatives in the alliance. Frondizi, others in the UCRI and Perón instructed their supporters to cast blank ballots, leading to their highest incidence in the history of Argentine national elections. Governor Alende ran on the UCRI, but was unable to overcome the boycott, leading him to narrowly lose to UCRP candidate Arturo Illia, who was considered more centrist than Balbín. Afterwards, Frondizi and his chief economist while in office, Rogelio Julio Frigerio, left the UCRI in August to establish the Integration and Development Movement (MID), whose platform centered on economic growth.

In 1972, following discussions between dictator Alejandro Agustín Lanusse and Balbín looking to allow general elections in 1973, but at the same time avoid a Peronist victory, the military government officially awarded the name "Radical Civic Union" to the UCRP, forcing the UCRI to dissolve itself, after which a majority of UCRI affiliates (including Alende) founded the Intransigent Party as a continuation, while a minority joined the MID.

== See also ==
- List of political parties in Argentina
