= Segundo Storni =

Argentine sailor

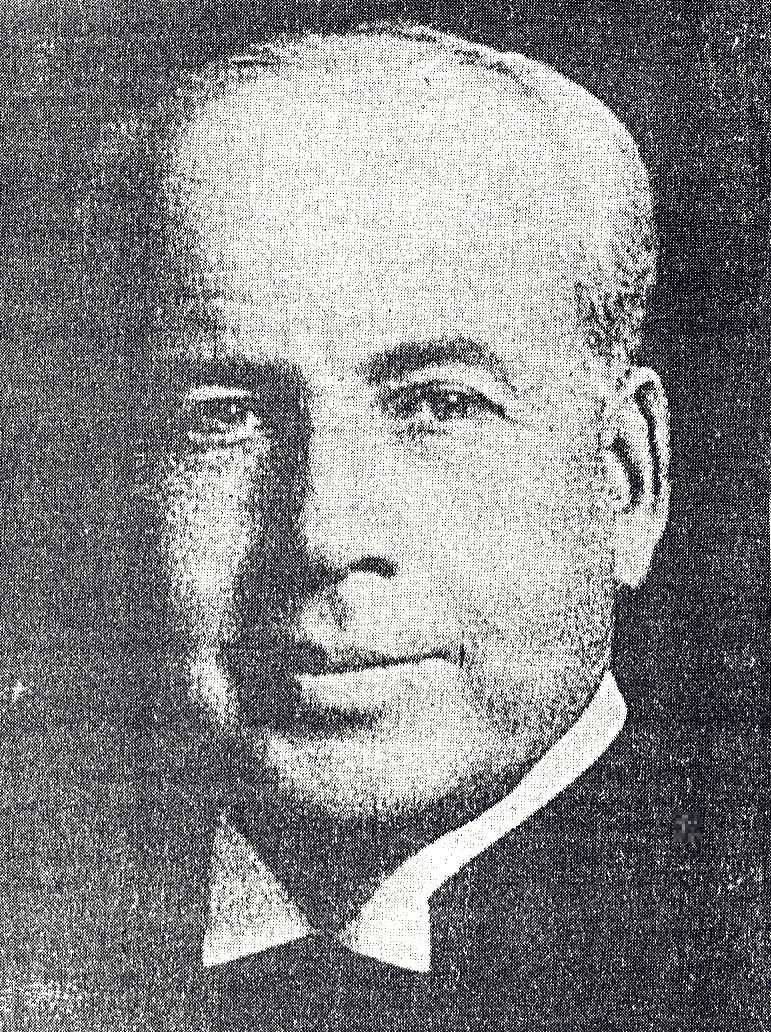

Minister of Foreign Affairs
- In office 7 June 1943 – 9 September 1943
- Preceded by: Enrique Ruiz Guiñazú
- Succeeded by: Alberto Gilbert

Personal details
- Born: 16 July 1876 Tucumán, Argentina
- Died: 4 December 1954 (aged 78)
- Education: Naval Military School

Segundo Rosa Storni (16 July 1876 in Tucumán – 4 December 1954) was an Argentine sailor who served as foreign minister during the presidency (de facto) of general Pedro Pablo Ramírez (1943–1944).

== Biography ==
Storni graduated 29 December 1894 from the Argentine Naval School. In 1916, he dictated two conferences of historical importance from which he developed a doctrine that claimed Argentine rights over the continental shelf of Argentina and all its resources. These two conferences were published for the first time that year as a book under the title Intereses Argentinos en el Mar [Argentine Interests in the Sea].

In the 1930s Storni was part of the group of soldiers who promoted the development of the national industry, considering it fundamental for defense. He was one of the founders, along with Adolfo Holmberg, Ezequiel Paz and Ángel Gallardo, of the Argentine Oceanographic Institute in Mar del Plata. In this regard, Storni had a more comprehensive vision, which included the need to develop maritime interests in relation to maritime transport by their own hand and the fishing industry, with all its supporting industries. In 1935 he was one of the founders of the National Academy of Sciences of Buenos Aires.

The coup d'état of June 4, 1943 that ousted President Ramón Castillo gave rise to the Revolution of 43. General Arturo Rawson became president but because of lack of military support to some of his chosen cabinet members he had to resign three days later. General Pedro Pablo Ramírez then assumed the presidency with vice admiral Sabá H. Sueyro as vice president. Segundo Storni was appointed Minister of Foreign Affairs, serving between June 7 and September 10 of 1943. It was a very important position at that time, due to the Second World War and the pressures of the United States for Argentina to enter the war.

Storni was one of the few Argentine military men at the time who had sympathy for the United States where he had lived for several years. Although he was a nationalist, he was also “pro-allies" (aliadófilos) and a supporter of Argentina entering the war. To signal this, on August 5, 1943, he wrote a personal letter to US Secretary of State, Cordell Hull. He said it was Argentina's intention to break relations with the Axis powers, but he also asked for patience in creating this rupture and that at the same time some gesture of the United States in the matter of the supply of armaments was needed to isolate the "neutrals" (neutralistas). Cordell Hull, in order to put pressure on the Argentine government, made public the letter of Storni, also questioning in harsh terms the "neutralism" of Argentina. This produced a resurgence of the already strong anti-American sentiment, especially in the Armed Forces, leading to the resignation of Storni and his replacement by a "neutralist", Colonel Alberto Gilbert, who until then served as Minister of Interior.

== Works ==
In 1916 he published Intereses argentinos en el mar [Argentine Interests in the Sea], an important reference work on defense and maritime interests, based on his lecture delivered the same year.

Other published works were: Hydrographic works and Argentine limit in the Beagle Channel (1905); Ballistics and explosives for the navy (1908); Project of the regime of the territorial sea (1911) and The territorial sea (1926); and Geostrategy Manual .

== Tributes ==
On December 16, 1974, by Provision No. 1630 of the then General Command of the Navy, the Military Naval Lyceum "Almirante Storni" was created, located in the city of Posadas, in the province of Misiones. The idea arises from the need to strengthen the Argentine sovereignty in one in such a particular border area, in which the extension of the international limits surpass several times that of the interprovincial. In this context ARMEDINA ARGENTINA established the Lyceum in the aforementioned city, paying tribute to those who struggled for the dissemination of the maritime and fluvial interests of the Republic.

Resolution No. 1103/08 of the Ministry of Defense, signed by Minister Nilda Garré, ordered that the Navy Shipyard Argentina "Manuel Domecq Garcia" be renamed "Admiral Segundo Storni" in tribute.

== Day of Argentine interests at sea ==
On the initiative of the Argentine Naval League, the National Congress of Argentina declared the birthday of Segundo Storni, July 16, as the Day of Argentine Interests in the Sea, through Law 25,860, promulgated on January 8, 2004.

== Bibliography ==
- Ferrero, Roberto A. (1976). Del fraude a la soberanía popular [From fraud to popular sovereignty]. Buenos Aires: La Bastilla.
- Potash, Robert A. (1981). El ejército y la política en la Argentina; 1928-1945 [The army and politics in Argentina; 1928-1945]. Buenos Aires: Sudamericana.
- Troncoso, Oscar A. (1976). «La revolución del 4 de junio de 1943». Historia integral argentina; El peronismo en el poder [Argentine integral history; Peronism in power]. Buenos Aires: Centro Editor of Latin America.
- Tripolone, Gerardo (2015). «Geopolítica(s). Revistas de estudios sobre espacio y poder». Segundo Storni, el mar y la desespacialización de la política [Segundo Storni, the sea and the de-spatialization of politics] 6. 1: 137–152.

== See also ==
- Argentine navy
- Armed Forces of the Argentine Republic
- 1943 Argentine coup d'état
