= United Officers' Group =

Nationalist secret society in Argentina

- Grupo de Oficiales Unidos
- Symbol of the GOU
- Leaders: Juan Perón; Domingo Mercante
- Dates active: 1943–1945
- Merged into: Labour Party
- Country: Argentina
- Ideology: Nationalism; Anti-communism; Conservatism; Militarism; Corporatism; State interventionism Factions: Pro-Axis
- Political position: Center-right to far-right
- Part of: Argentine Army

The United Officers' Group (Spanish: Grupo de Oficiales Unidos) or GOU was a nationalist secret society within the Argentine Army which staged a coup d'état in 1943 to overthrow President Ramón Castillo, thus ending the Infamous Decade and forming a military junta which lasted until 1945. Arturo Rawson was made President, but was only in office for a few days before the GOU replaced him with Pedro Pablo Ramírez.

== History ==
The GOU started to operate at some stage in the early 1940s, after Colonel Juan Perón's return to Argentina from Europe in 1941. Peron's biographer writes in Yo, Juan Domingo Perón, that the people that came to join the GOU shared Peron's ideas about the promotion of trade unions and labor rights, and wanted to prevent further acts of electoral fraud in the manner of the Infamous Decade of 1930–1943. However, Perón was concerned that the GOU might merely aim at carrying out a coup d'état, without planning in advance the social changes they intended to implement.

As with most secret societies, secrecy makes historians' work difficult, and the specific details about the internal work of the society are unrecorded, incomplete or contradictory. Thus the formation of the GOU remains obscure: according to a report by Domingo Mercante, the GOU was set up by him and Perón, between the end of 1942 and May 1943, while Juan Carlos Montes claimed to be the creator with Lieutenant Colonel Urbano de La Vega. Both former members of the GOU did not point to any specific ideology as the point in common between members, but to the need to unite the officers opposed to Agustín Pedro Justo (1876-1943, President of Argentina from 1932 to 1938).

== Members ==
The original members of the GOU were 19 officers, without a chief. Other members joined later. The recorded list of original members is as follows, in the original order:

1. Domingo Mercante
2. Severo Eizaguirre
3. Raúl Pízzales
4. León Bengoa
5. Francisco Filippi
6. Juan Carlos Montes
7. Julio A. Lagos
8. Mario Villagrán
9. Fernando González
10. Eduardo Arias Duval
11. Agustín de la Vega
12. Arturo Saavedra
13. Bernardo Guillentegui
14. Héctor Ladvocat
15. Bernardo Menéndez
16. Urbano de la Vega Aguirre
17. Enrique P. González
18. Emilio Ramírez
19. Juan Domingo Perón

The officers that joined the GOU afterwards are as follows

1. Eduardo Jorge Avalos
2. Aristóbulo Mittelbach
3. Alfredo A. Baisi
4. Oscar Uriondo
5. Tomás Ducó
6. Heraclio Ferrazano
7. Alfredo Arguero Fragueyro

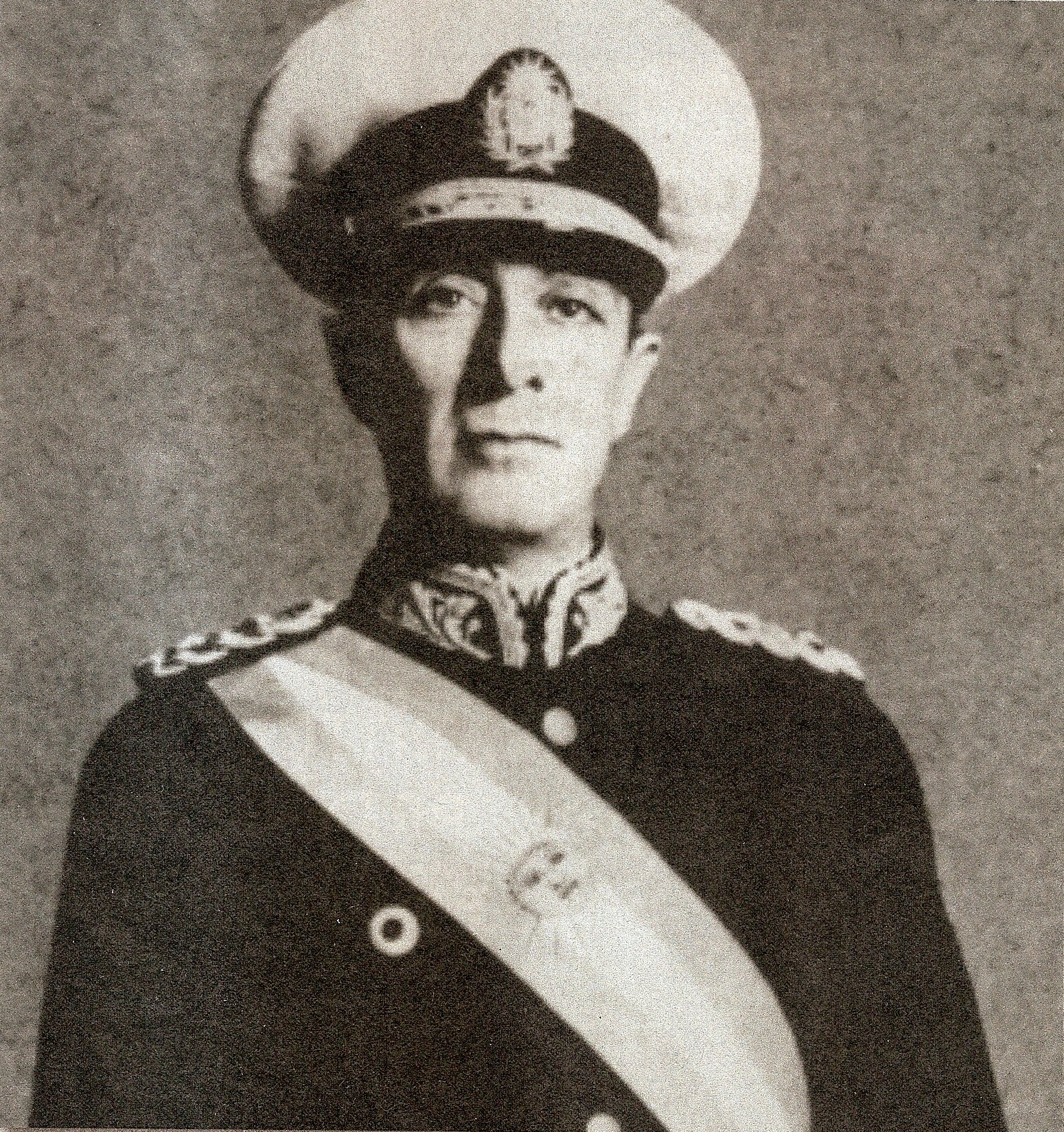
Pedro Pablo Ramírez, became President of Argentina in 1943 by the GOU's intervention.

Presidents Arturo Rawson, Pedro Pablo Ramírez and Edelmiro Farrell had close ties to the GOU, but were not members themselves.

== Nature of the GOU ==
Little information exists about the GOU. Felipe Pigna suggests that GOU members were nationalist sympathisers of Nazi Germany and Fascist Italy, but Noberto Galasso argues that there is no conclusive evidence for that in documents, reports or confirmed events. Silvano Santander wrote the book Technique of a treason (Spanish: Técnica de una traición) with documents that would prove that Juan Domingo Perón and Eva Perón were agents of Nazism. Uruguayan Eduardo Víctor Haedo was accused as well, which motivated an investigation by the Uruguayan Congress: it turned out that the documents used were forged. There is also a resolution supporting Adolf Hitler, but it is considered another forgery: none of the members of the GOU acknowledged it, and it was unsigned, whereas all GOU resolutions were signed.

On a general level, the military of Argentina was influenced by the German military, but this influence was dated from decades before the rise of Nazism. This influence was also limited to the military topics, and did not include the ideas of political organization.

== Bibliography ==
- Galasso, Norberto (2006). Perón: formación, ascenso y caída (1893-1955) (in Spanish). Buenos Aires: Colihué. ISBN 950-581-399-6.
- Potash, Robert A. (1984). Perón y el G.O.U.: Los documentos de una logia secreta. Editorial Sudamericana. ISBN 950-070-231-2.
