= Elbio Anaya =

Argentine general

Anaya, Elbio
- Born: 1889
- Died: 1986

Elbio Anaya (1889–1986) was an Argentine general who served as minister and secretary of state and one of the leaders of the Revolution 43.

== Biography ==
Being captain, he led, as second Lieutenant Colonel Héctor Benigno Varela, military repression against strikers in Patagonia in 1921, known as the Patagonia Rebelde (Tragic Patagonia). The historian Osvaldo Bayer argues that executions were ordered, but he has refused.

In 1943, he was head of the military garrison of Campo de Mayo, the largest in the country. He was one of the leaders of the military coup that originated in the June 4 Revolution of the 43, during which he served as Minister of Justice and Public Instruction in 1943 under the presidency of General Pedro Pablo Ramirez.

In 1959, during the presidency of Arturo Frondizi, he served as Secretary of War, in the Ministry of Defense. In that role, he clashed with the commander-in-chief of the Army, Lieutenant General Carlos Toranzo Montero, who wanted to form a politicized and strongly anti-Peronist army, generating a serious political crisis. Anaya dismissed Toranzo Montero from his position. Still, he resisted the measure, entrenching himself with 1,200 men in the School of Mechanics and reinstating himself in the position he had been laid off. The garrisons of Córdoba and Mar del Plata declared their adherence to the army of Toranzo Montero.

President Frondizi then ordered a tank attack against the rebel headquarters. However, a few minutes before the attack began, Frondizi suspended the order and demanded that Major General Anaya resign. Replaced by General Rodolfo Larcher, his first measure was to reinstate Toranzo Montero as Commander-in-Chief of the Army. From that moment, at the age of 70, Anaya withdrew from public life.

In 1972, he wrote the prologue to the book La conquista del Chaco, by Alberto D. Scunio, published by the Círculo Militar. He died in 1986 at the age of 97.

== Bibliography ==
- Mandatarios y gabinetes del territorio nacional (1776 - 2007), El Historiador, Director: Felipe Pigna
