= Torni =

Torni is a surname. Notable people with the surname include:

- Jacopo Torni, Italian painter
- Victoria Torni, First Lady of Argentina between 1944 and 1946

== See also ==
- Lauri Törni (1919–1965), Finnish military officer in the Finnish Army, Waffen-SS, and U.S. Army
