= Juan Pistarini =

Minister of Public Works of Argentina

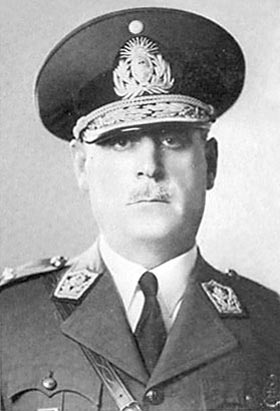

21st Vice President of Argentina
- In office October 10, 1945 – June 4, 1946
- President: Edelmiro Farrell
- Preceded by: Juan Perón
- Succeeded by: Hortensio Quijano

Minister of Public Works
- In office March 11, 1944 – June 4, 1952
- President: Edelmiro Farrell; Juan Perón
- Preceded by: Ricardo Vago
- Succeeded by: Roberto Dupeyron

Personal details
- Born: December 23, 1882 Victorica; La Pampa Province
- Died: May 29, 1956 (aged 73) Buenos Aires
- Profession: Army officer

Juan Pistarini (23 December 1882 – 29 May 1956) was an Argentine general and politician.

== Biography ==
Pistarini was born in the town of Victorica, La Pampa Province. He graduated from the National Military College with a degree in civil engineering, was promoted as army major by 1921, and became a close associate of the War Minister, General Agustín Justo. Justo was elected president in 1932, and appointed Pistarini Minister of Public Works in 1935. His first important initiative as minister was the proposed construction of a new international airport outside Buenos Aires. He was promoted to the rank of general in 1937 and, between then and 1940, was stationed in Germany and Italy. Appointed Director of Army Engineers upon his return, Pistarini recommended German contractors for public works in Argentina and was open regarding his Nazi and Fascist sympathies.

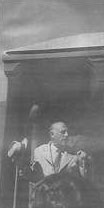
Pistarini during remarks made for the opening of the Salta-Antofagasta railway between Argentina and Chile in 1948.

His role in the 1943 coup d'état resulted in his appointment as director of the Campo de Mayo army training base. He was returned to the post of Minister of Public Works in March 1944 and served a brief, concurrent term as vice president following the populist Juan Perón's dismissal. Pistarini was retained as Public Works Minister by Perón when the latter was elected president in 1946, in which capacity he administered Perón's ambitious public works agenda. He oversaw and helped plan the construction or development of modern barracks, Argentina's first expressways, numerous public vacation resorts, 11,000 schools, water treatment plants, a modern merchant marine, 650,000 housing units and the planting of two million trees, the nation's first international airport, among other works. He also marshaled the dormant National Mortgage Bank to extend subsidized loans to new homeowners, often at interest rates well below inflation.

Ill health led to his retirement in June 1952 and following Perón's September 1955 overthrow, he had his property seized, was stripped of rank and imprisoned in Ushuaia. The sub-Antarctic climate in Ushuaia led to a worsening in Pistarini's health, and he was returned to Buenos Aires, where he died at a military hospital in 1956.

The Ministro Pistarini International Airport, opened in 1949 in Ezeiza, was named in his honor in 1985.

Political offices
Preceded by Juan Domingo Perón	Vice President of Argentina; 1945–1946	Succeeded by Hortensio Quijano
