= Edelmiro Julián Farrell =

23rd President of Argentina

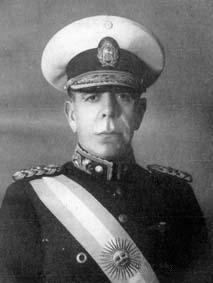

28th President of Argentina
- De facto
- In office Acting: 25 February 1944 – 9 March 1944
- In office 9 March 1944 – 3 June 1946
- Appointed by: Military junta
- Vice President: Himself; None (Mar–Jul 1944); Juan Domingo Perón (1944–1945); Juan Pistarini (1945–1946)
- Preceded by: Pedro Pablo Ramírez (de facto)
- Succeeded by: Juan Domingo Perón

19th Vice President of Argentina
- De facto
- In office 15 October 1943 – 9 March 1944
- President: Pedro Pablo Ramírez
- Preceded by: Sabá Sueyro (de facto)
- Succeeded by: Juan Domingo Perón (de facto)

Personal details
- Born: 12 February 1887 Lanús
- Died: 21 October 1980 (aged 93) Buenos Aires, Argentina
- Resting place: Cementerio de la Chacarita; Buenos Aires
- Party: Independent
- Spouse: Conrada Victoria Torni (1919–1977)
- Profession: Military
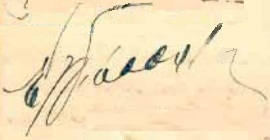
- Signature

Military service
- Allegiance: Argentina
- Branch/service: Argentine Army
- Years of service: 1907–1946
- Rank: Major general

Edelmiro Julián Farrell Plaul (Spanish: [eðelˈmiɾo faˈrel]; 12 February 1887 – 21 October 1980) was an Argentine general. He was the de facto president of Argentina between 1944 and 1946.

Farrell had a great influence on later Argentine history by introducing his assistant Juan Perón into government and paving the way for Perón's subsequent political career.

== Early life ==
He was born in 1887 in Villa de los Industriales (Lanús, Buenos Aires). He was the tenth son of Juan C. Farrell (1846–1887) and Catalina Plaul (1852–1917) and the grandson of Matthew Farrell (1803–1860) of County Longford, which was the family seat of the Farrell clan in Ireland as Lords of Annaly, and Mónica Ibáñez (1819–1867).

== Military career ==
Farrell graduated from Argentine military school in 1907 as an infantry sub-lieutenant. He served in an Italian alpine regiment in Fascist Italy between 1924 and 1926. He then returned to Argentina.

After the 1943 coup, Farrell was promoted to brigadier general and became vice-president during the military government of General Pedro Pablo Ramírez, who had deposed President Arturo Rawson. He was simultaneously Minister of War. Farrell appointed Juan Perón as his secretary.

== President ==
Ramírez named Farrell as president on 25 February 1944. Farrell appointed Perón as vice-president. After popular demonstrations in favour of Perón in 1945 made Perón the most influential and important man in the government, Farrell announced presidential elections for 1946, and Perón was elected. On 4 June 1946, Farrell was succeeded as president by Perón. Farrell had been his commander while Perón was a colonel.

Farrell declared war on Nazi Germany and the Empire of Japan on 27 March 1945 towards the end of World War II after pressure to get Argentina as part of the Allies after the Inter-American Conference on Problems of War and Peace.

== Family ==
He married on 10 July 1921, to Conrada Victoria Torni, a schoolteacher. They had three children: Nelly Victoria (1923–2023), Jorge Edelmiro (1925–1950), and Susana Mabel (1930–2020). Torni was only seen once serving in the role of first lady, separating from Farrell shortly after his oathtaking and moving to a rural estate in Mendoza Province.

== Death ==
A widower, he died in Buenos Aires in 1980.

== In popular culture ==
Farrell, in the movie Evita, is portrayed by British actor Denis Lill.

Political offices
Preceded by Sabá Sueyro	Vice President of Argentina; 1943–1944	Succeeded by Juan Perón
Preceded by Pedro P. Ramírez	President of Argentina; 1944–1946	Succeeded by Juan Perón
