= Domingo Mercante =

Argentine military officer and governor

Domingo A. Mercante
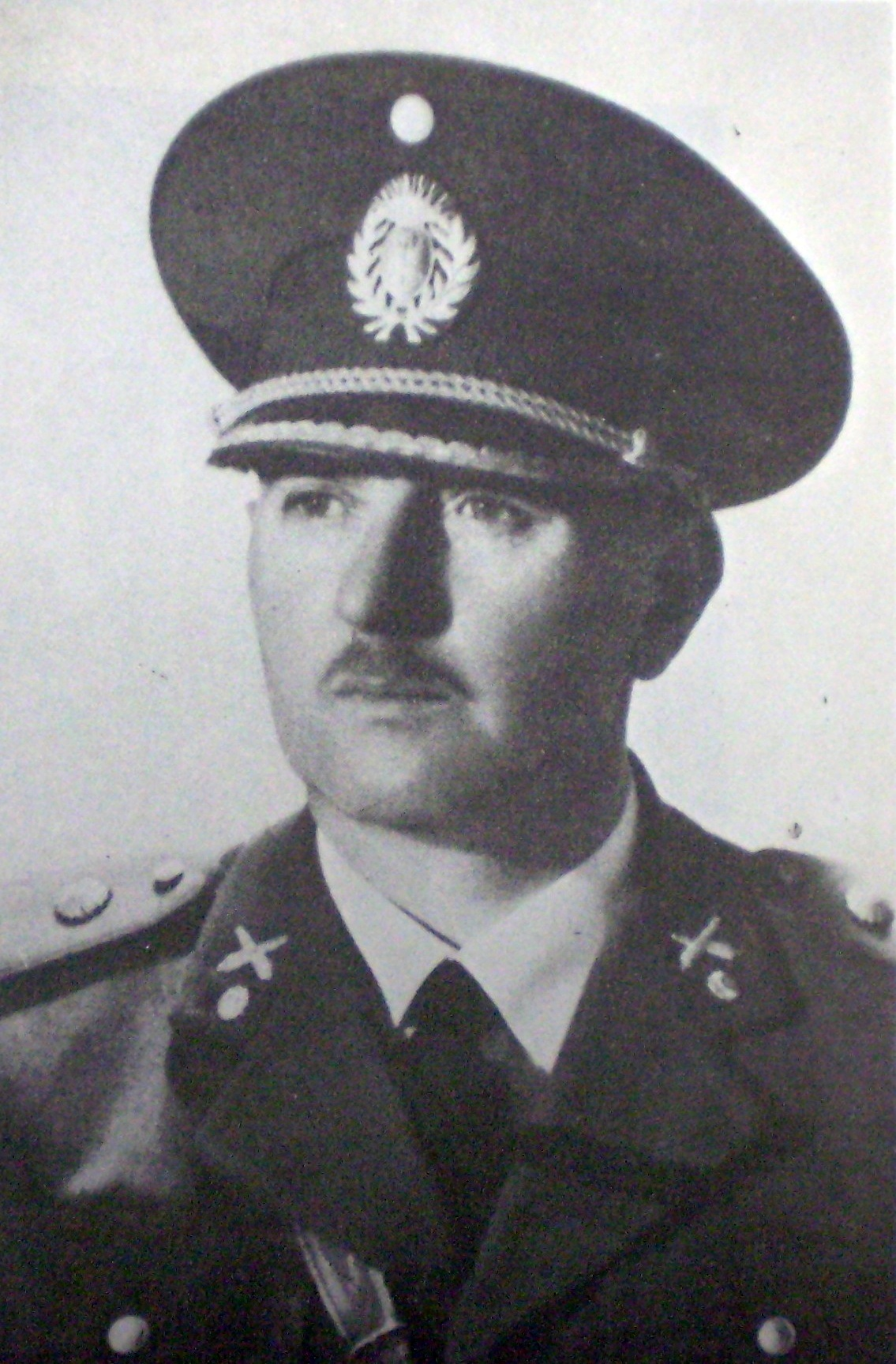

Governor of Buenos Aires
- In office May 16, 1946 – June 4, 1952
- Deputy: Juan Bautista Machado (1946–1950); José Luis Passerini (1950–1952)
- Preceded by: Francisco Sainz Kelly (de facto)
- Succeeded by: Carlos V. Aloe

Personal details
- Born: June 11, 1898
- Died: February 21, 1976 (aged 77)
- Political party: Justicialist Party
- Spouse: Elena Caporale

Domingo Mercante (June 11, 1898 – February 21, 1976) was an Argentine military officer and governor of the province of Buenos Aires. He stood out as one of the initiators of Peronism, organizing labor mobilizations that ended on 17 October 1945 with the release of Juan Domingo Perón.

== Life and times ==
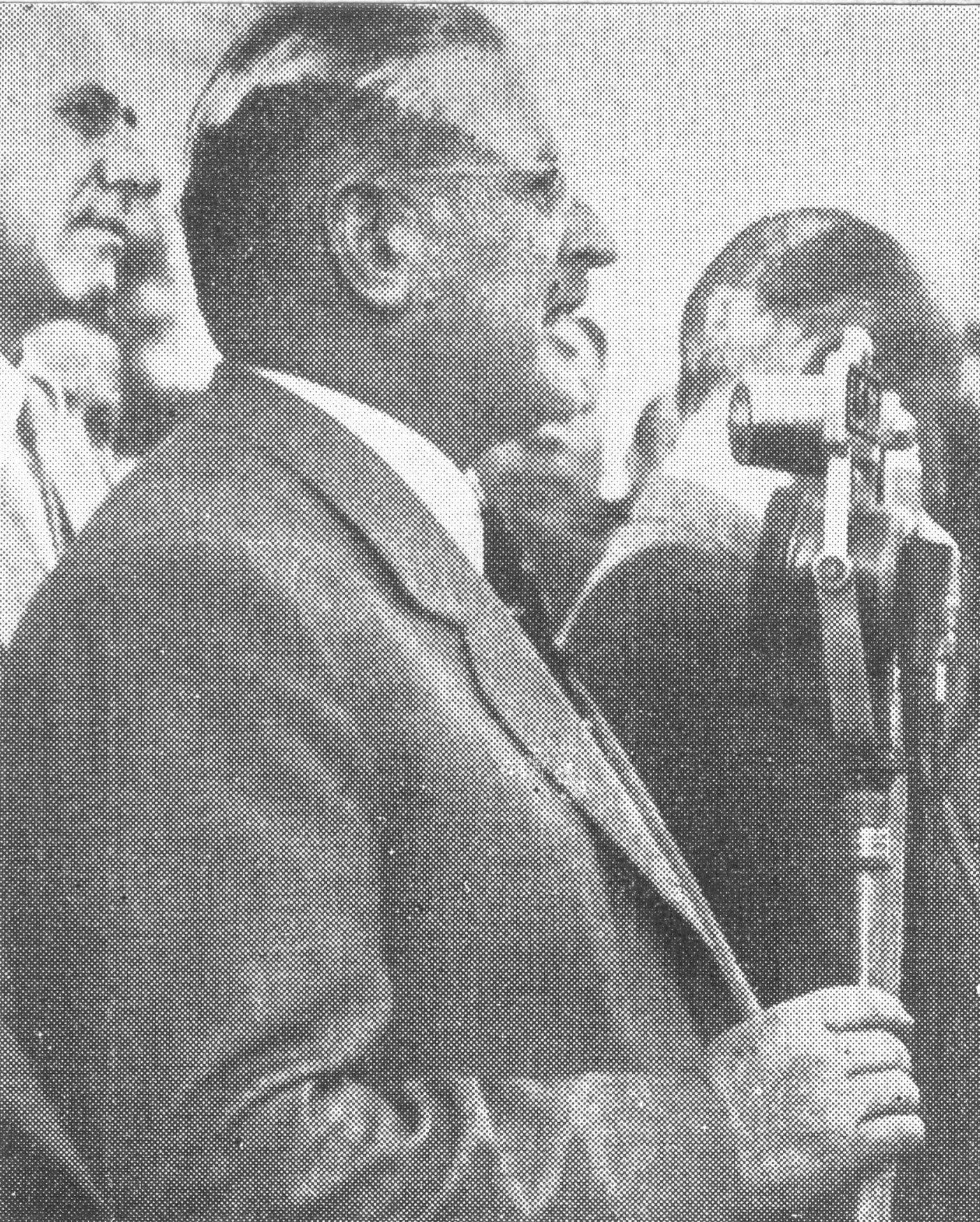
Mercante giving a speech in Capilla del Señor in 1950.

Domingo Alfredo Mercante was born in the Flores section of Buenos Aires in 1898. His father was a locomotive engineer and senior member of La Fraternidad, the main railway workers' trade union at the time. He completed his secondary education in the National Military College in 1919 and received further training in the Superior War College, making him a career military officer. He married Elena Caporale and was transferred to the chief Argentine Army base, the Campo de Mayo, where he remained from 1924 to 1940. A lieutenant colonel in the Mountain Division, Mercante took part in the 1943 coup d'état against conservative President Ramón Castillo. This opportunity led labor leaders Ángel Borlenghi and Juan Atilio Bramuglia to seek allies in the new regime, which they first found in Mercante - familiar to the rail workers' unions through his father. Mercante became the liaison between labor and the amenable new Labor Minister, a colleague from the Mountain Division, Col. Juan Perón.

This role led to his appointment as comptroller of La Fraternidad and of its rival, the Unión Ferroviaria; as such, he proved central to Perón's achieving political dominance of the regime after October 17, 1945. Imprisoned days earlier by junta leaders wary of his popularity, Perón's fateful release was due greatly to Mercante, who was his chief negotiator and who helped Eva Duarte plan and lead successful mobilizations for his release (Mercante introduced "Evita" to the populist leader in 1944). Promoted to full colonel in December, Mercante was named to the powerful Labor Ministry and accepted Perón's offer of the nomination as his running mate; in January, however, Mercante asked to be dropped from the ticket - asking instead to stand for governor of the paramount Province of Buenos Aires.

Running on Perón's Labor Party ticket, Mercante defeated centrist UCR nominee Alejandro Leloir by almost 20%. He ran well ahead of Labor Party candidates for the provincial legislature (who ended just short of the UCR) and even ahead of Perón, himself. Governor Mercante pursued a vigorous social agenda, becoming a key contributor to the Peronist program of enhanced labor rights and public works investments. Over the next six years, his administration accelerated land reform (distributing 1300 square kilometres(1,400,000 acres) - of unused land), completed 1600 schools and 146 housing developments, among numerous other such works (built in a mock-chalet style, these housing units became known as the "Mercante chalets").

These accomplishments and their lengthy acquaintance helped make Mercante one of Perón's most important allies; as such, he was named President of the Constitutional Assembly of 1948 - a body entrusted to replace the 1853 Argentine Constitution. Reelected governor in 1950 by over 25% over UCR nominee Ricardo Balbín, Mercante became increasingly thought of as a potential successor to the president, whose second term would, in theory, end in 1958. This prominence became a liability to the popular governor, however, Perón prevailed on him to stand down for new gubernatorial elections in 1952, expelling him from the Peronist Party in 1953.

Mercante did not allow this imposition to be a cause of conflict between himself and the president, declaring that "I've always towed our leader's line and, moreover, consider it anathema not to do so. My government in Buenos Aires Province depended on Perón, and disloyalty to him would have been tantamount to disloyalty to our movement and beliefs." The retired officer joined efforts to quell a 1955 coup attempt against Perón; the coup was successful, however, and the ensuing regime tried Mercante. Soon freed, he maintained a low profile afterwards and died in 1976 at age 77.

Preceded by Francisco Sainz Kelly	Governor of Buenos Aires; 1946 – 1952	Succeeded by Carlos Vicente Aloé

== Bibliography ==
- Becker, Carolyn A. (2005). Domingo A. Mercante: A Democrat in the Shadow of Perón And Evita. Replica Books. ISBN 1-4134-9532-X.
- Panella, Claudio (comp.) (2005). El gobierno de Domingo Mercante en Buenos Aires (1946-1952). Un caso de peronismo provincial. Archivo Histórico de la Provincia de Buenos Aires Dr. Ricardo Levene: La Plata.
