= Hotel Jousten =

Historic hotel in Buenos Aires, Argentina

Coordinates: 34.6032°S 58.3709°W

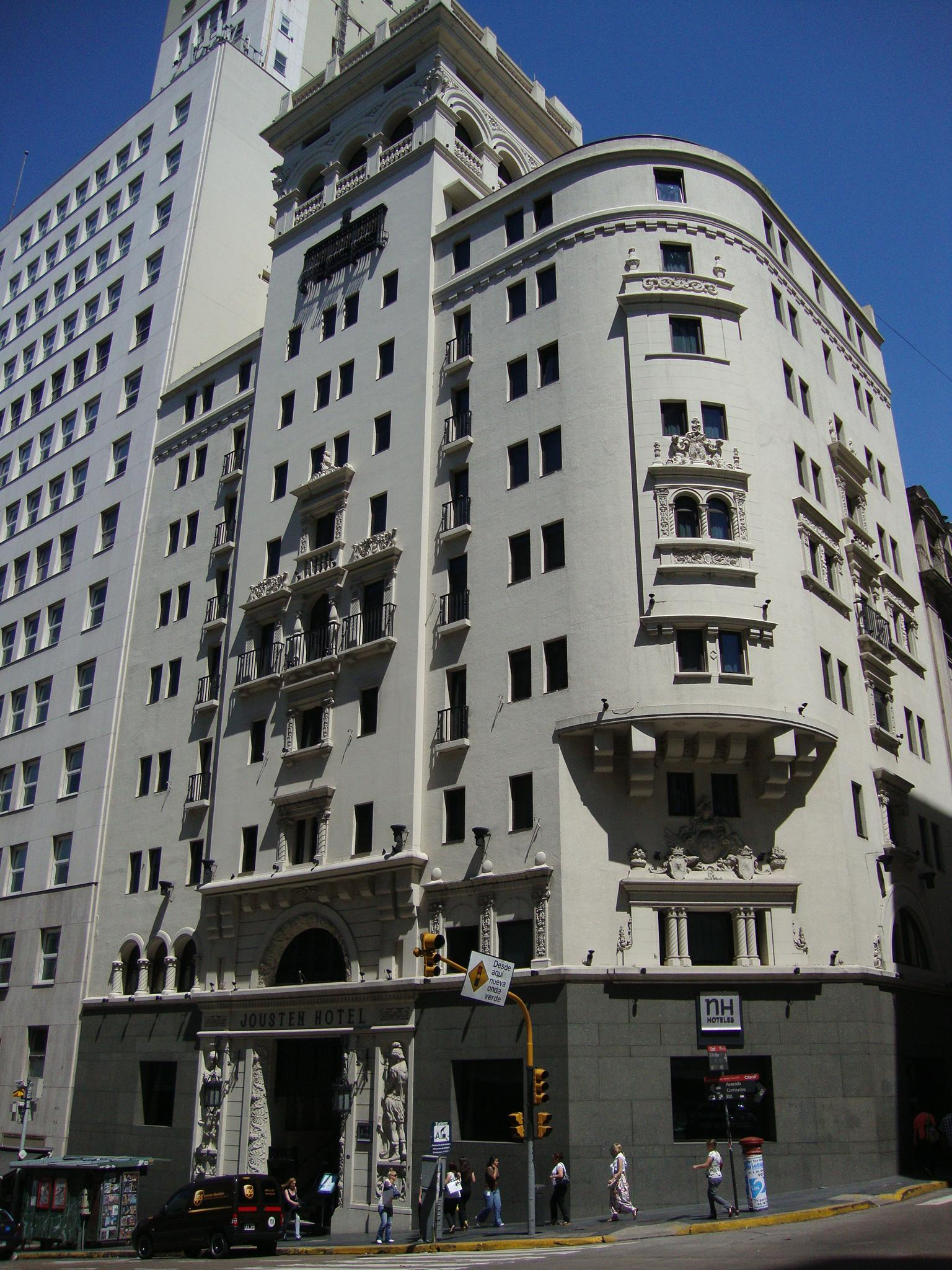
- Interactive map of the Hotel Jousten area
- Hotel chain: NH Hotels

General information
- Type: Hotel
- Architectural style: Neo-Plateresque
- Location: San Nicolás, Buenos Aires, Argentina, Avenida Corrientes 280
- Opened: 1928
- Renovated: 1998–2000
- Closed: 30 March 1980
- Owner: NH Hotels

Technical details
- Floor count: 11
- Floor area: 4,701 m2

Design and construction
- Architects: Luciano Chersanaz and Raúl Pérez Irigoyen

Other information
- Number of rooms: 85
- Number of suites: 5

Website
- www.nh-hotels.com/hotel/nh-collection-buenos-aires-jousten

The Jousten Hotel (later the NH Jousten Hotel) is a four-star hotel at the corner of Avenida Corrientes and 25 de Mayo Street in Buenos Aires, Argentina. It was the setting for several historical events, including conspiratorial meetings of the so-called "Jousten generals" before the 1943 Argentine Revolution. The hotel closed in 1980 and was reopened in 2000 by NH Hotels.

== History ==
In 1925, María Lidia Lloveras, Princess of Faucigny-Lucinge, asked her brother-in-law, the architect and engineer Raúl Pérez Irigoyen, to draw up plans for what became the Jousten Hotel. Construction began in 1926.

Two years later, President Marcelo Torcuato de Alvear presided over the hotel's inauguration. A high-end establishment, it hosted travellers arriving from the nearby port in the decades that followed. Like many hotels of its time, the Jousten was intended for long stays, and its rooms were equipped much like small apartments, in keeping with contemporary practice.

In the following decades, changes in the hotel industry and the decline of downtown Buenos Aires led to the hotel's closure on 30 March 1980. In the months that followed, the original furniture, interior decoration, and tableware were auctioned off, and the building stood abandoned for years.

In late 1998, the Spanish chain NH Hotels bought the deteriorated Jousten as part of the hotel network it was beginning to build in Argentina. Restoration and remodelling work was carried out during 1999, and the new NH Jousten Hotel reopened in May 2000. That year, the Sociedad Central de Arquitectos and the Consejo Profesional de Arquitectura y Urbanismo awarded the project their annual prize for Best Recycled Building.

In November 2003, Buenos Aires Museo granted the hotel the distinction Testimonio Vivo de la Memoria Ciudadana ("Living Testimony of the City's Memory"), on the grounds that it had preserved its original character and decoration during the refurbishment process.

== Architecture ==
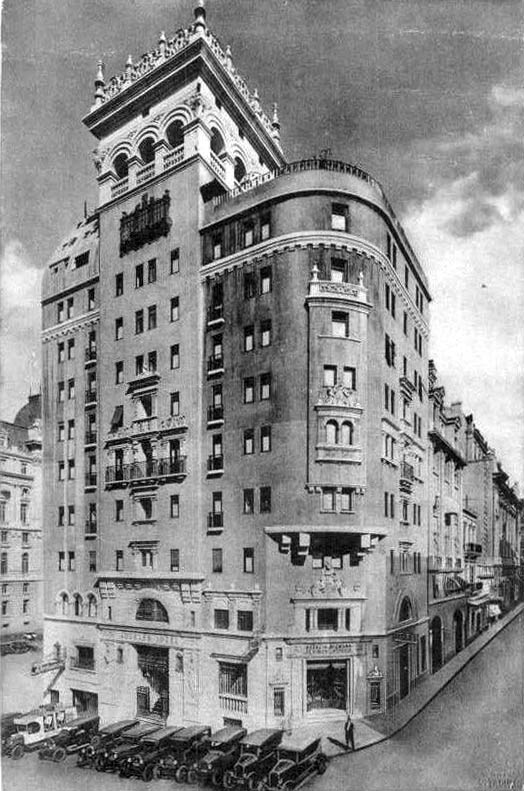
The original painted façade, in a postcard from the 1930s

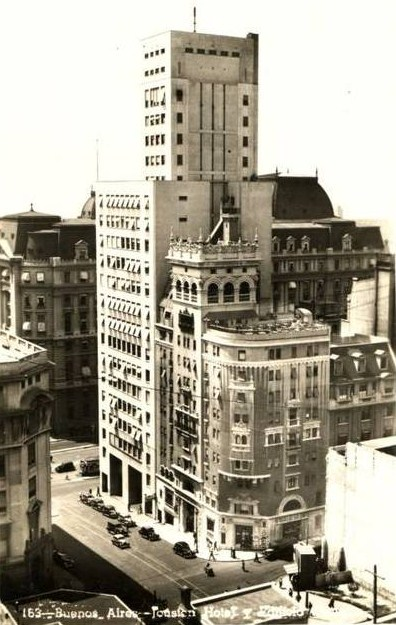
The Jousten with the Comega Building already completed, c. 1934

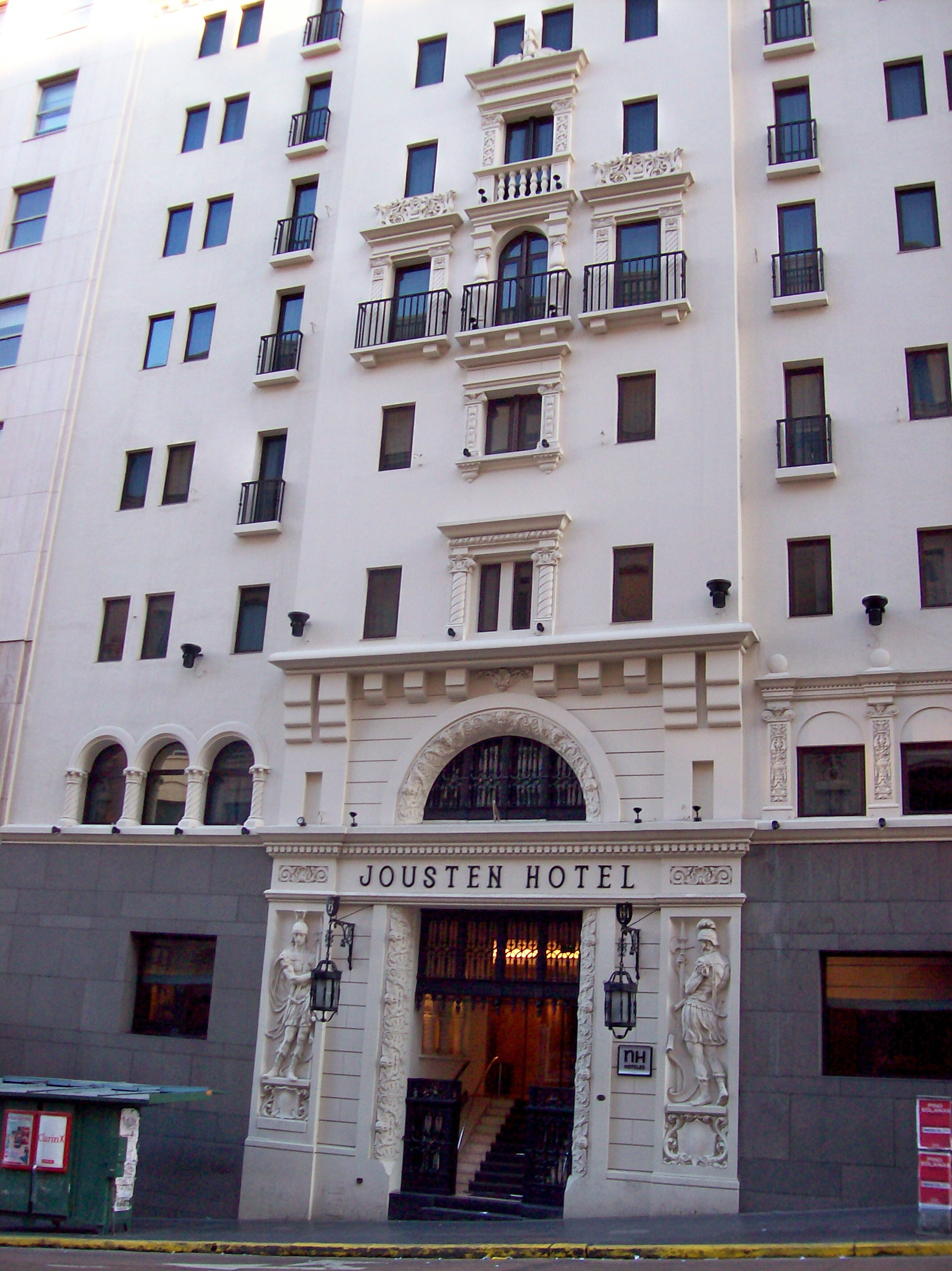
The façade with Neo-Plateresque details and the new granite-clad base

=== Original design ===
The Jousten Hotel was designed by the architects Luciano Chersanaz and Raúl Pérez Irigoyen in the Neo-Plateresque style, a revival of the Spanish Plateresque tradition also seen in Buenos Aires in buildings such as the Teatro Nacional Cervantes and the Bank of Boston building.

Built by the firm of engineer Mauricio Kimbaun, the hotel occupies a site on a marked slope, so that the semi-basement level—where the restaurant El Faisán was installed—opens to street level on the eastern side. Below it, in the basement, were the wine cellar, the laundry area and the boiler room.

The ground floor, whose façade features a large entrance arch guarded by two armoured soldiers in relief, gives access to the hotel lobby by means of a staircase. To the right was a ladies' sitting room and to the left a reading room, while a corridor at the rear led to the basement restaurant and a staircase next to two lifts serving the upper floors. On the chamfered corner, a commercial premises was leased by the owner.

On the first floor were the breakfast room and kitchen, as well as the large function room facing 25 de Mayo Street. On the second floor the corner was laid out with a 45-degree chamfer, but from the third to the eighth floors the corner became curved and the floors were designed with an identical layout. Each floor originally contained sixteen rooms and two bathrooms arranged symmetrically on the axis of the hotel entrance. A C-shaped plan allowed all rooms to receive natural light, even when they did not face the external façade.

On the ninth floor, another bar and restaurant with an open-air terrace occupied the roof and had a large kitchen on a mezzanine. From that level rose the tower crowning the building, beside which was the machine room for the three dumbwaiters serving the staff sector.

=== Restoration and alterations ===
The restoration carried out for NH Hotels in 1998 was designed by the architectural practices Urgell-Fazio-Penedo-Urgell, Fernández-Otero and Caparra-Entelman y Asociados, and built by RT Construcciones.

On the exterior, the artificial-stone render of the façade was painted over, while the base was heavily altered in the design of its openings and clad in grey granite; originally it had displayed a rusticated render. The building thus lost the decorative iron grilles it originally had, while the shop that had opened onto the corner at 25 de Mayo had its doorway closed and replaced with a window. The interior of the ground floor was also altered, with the space originally intended for the leased commercial unit converted into sitting areas. Access to the basement restaurant was modified as well, and emergency staircases were added, as required by law at the time of the refurbishment.

The hotel floors were completely redesigned, reducing the number of rooms on each floor but providing all of them with private bathrooms, an essential feature for a four-star hotel. Eighty rooms occupy the second through eighth floors, while the ninth floor and the tower were turned into the hotel's five suites.

Finally, elements such as the ornamented basement columns, the coffered ceiling and the original ceramic finishes on the ground floor were retained and restored. In the newly built areas, fine materials such as marble and wood were used, combined with artificial-stone render.
