= Victoria Torni =

First Lady of Argentina between 1944 and 1946

Victoria Torni de Farrell
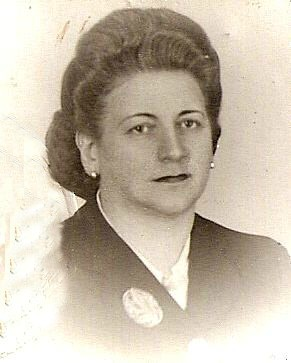
- Torni in 1945

First Lady of Argentina
- In role 25 February 1944 – 3 June 1946
- President: Edelmiro Julián Farrell
- Preceded by: María Inés Lobato Mulle
- Succeeded by: Eva Duarte

Personal details
- Born: Conrada Victoria Torni Carpani; 1 January 1893 Rosario, Santa Fe Province, Argentina
- Died: 16 August 1977 (aged 84) Luján de Cuyo, Mendoza Province, Argentina
- Spouse: Edelmiro Julián Farrell (m. 1919; sep. 1944)
- Children: 3
- Occupation: schoolteacher; socialite

Conrada Victoria Torni Carpani de Farrell (1 January 1893 – 16 August 1977), commonly known as Victoria Torni, was an Argentine schoolteacher and socialite who served as the First Lady of Argentina between 1944 and 1946 as the wife of de facto President Edelmiro Farrell.

== Biography ==
Torni was born in 1893 in Rosario, Santa Fe, Argentina, the daughter of Italian immigrant Atilio Nicodemo Torni and French immigrant María Magdalena Carpani. In Rosario, Torni studied teaching at a national public school and became fluent in the French language. She also worked as a piano teacher and has been described as a voracious reader. In 1913, the family moved away from Rosario and settled in Zárate, Buenos Aires.

An affluent family, the Tornis opened a shoe store and owned one of the first cars that drove through the streets of Zárate. In her adult life, Torni continued a friendship with author Alfonsina Storni (whom she had met at secondary school) and other socialites in the area. Torni and Storni founded a fellowship to promote literature and music for "women with free thoughts."

In 1914, Torni met Edelmiro Farrell, a member of the Argentine Army who shared her interests in literature and music. They got engaged that same year and maintained a long-distance relationship for five years, as Farrell moved frequently due to military assignments in different parts of the country. Torni and Farrell exchanged letters and parcels during those years. Torni's parents, aware of the womanizer label attributed to Farrell in Zárate, put strict conditions on their relationship, including parental oversight when Farrell visited Torni's home.

Torni and Farrell married on 10 July 1919 at a Catholic church in Zárate. During the celebrations at Torni's home, Alfonsina Storni recited poems that she had written for Torni and Farrell. Storni also gifted the couple with a set of plates of French porcelain. Farrell and Torni had three children: Nelly Victoria, Jorge Edelmiro, and Susana Mabel. In 1943, Farrell took part in that year's coup d'état and subsequently became minister of war, developing a temporary close relationship with Juan Domingo Perón, which would fall apart by 1945.

The marriage between Torni and Farrell began to fail by the end of the 1930s and early 1940s, with Torni's only role as the First Lady of Argentina being Farrell's oath-taking in February 1944. Alleging "non-political" motives for the separation, Torni left Buenos Aires shortly afterward and moved to an estate in rural Mendoza Province that she had purchased in the 1930s. As a result of the separation, their eldest daughter, Nelly, assumed the unofficial role of First Lady, accompanying Farrell in protocolary ceremonies, including meeting with new ambassadors and other diplomats.

After disappearing from public life, Torni was a largely obscure figure and little is known about her life after leaving Buenos Aires. In August 1965, the magazine Primera Plana published a note giving updates on the lives of six then-living first ladies of Argentina. Among those was Torni, whose daughter Nelly spoke with the magazine. Nelly described her mother's health and daily life, saying that she was in a wheelchair and suffering from severe arthritis, but added that Torni remained strong. Nelly stated further that her mother did not "live off memories", except for remembering her intimate friend Alfonsina Storni, who committed suicide in 1938 when she jumped to sea in Mar del Plata.

Torni died in Luján de Cuyo, Mendoza Province, on 16 August 1977, at the age of 84. After her death, the family brought her remains to Buenos Aires and buried her in the Torni family's vault in La Chacarita Cemetery.
