= Pedro Pablo Ramírez =

22nd President of Argentina

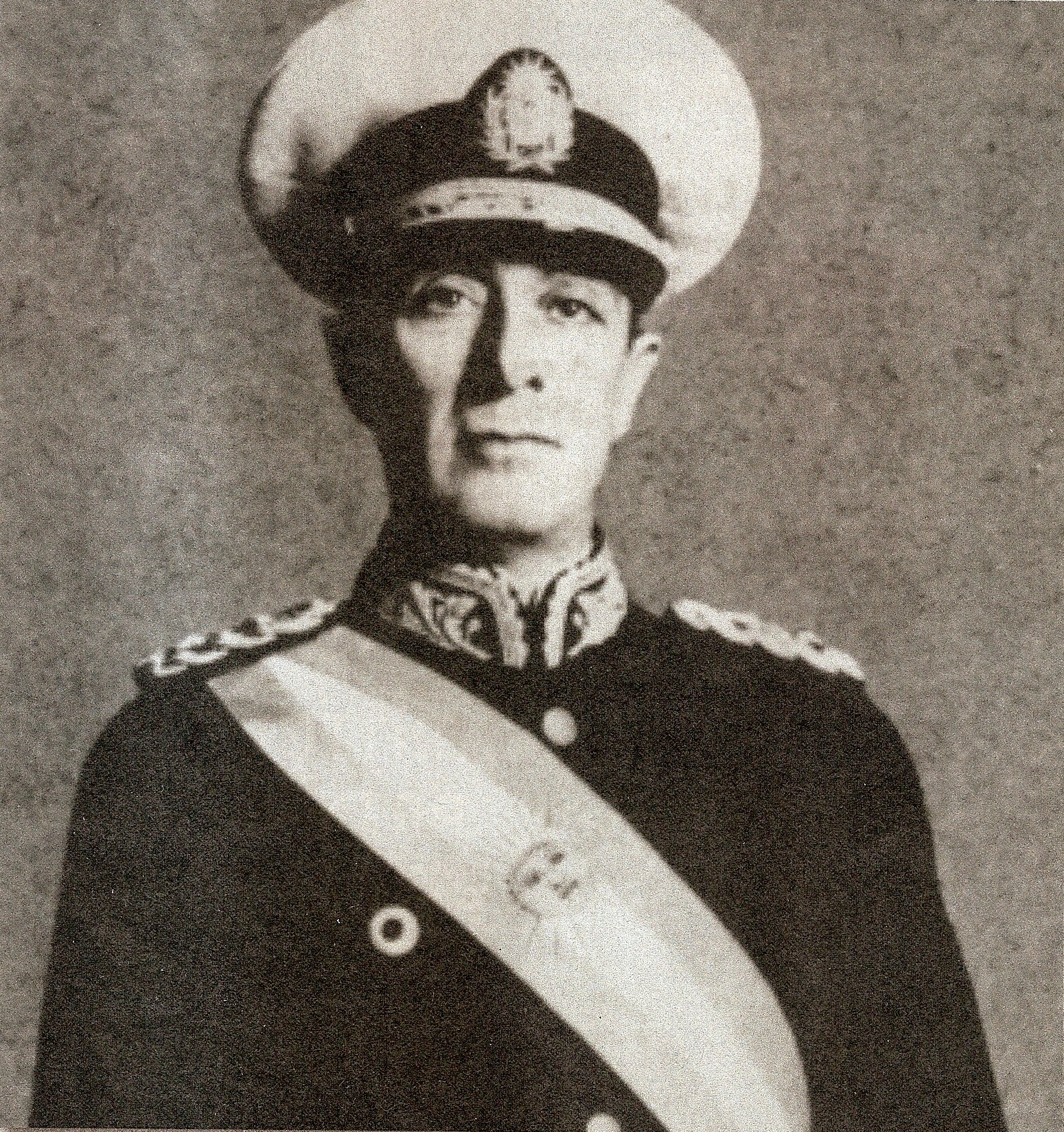

27th President of Argentina
- De facto
- In office 7 June 1943 – 9 March 1944
- Appointed by: Military junta
- Vice President: Sabá Sueyro (Jun–Oct 1943); Edelmiro Julián Farrell (1943–1944)
- Preceded by: Arturo Rawson (de facto)
- Succeeded by: Edelmiro Julián Farrell (de facto)

Personal details
- Born: 30 January 1884 La Paz, Entre Ríos
- Died: 12 May 1962 (aged 78) Buenos Aires
- Party: United Officers' Group
- Spouse: María Inés Lobato Mulle
- Profession: Military
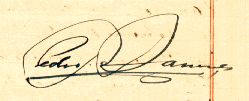
- Signature

Military service
- Branch/service: Argentine Army
- Years of service: 1904–1944
- Rank: Major General

Pedro Pablo Ramírez Menchaca (30 January 1884 – 12 May 1962) was President of Argentina from 7 June 1943, to 9 March 1944. He was the founder and leader of Guardia Nacional, Argentina's fascist militia.

== Life and career ==
After graduating from the Argentine military college in 1904 as a second lieutenant, Ramírez was promoted in 1910 as first lieutenant of the cavalry. In 1911, he was sent to Germany for training with the Fifth Hussars cavalry in Kaiser Wilhelm II's Prussian Army. He returned home in 1913, with a German wife, prior to the outbreak of World War I. Advancing in rank as a specialist in cavalry tactics, he assisted fellow General José Félix Uriburu in an authoritarian coup that deposed Hipólito Yrigoyen in 1930. Ramírez was sent to Rome to observe Mussolini's army until his return in 1932.

When Uriburu set free elections and then died, General Ramírez worked behind the scenes to plan a return of fascism to Argentina. Over the next several years, he organized the Milicia Nacionalista (later the Guardia), and authored a program for a state ruled by the militia. In 1942, Ramírez was appointed War Minister by President Ramón Castillo, and began to reorganize the Argentine Army. At the same time, the Guardia Nacional joined with another party to form "Recuperacion Nacional," a fascist political party. Castillo fired Ramírez following a cabinet meeting on 18 May 1943. Two weeks later, on 4 June 1943, Ramírez assisted Arturo Rawson in overthrowing Castillo's government, and was again made Minister of War. Three days later, on 7 June Ramírez forced Rawson's resignation and maintained Argentina's neutrality during World War II. Because of this, the United States refused Argentine requests for Lend-Lease aid. Argentina finally declared war on Germany and Japan during the government of Edelmiro Farrell.

== In popular culture ==
- Ramírez makes a brief appearance in the film Evita during the song "The Lady's Got Potential", which depicts Juan Perón's rise to power. Here he is depicted as a very elderly man, played by Héctor Malamud.

Political offices
Preceded by Arturo Rawson	President of Argentina; 1943–1944	Succeeded by Edelmiro Farrell
