= Sabá Sueyro =

Sabá Hector Sueyro
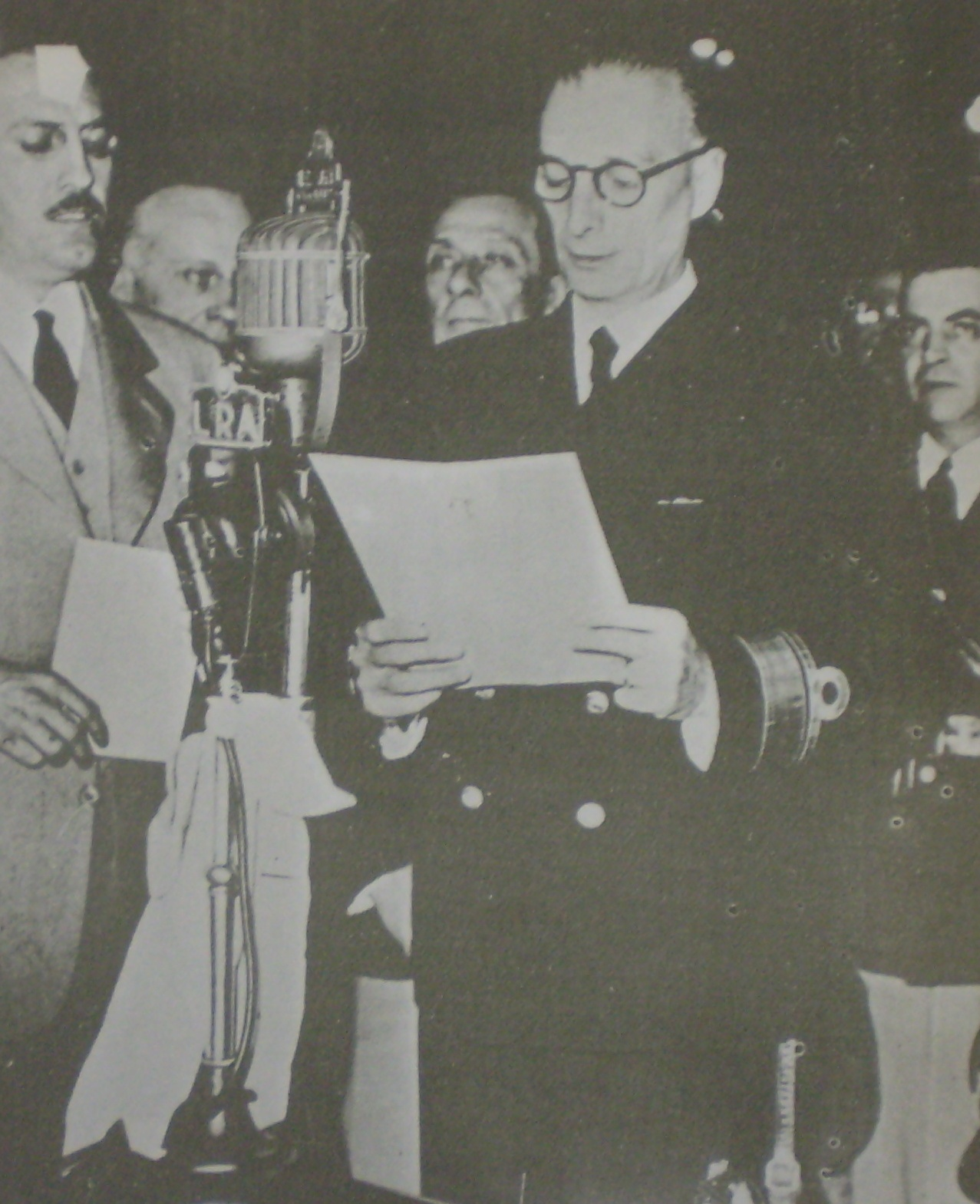

18th Vice President of Argentina
- In office June 7, 1943 – October 15, 1943
- President: Pedro Pablo Ramírez
- Preceded by: Ramón Castillo
- Succeeded by: Edelmiro Farrell

Personal details
- Born: 1889 Buenos Aires
- Died: October 15, 1943 (aged 54) Buenos Aires
- Profession: Navy officer

Sabá Héctor Sueyro (1889 – October 15, 1943) served as Vice President of Argentina. Sueyro was in office from the coup of June 7, 1943, until his death on October 15 of the same year.

On his death, although "the public hardly knew him" the Argentine government directed the country "to regard his death as a national calamity ... all broadcasters were ordered to carry appropriate funeral programs".

Sueyro's brother, Rear Admiral Benito Sueyro, was Argentina's Minister of the Navy (1940–43).

Political offices
Preceded by Ramón Castillo	Vice President of Argentina; 1943	Succeeded by Edelmiro Farrell
