= Arturo Rawson =

21st President of Argentina

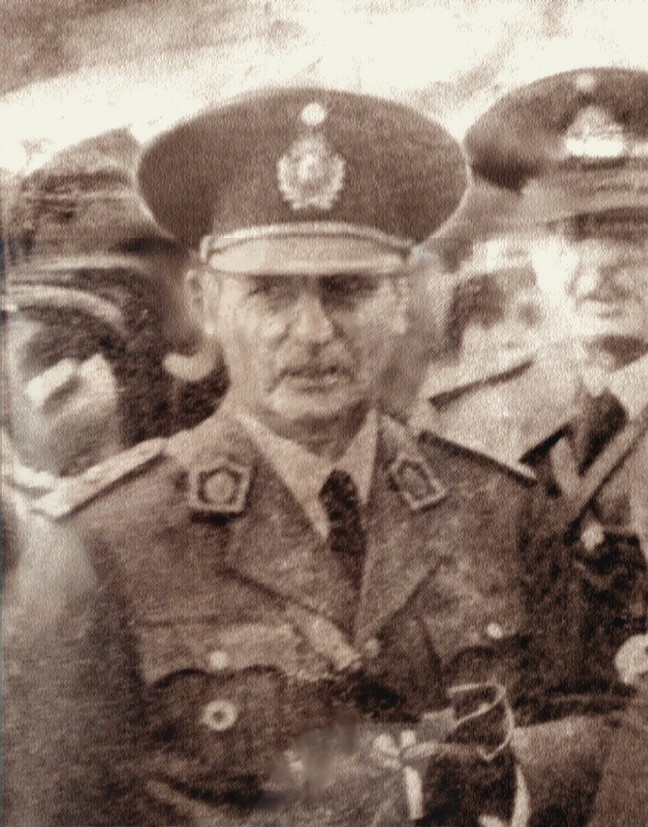

26th President of Argentina
- De facto
- In office June 4, 1943 – June 7, 1943
- Appointed by: Military junta
- Vice President: None
- Preceded by: Ramón Castillo
- Succeeded by: Pedro Pablo Ramírez (de facto)

Personal details
- Born: June 4, 1885 Santiago del Estero
- Died: October 8, 1952 (aged 67) Buenos Aires
- Party: Independent
- Spouse: Delia Sixta Borda (1895–1983)
- Profession: Military

Arturo Rawson (June 4, 1885 – October 8, 1952) was the provisional President of Argentina from June 4, 1943, to June 7, 1943.

His coup started a series which culminated in the accession to power of the Labor Party just 3 years later.

== Biography ==
Rawson was born in Santiago del Estero in 1885 to a San Juan family of American origin. Through his grandfather Juan de Dios Rawson, he was related to Guillermo Rawson. Rawson attended Argentina’s Military College, which he graduated from in 1905 and subsequently taught at for a time. Rawson rose through the ranks of the Argentine Army and was eventually promoted to general. By 1943, Rawson was the Commanding Officer of Cavalry at Campo de Mayo. On June 3, 1943, Rawson was contacted by members of the GOU (United Officers' Group), a group of military officers planning to overthrow Argentina's civilian government. The GOU, lacking the sufficient number of troops needed to successfully implement a coup, knew Rawson could provide the soldiers they required. Rawson, who had been scheming to overthrow the government even before he was contacted by the GOU, agreed to their plan. On June 4, Rawson and 10,000 troops under his command entered Buenos Aires and overthrew the government of Ramón Castillo. This ended the historical period known as the Infamous Decade and started the Revolution of '43.

Rawson promptly declared himself president of Argentina the same day, beating Pedro Pablo Ramírez to do so. However, his choices for his cabinet alienated the GOU leadership, who forced him to resign on June 7. Rawson, as Castillo did, supported the Allies of World War II, but the bulk of the military that organized the coup wanted Argentina to stay neutral in the conflict, considering that joining the war would prove destructive for the country. Colonel Elbio Anaya appeared at his office and told him that he was ruling because of a misunderstanding, as the president was Ramírez. Rawson resigned, and rejected the military escort, leaving the Casa Rosada on a military jeep. His time as president was so brief that he never actually made the Oath of office. Even so, he did not take power as an interim president, but expecting to rule for a long time. Thus, Rawson has had the second shortest mandate of any Argentine president, and the shortest mandate of any Argentine non-acting president, holding the office for just three days (the first being Federico Pinedo with 12 hours).

After resigning as president, Rawson was appointed Ambassador to Brazil, a post he would hold until 1944. He congratulated Ramírez when he broke relations with Germany and Japan. In 1945, Rawson was arrested and brought before a military tribunal for opposing the government of President Edelmiro Farrell, but he was quickly released. In September 1951, Rawson supported General José Benjamín Menéndez’s failed attempt to overthrow the government of Juan Perón, for which Rawson was temporarily imprisoned. He wrote the book Argentina y Bolivia en la epopeya de la emancipación (literally "Argentina and Bolivia in the Liberation epic"). Rawson died of a heart attack in Buenos Aires in 1952. He is buried at La Recoleta Cemetery in Buenos Aires.

== Bibliography ==
- Mendelevich, Pablo (2010). El Final. Buenos Aires: Ediciones B. ISBN 978-987-627-166-0.

Political offices
Preceded by Ramón Castillo	President of Argentina; 1943	Succeeded by Pedro P. Ramírez
