= De facto government doctrine =

Argentine legal doctrine

The de facto government doctrine is an element of Argentine case law related to the validity of the actions of de facto governments. It allowed the government actions taken during those times to stay valid after the de facto government had ended. It was initially ruled by the Supreme Court in 1930, and stayed active as law until the 1994 amendment of the Argentine Constitution.

== Antecedents ==
A similar ruling was enacted in 1865, just a few years after the 1853 Constitution. Bartolomé Mitre declared himself President of Argentina after the victory at the Battle of Pavón, under supervision of the Argentine National Congress. The Supreme Court had to rule whenever his rulings were valid, and did so. It considered that he emerged triumphant from a revolution, that the peoples supported his rule, and that he got the duty of following the National Constitution and restore order. Mitre stayed in government this way for just a few months.

== The doctrine ==
The de facto government doctrine was introduced in 1930, after the coup of José Félix Uriburu against President Hipólito Yrigoyen. Uriburu assumed the powers of government, dissolved Congress and intervened in the provinces. Informed of this, the Supreme Court legitimized the new government, "as long as it executes the administrative and political function derived from its possession of the force as guarantee of order and social security". The court reserved for itself the right to monitor and enforce the new government's pledge to observe and obey the constitution and laws. In cases of necessity and urgency (but excluding penal law), the new government was allowed to issue temporary legislation by decree, but these had to be authorised by the Court and would only remain in force if ratified by Congress.

The Supreme Court made a similar ruling after the Revolution of '43, but greatly expanded the rights of the military government. The Court relinquished its right to authorise decrees to the de facto government and also allowed for decrees to remain in force after a return to constitutional government, without the need for ratification.

In 1955, the Revolución Libertadora ousted President Juan Domingo Perón. The new government dissolved the Congress, replaced the members of the Supreme Court and intervened in the provinces. A constitutional convention repealed Perón's 1949 amendments to the constitution. The Court did not rule on this but accepted the constitution as it was in place in 1898 as the basis of other rulings. The Court did not rule it appropriate for decrees to expire, reasoning that the 1930 coup ousted the executive branch, whereas the 1955 coup aimed at both the executive and legislative branches, and thus decrees should remain in force after the coup.

Arturo Frondizi was ousted from office in 1962, but before the military could take the government the president of the chamber of senators, José María Guido, took the presidency according to legal provisions pertaining to vacancy (Article 75 of the Argentine Constitution and the 1868 Law of Succession-ley de acefalía). The Court judged that he was a legitimate president, and that it shouldn't rule about the actions that led to the leaderless state.
