= Ramón Castillo =

20th President of Argentina (1942–43)

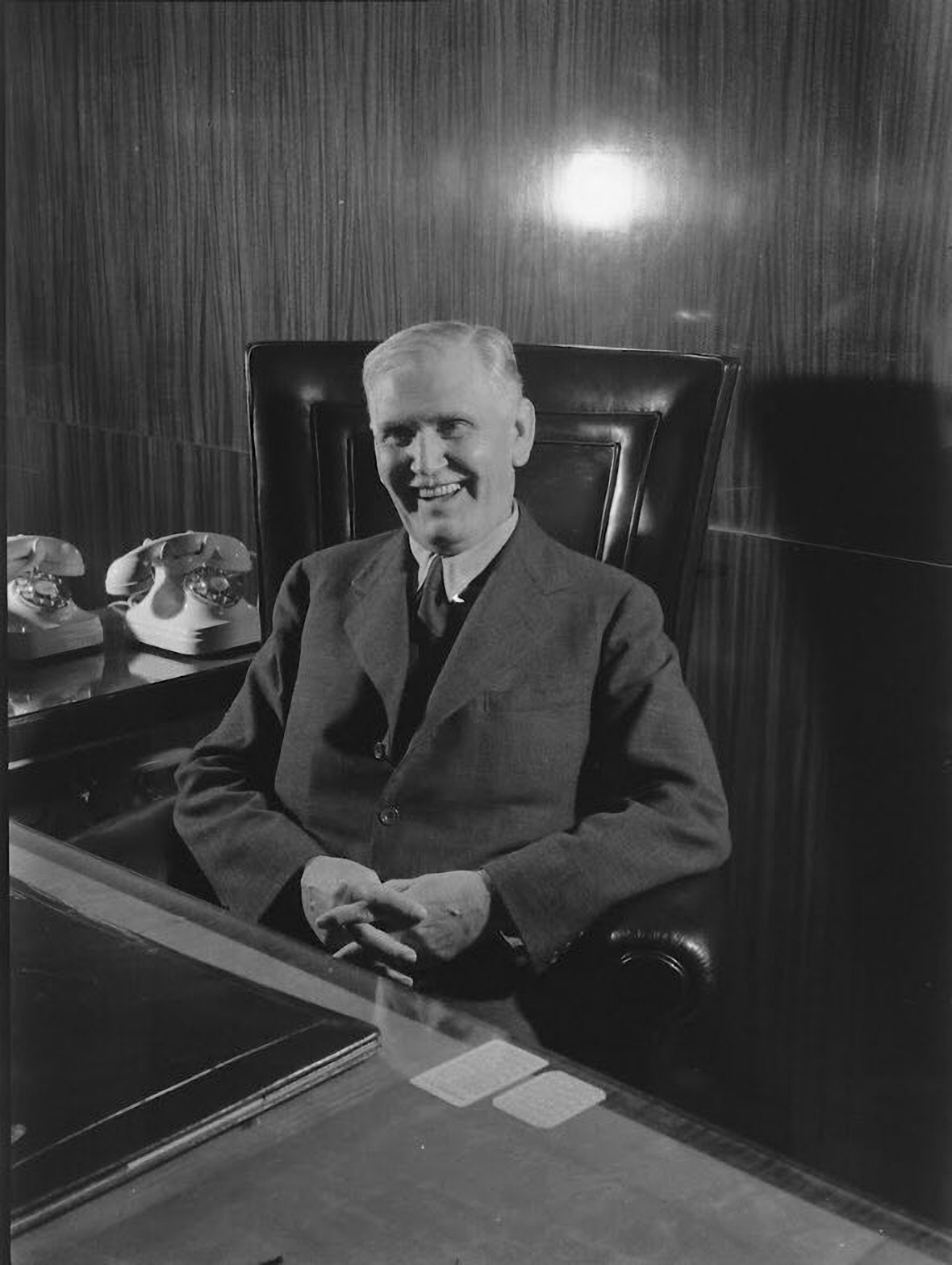
- Castillo c. 1941–1943

25th President of Argentina
- In office Acting: 3 July 1940 – 27 June 1942
- In office 27 June 1942 – 4 June 1943
- Vice President: Vacant
- Preceded by: Roberto María Ortiz
- Succeeded by: Arturo Rawson

17th Vice President of Argentina
- In office 20 February 1938 – 27 June 1942
- President: Roberto María Ortiz
- Preceded by: Julio Argentino Pascual Roca
- Succeeded by: Saba Sueyro (1943)

Personal details
- Born: Ramón Antonio Castillo Barrionuevo; 20 November 1873 Ancasti, Catamarca
- Died: 12 October 1944 (aged 70) Buenos Aires
- Party: PDN (Concordancia)
- Spouse: María Delia Luzuriaga
- Profession: Lawyer

Ramón Antonio Castillo Barrionuevo (20 November 1873 – 12 October 1944) was President of Argentina from 1942 to 1943. He took office after the resignation of President Roberto María Ortiz, under whom he was the Vice President. He was a leading figure in the period known as the Infamous Decade, characterised by electoral fraud, corruption and rule by conservative landowners heading the alliance known as the Concordancia.

Castillo graduated in law from the University of Buenos Aires (UBA) and began a judicial career. He reached the Appeals Chamber of commercial law before retiring and dedicating himself to teaching. He was professor and dean at UBA between 1923 and 1928.

Castillo was named Federal Intervenor of Tucumán Province in 1930. From 1932 until 1935, he was elected to the Argentine Senate for Catamarca Province for the National Democratic Party and was also Minister of Interior.

From 1938 to 1942, Castillo was vice-president of Argentina under President Roberto Ortiz, who won the election by fraud as the head of the Concordancia. He was acting president from 3 July 1940 to 27 June 1942 due to the illness of President Ortiz, who did not resign until less than a month before his death. Castillo maintained Argentina's neutrality during World War II. He was overthrown in the Revolution of '43 military coup in the midst of an unpopular attempt to impose Robustiano Patrón Costas as his successor. Future president Juan Domingo Perón was a junior officer in the coup.

Political offices
Preceded by Julio A. Roca (Jr)	Vice President of Argentina; 1938–1942	Succeeded by Sabá Sueyro
Preceded by Roberto Ortiz	President of Argentina; 1942–1943	Succeeded by Arturo Rawson
