= Alberto Teisaire =

Argentine admiral and politician

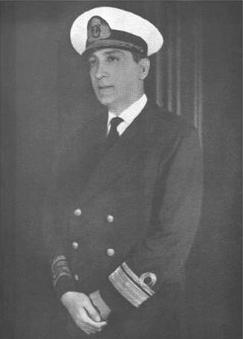

23rd Vice President of Argentina
- In office 7 May 1954 – 16 September 1955
- President: Juan Perón
- Preceded by: Hortensio Quijano
- Succeeded by: Isaac Rojas

Provisional President of the Senate
- In office 1947–1953
- Preceded by: Ernesto Bavio
- Succeeded by: Alberto Iturbe

National Senator
- In office 4 June 1946 – 30 January 1954
- Constituency: City of Buenos Aires

Personal details
- Born: 20 May 1891 Mendoza, Argentina
- Died: 11 September 1963 (aged 72) Buenos Aires
- Party: Independent Party (1945–1947); Peronist Party (1947–1955)
- Spouse: Duilia Fayo Lonne
- Profession: Rear Admiral in the Argentine Navy

Alberto Teisaire (20 May 1891 – 11 September 1963) was an Argentine naval officer and Vice President of Argentina.

== Life and times ==
=== Early life and Navy career ===
Alberto Teisaire was born in 1891 to Clementina Cejas and Eduardo Teisaire, in Mendoza, Argentina. He enrolled in the Argentine Naval Academy in 1908 and, upon graduation in 1912, was accepted to the United States Naval Academy. There, he was commissioned as a submarine officer in the U.S. Navy, during World War I. Returning to Argentina, he married Duilia Fayo Lonne and was eventually named Commander of the Navy's flagship, the historic Sarmiento Frigate.

Teisaire later taught at the Argentine Naval Academy and held numerous policy-making posts in that service, including ones in the Naval Requisitions Department, the Argentine Naval delegations in the United States and Europe, as head of the Navy's River Fleet (1938), and as assistant director of the important Navy Mechanics' School, in 1940, where he specialized in the instruction of navigation and hydrology.

=== Political career ===
A power vacuum, caused by the replacement of President Pedro Ramírez by a fellow General (Edelmiro Farrell), led to Teisaire's 29 February 1944, appointment as Navy Secretary. He became a reliable ally of the new War and Labor Minister, Col. Juan Perón, whose support of organized labor and their platform had provoked growing rivalries within the military regime. Teisaire became Perón's most prominent ally in the government when, in July, he was named Interior Minister (at the time, overseeing law enforcement). He retired as Rear Admiral in 1945 to pursue a seat in the Argentine Senate, ahead of the February 1946 general elections.

Elected as Senator on Perón's Labor Party ticket, Teisaire represented the city of Buenos Aires, a district normally leaning towards Perón's chief opposition, the centrist UCR. He, however, did not enjoy support from the President's influential First Lady, Eva Perón, who refused his request to take part in her 1947 "Rainbow Tour" because (in her words): "I did not want that fruitcake creating a scandal in Paris, when for that I already have Paquito, who at least makes me laugh."

Teisaire did well in his career in the Senate, even so. He was named Provisional President of the Senate in 1947, and was reelected Senator in 1951. He was elected to the Constitutional Assembly of 1949, which drafted a replacement of the 1853 Constitution of Argentina (reinstated in 1957). He was named head of the Peronist Party's Superior Council in 1952, effectively making him the third-most powerful member of the administration (after Interior Minister Ángel Borlenghi and Perón, himself). Teisaire introduced the Lions Club into Argentina in 1954, and received the German Order of Merit.

Controversy surrounding the President's in-laws and political violence both by and against his Peronist movement dominated headlines in the first half of 1953, and Perón took the opportunity of upcoming legislative polls to test his popularity. The Argentine Constitution did not require it at the time, but a special election was announced to replace the late Vice President, Hortensio Quijano, and Perón nominated Teisaire as his candidate for the post.

The April 1954 elections increased the Peronists' overwhelming majority in Congress and elected Teisaire Vice President by a 30% margin of victory. Following this success, Perón began to dispense with his hitherto warm relations with the Catholic Church by banning a number of their organizations and periodicals, and with the unprecedented, 22 December legalization of divorce and prostitution. The Vice President supported these moves, arguing that Argentina's Catholic majority were mostly non-practicing and, by extension, probably amenable to Perón's push to limit their influence.

The miscalculation proved fateful, however. The dispute damaged Teisaire's influence among the largely conservative Catholic navy commanders, who spitefully referred to the Vice President as "that Freemason," and soon destroyed military loyalty for the administration itself. A series of violent confrontations from June to September 1955 ended with Perón's 19 September resignation and exile.

=== Resignation and death ===
Vice President Teisaire was forced to resign on 23 September 1955, following which he was coerced into reading a 7-page confession of the "fugitive dictator's" alleged abuses. His "confession" was produced into a 12-minute propaganda film by the Revolución Libertadora, which ordered the footage shown in all movie theatres. His coerced 1956 statements remained controversial, perceived as a betrayal by many Peronists even after his death.

Teisaire kept a low profile in retirement. Despite some reports that he was assassinated at a restaurant on 12 October 1962 by left-wing Peronist militants while attending a lunch with his assistants, Tesaire actually died of natural causes on 11 September 1963, at age 72.

== Footnotes ==
Political offices
Preceded by Ernesto Bavio	Provisional President of the Senate; 1947–1953	Succeeded by Alberto Iturbe
Preceded by Hortensio Quijano	Vice President of Argentina; 1954–1955	Succeeded by Isaac Rojas
