= 1954 Argentine general election =

- 25 April 1954
- Vice presidential election
- Registered: 9,222,075
- Turnout: 85.58%
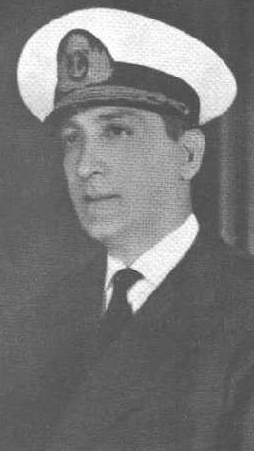

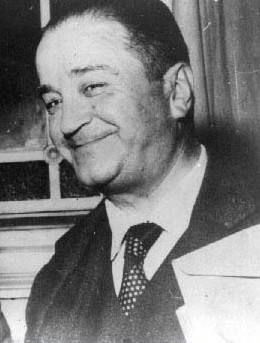
Nominee	Alberto Teisaire	Crisólogo Larralde
Party	Peronist Party	Radical Civic Union
Popular vote	4,944,106	2,493,422
Percentage	64.52%	32.22%
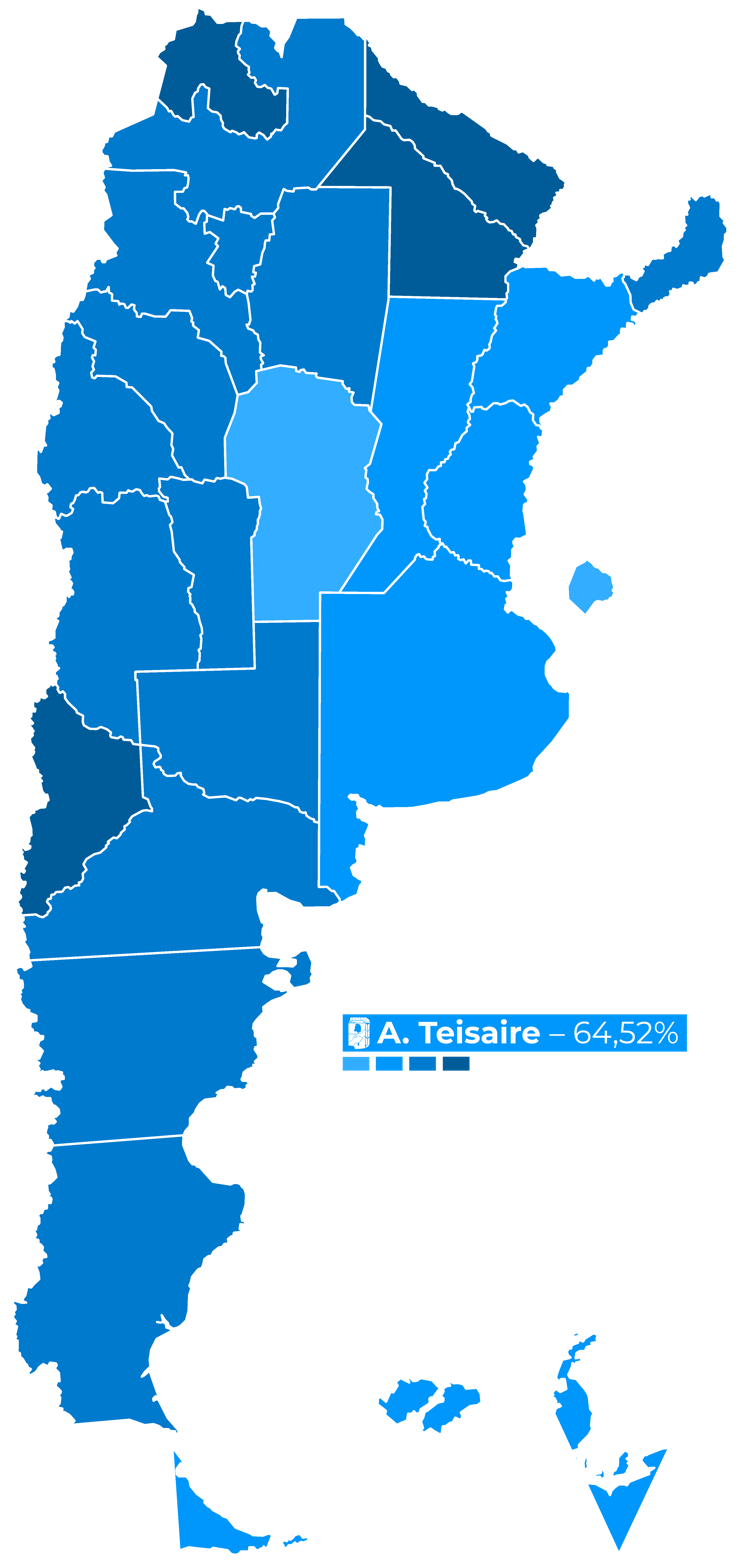
- Results by province
Vice President before election
Vacant
(Hortensio Quijano deceased in 1952)
Vice President-elect
Alberto Teisaire
Peronist Party
- Chamber of Deputies election
- 88 of the 169 seats in the Chamber of Deputies
- Turnout: 86.00%
Party	Vote %	Seats	+/–
Peronist Party	64.28	74	+4
Radical Civic Union	32.31	5	−2
This lists parties that won seats. See the complete results below.
- Senate election
- 18 of the 34 seats in the Senate
Party	Seats	+/–
Peronist Party	18	+3
This lists parties that won seats. See the complete results below.

General elections were held in Argentina on 25 April 1954. Voters chose both their legislators and the Vice-president of Argentina with a turnout of 85%.

== Background ==
The death of his wife and closest advisor, Evita, stuck President Juan Perón amid serious difficulties. A severe drought in 1952 and years of pessimism in Argentina's important agrarian sector depleted foreign reserves and forced Perón to curtail public lending and spending programs. The recession (and a bumper crop) did, however, allow Central Bank reserves to recover and brought inflation (50% in 1951) to single digits.

Controversy surrounding Perón's in-laws and political violence both by and against his Peronist movement had dogged the president in the first half of 1953, and he took the opportunity of upcoming legislative polls to test his popularity. The Argentine Constitution did not require it at the time, but the President announced a special election to replace the late Vice President, Hortensio Quijano. Dr. Quijano had died on April 3, 1952, two months and one day before his term was to have ended on June 4, 1952. Perón nominated Senator Alberto Teisaire as the candidate for the then named Partido Peronista (Peronist Party).

Teisaire was familiar to Perón from the 1943 coup d'état; the former rear admiral had helped retain the normally restive Navy's support for the populist leader before and after Perón's 1946 election and, after eight years in the Senate, he remained close to the military - a far from trivial consideration.

In the opposition since 15 years before Perón took office, the centrist UCR had been burdened by censorship and sundry forms of harassment since 1930, and 1953 had been marked by the jailing of most of their leaders. Among the few prominent figures in the party available to run for the vice-presidency was Crisólogo Larralde. Larralde had opposed the UCR's 1945 alliance with conservatives and socialists against Perón, and was a well-known figure in the UCR's dissident, pro-Perón "Renewal Group." This did not, however, ease the UCR's restriction to access to most mass media, and the party was defeated by similar numbers to their 1951 loss.

== Results ==
=== Vice president ===
Candidate	Party	Votes	%
Alberto Teisaire	Peronist Party	4,994,106	64.52
Crisólogo Larralde	Radical Civic Union	2,493,422	32.22
Benito de Miguel	National Democratic Party	105,550	1.36
Alcira de la Peña	Communist Party of Argentina	89,624	1.16
Luciano Molinas	Democratic Progressive Party	54,054	0.70
José Fernando Penelón	Labour Gathering Party	3,183	0.04
Total		7,739,939	100.00
Valid votes		7,739,939	98.07
Invalid/blank votes		152,422	1.93
Total votes		7,892,361	100.00
Registered voters/turnout		9,222,075	85.58
Source: National University of San Martín

=== Chamber of Deputies ===
Party	Votes	%	Seats				
Party	Votes	%	Deputies won	Deputies total	Delegates won	Delegates total	Total seats
Peronist Party	4,977,586	64.28	74	143	9	14	157
Radical Civic Union	2,502,109	32.31	5	12	0	0	12
National Democratic Party	104,006	1.34	0	0	0	0	0
Communist Party of Argentina	88,007	1.14	0	0	0	0	0
Democratic Progressive Party	46,077	0.60	0	0	0	0	0
Socialist Party of the National Revolution	22,516	0.29	0	0	0	0	0
Labour Gathering Party	3,183	0.04	0	0	0	0	0
Total	7,743,484	100.00	79	155	9	14	169
Valid votes	7,743,484	97.93					
Invalid/blank votes	163,374	2.07					
Total votes	7,906,858	100.00					
Registered voters/turnout	9,194,157	86.00					
Source: Nohlen

=== Senate ===
Party	Seats	
Party	Won	Total
Peronist Party	18	34
Radical Civic Union	0	0
National Democratic Party	0	0
Communist Party of Argentina	0	0
Democratic Progressive Party	0	0
Socialist Party of the National Revolution	0	0
Total	18	34
