= 1948 Argentine Constituent Assembly election =

Constituent Assembly elections were held in Argentina on 5 December 1948. The Peronist Party dominated the election, receiving 67% of the vote and winning 109 of the 158 seats. Voter turnout was 74%.

== Results ==
Party	Votes	%	Seats
Peronist Party	1,725,658	66.79	109
Radical Civic Union	767,730	29.71	48
Communist Party	83,490	3.23	0
Labour Gathering Party	4,091	0.16	0
Independent Nationalist Party	1,659	0.06	0
Labour Party	790	0.03	1
Nationalist Liberation Alliance	450	0.02	0
Total	2,583,868	100.00	158
Valid votes	2,583,868	91.35	
Invalid/blank votes (Note: Includes 130,019 in tally sheet differences.)	244,795	8.65	
Total votes	2,828,663	100.00	
Registered voters/turnout	3,807,326	74.30	
Source: Ministry of Interior, Cantón, El Litoral, Castellucci

=== By province ===
Province	Peronist			Radical Civic Union			Others		
Province	Votes	%	Seats	Votes	%	Seats	Votes	%	Seats
Buenos Aires	501,259	67.85	28	215,404	29.16	14	22,151	3.00	—
Buenos Aires City	339,644	58.68	22	201,081	34.74	10	38,105	6.58	—
Catamarca	18,873	77.66	2	5,428	22.34	—	—	—	—
Córdoba	161,312	54.90	10	128,846	43.85	5	3,658	1.24	—
Corrientes	52,870	68.94	5	23,815	31.06	2	—	—	—
Entre Ríos	98,331	66.83	6	48,802	33.17	3	—	—	—
Jujuy	20,042	100	2	—	—	—	—	—	—
La Rioja	16,955	100	2	—	—	—	—	—	—
Mendoza	72,530	71.59	4	21,753	21.47	2	7,027	6.94	—
Salta	24,253	95.14	2	—	—	—	1,240	4.86	1
San Juan	37,096	76.51	2	8,412	17.35	1	2,975	6.14	—
San Luis	18,211	83.40	2	3,462	15.85	1	163	0.75	—
Santa Fe	216,622	70.43	13	80,206	26.08	6	10,741	3.49	—
Santiago del Estero	56,969	84.34	4	8,956	13.26	2	1,623	2.40	—
Tucumán	90,691	78.83	5	21,565	18.74	2	2,797	2.43	—
Total	1,725,658	66.79	109	767,730	29.71	48	90,480	3.50	1
