= 1951 Argentine general election =

- 11 November 1951
- Presidential election
- Registered: 8,613,998
- Turnout: 88.16%
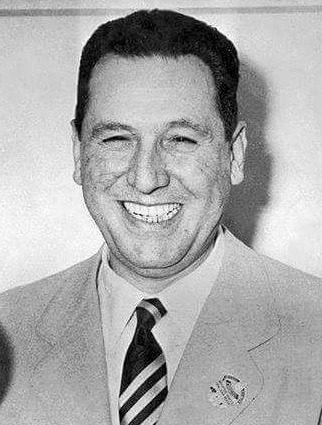

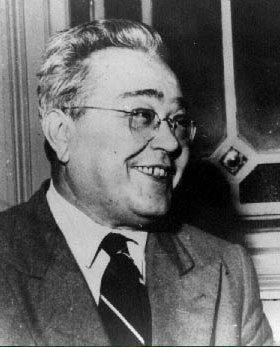
Nominee	Juan Perón	Ricardo Balbín
Party	Peronist Party	Radical Civic Union
Running mate	Hortensio Quijano	Arturo Frondizi
Popular vote	4,745,168	2,415,750
Percentage	63.51%	32.33%
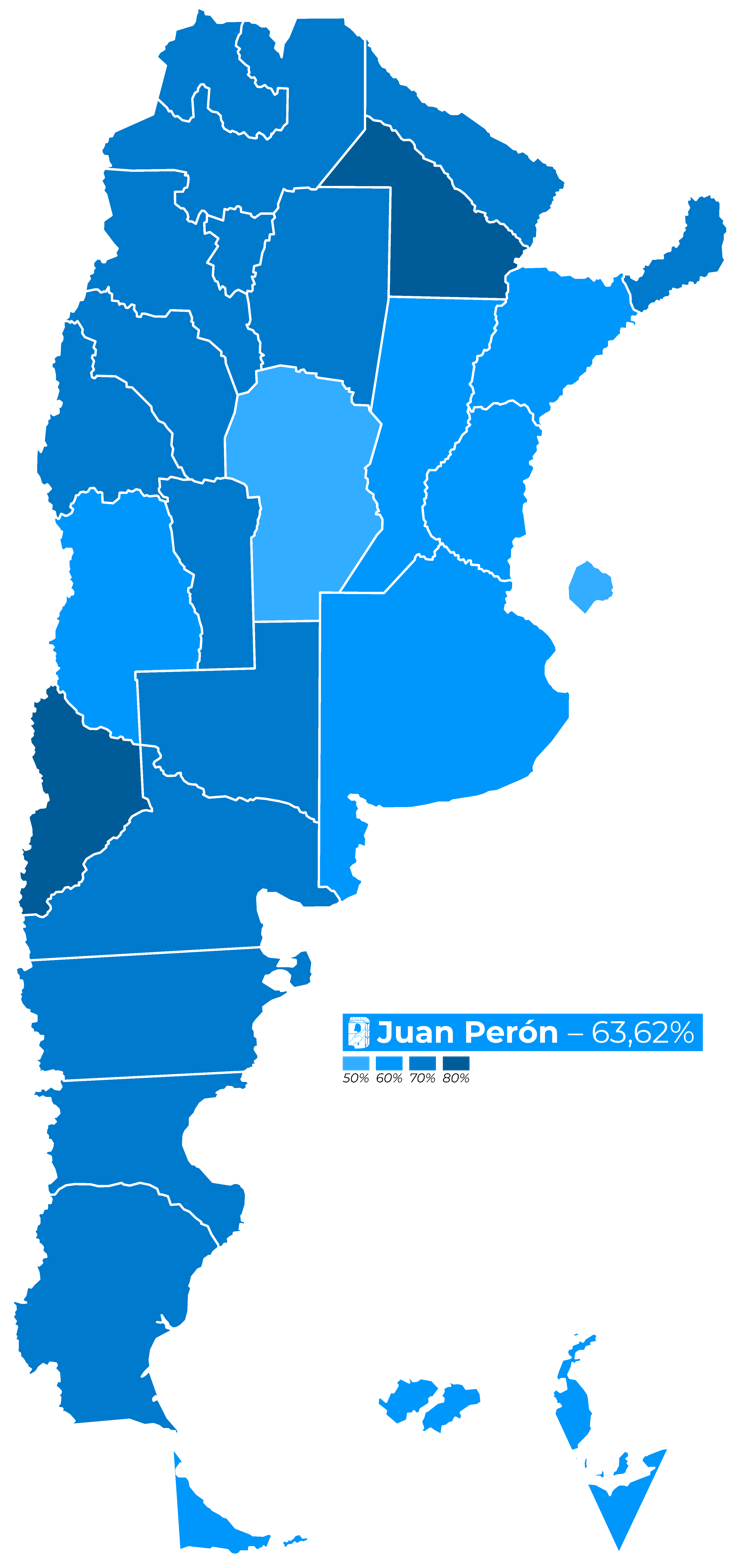
- Results by province
President before election
Juan Perón
Peronist Party
Elected President
Juan Perón
Peronist Party
- Chamber of Deputies election
- All 160 seats in the Chamber of Deputies
- Turnout: 88.46%
Party	Vote %	Seats
Peronist Party	62.20	146
Radical Civic Union	33.05	14
This lists parties that won seats. See the complete results below.
- Senate election
- All 30 seats in the Senate
Party	Seats
Peronist Party	30
This lists parties that won seats. See the complete results below.

General elections were held in Argentina on 11 November 1951. Voters chose both the President of Argentina and their legislators. This was the first election in the country to have enfranchised women at the national level. Turnout was around 88%.

== Background ==
President Juan Perón (1895–1974) had become president for the first time in June 1946. His popularity was riding high following five years of social reforms and a vigorous public works program, but he faced intensifying opposition during 1951. His decision to expropriate the conservative La Prensa (then the nation's second-most circulated daily), though lauded by the CGT labor union, damaged his standing elsewhere at home and his reputation in other countries, as did the climate of political liberties: the opposition UCR's nominee, Congressman Ricardo Balbín, had spent much of the previous year as a political prisoner. Economically, the year was an improvement over the 1949–50 recession and saw the completion of a number of landmark public works and the inaugural of Channel 13 (Public Television), the first regular broadcast station in Latin America; but growing inflation (50%, a record at the time) led to increasing strike activity.

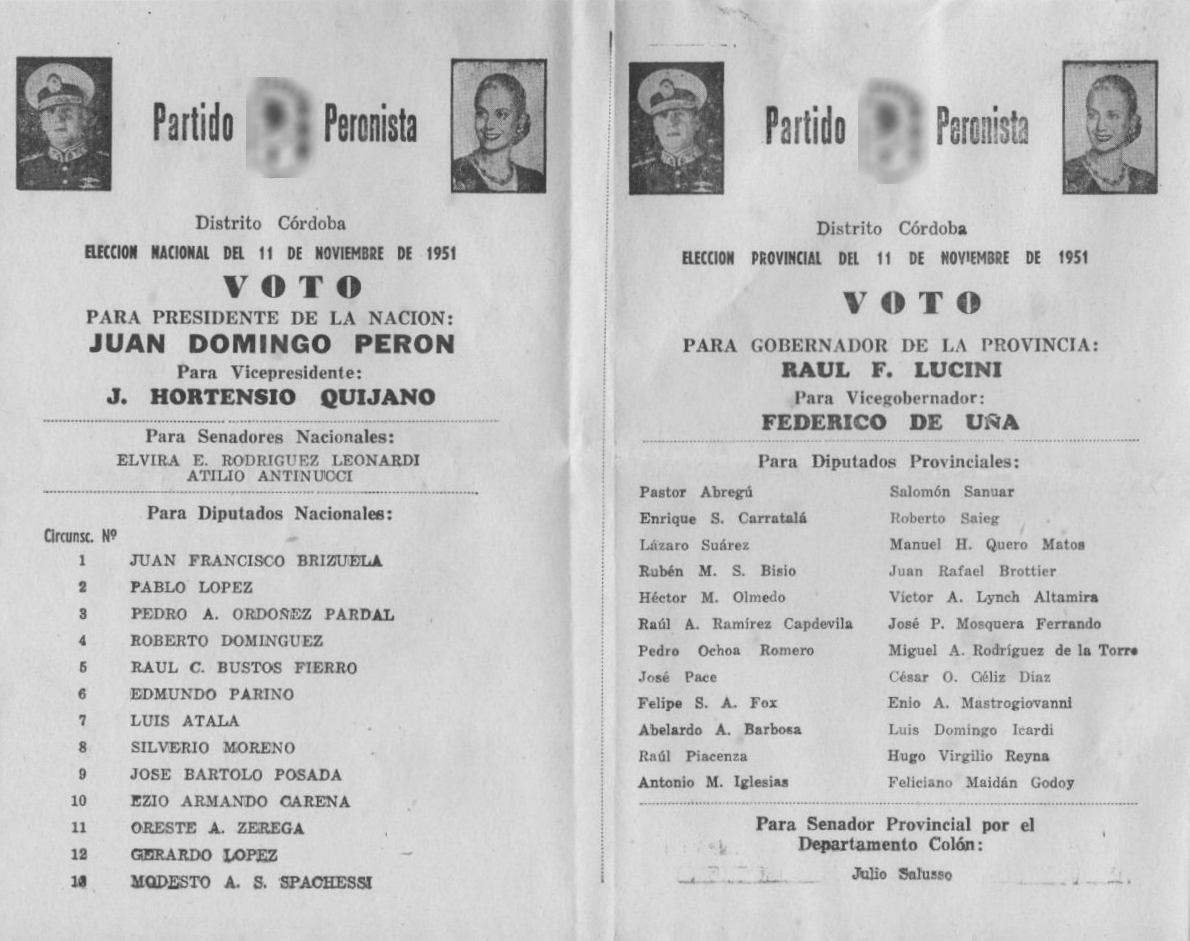
Ballot paper for Perón - Quijano.

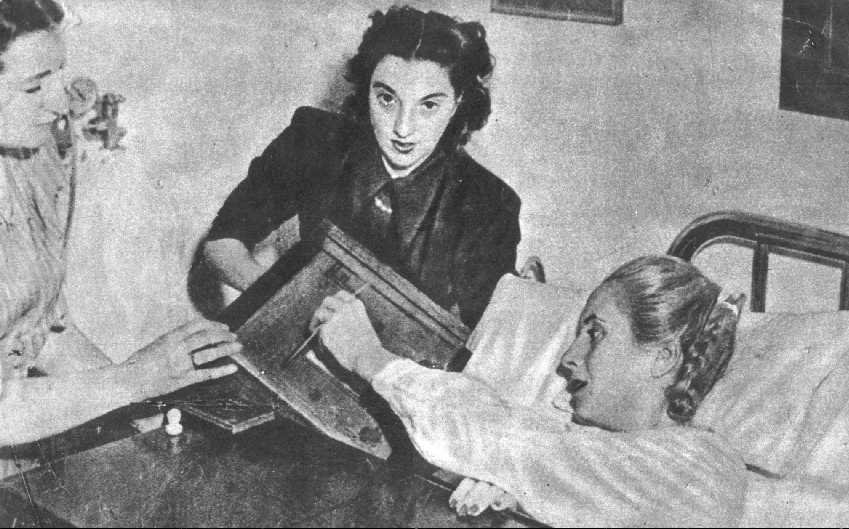
The ailing Eva Perón (right) casts a vote for the "reason of her life," President Juan Perón.

The UCR and other parties in opposition, harassed and deprived of access to the media, boycotted a number of Congressional races and all Senate races as well. The vice president, Hortensio Quijano, had requested leave from the campaign due to failing health and, on August 22, the CGT organized a rally on Buenos Aires' massive Ninth of July Avenue in support of the influential first lady Eva Perón as her husband's running mate, though unbeknownst to the crowd, the popular Evita was, like Quijano, dying, and thus refused the acclamation. Quijano reluctantly stayed on; but his stepping aside did not prevent a September 28 coup attempt against Perón on the part of ultraconservative elements in the Army. Ultimately, these ill-considered attacks, the Peróns' popularity and their control of much of the media combined to give the Peronist Party a landslide in the election, the first at the national level in which the vote was extended to women.

== Candidates ==
- Peronist Party: President Juan Perón of Buenos Aires Province
- Radical Civic Union: Congressman Ricardo Balbín of Buenos Aires Province
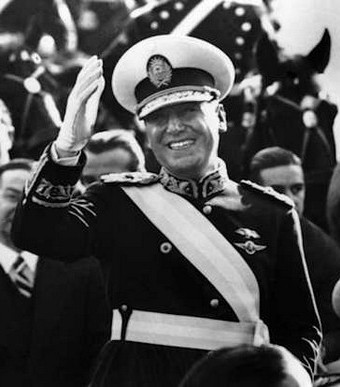
Incumbent President Juan Perón

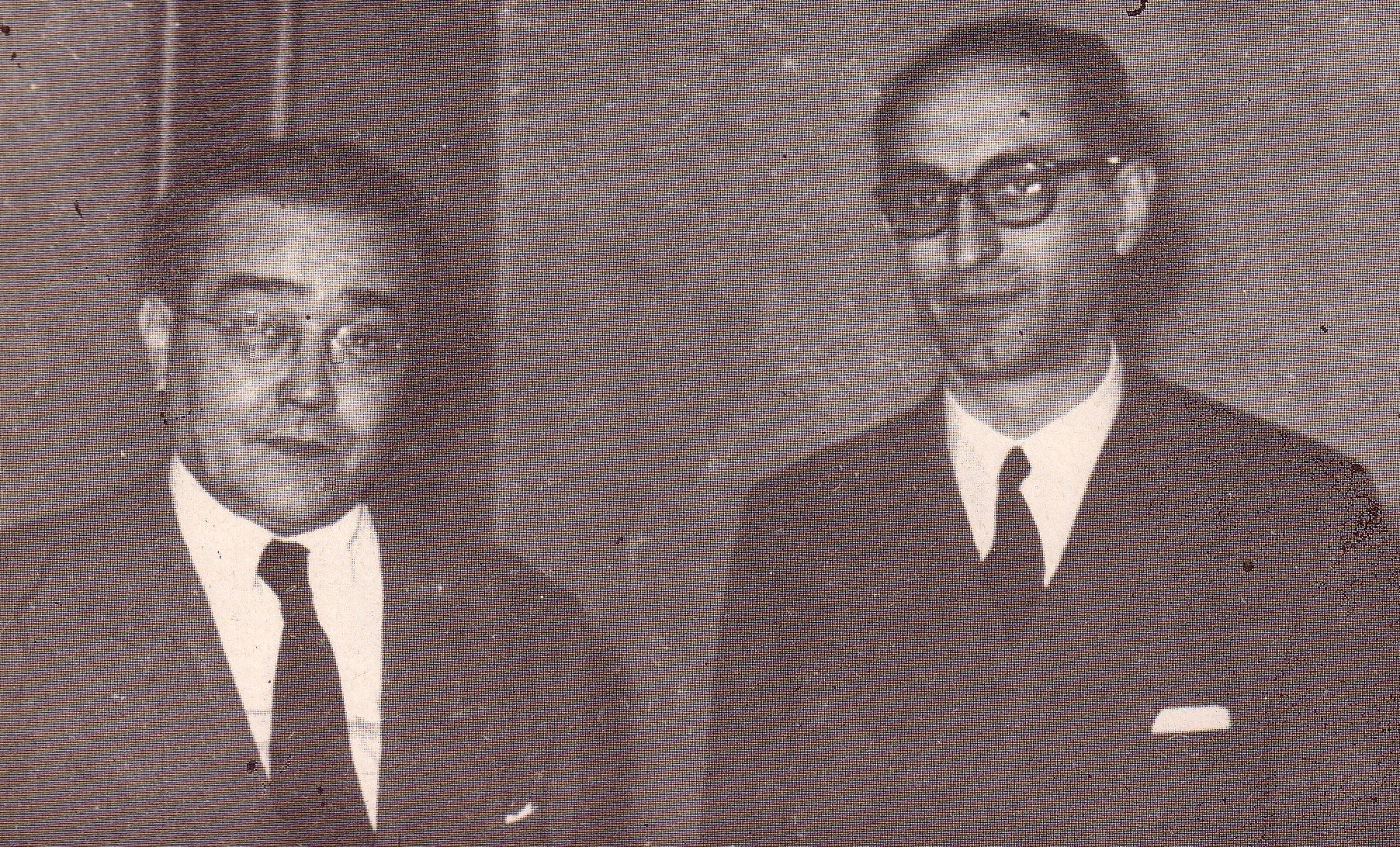
Balbín (left) and running mate Arturo Frondizi

== Results ==
=== President ===
Candidate	Running mate	Party or alliance		Votes	%
Juan Domingo Perón	Hortensio Quijano	Peronist Party		4,745,168	63.51
Ricardo Balbín	Arturo Frondizi	Balbín–Frondizi	Radical Civic Union	2,404,302	32.18
Ricardo Balbín	Arturo Frondizi	Balbín–Frondizi	Unionist Radical Civic Union	11,448	0.15
Ricardo Balbín	Arturo Frondizi	Balbín–Frondizi	Total	2,415,750	32.33
Reynaldo Pastor	Vicente Solano Lima	National Democratic Party		174,399	2.33
Rodolfo Ghioldi	Alcira de la Peña	Communist Party		71,318	0.95
Alfredo Palacios	Américo Ghioldi	Socialist Party		54,920	0.74
Genaro Giacobini	Jorge Francisco Rivero	Public Health Party		5,512	0.07
Luciano Molinas	Juan A. Díaz Arana	Democratic Progressive Party		2,634	0.04
José Fernando Penelón	Beniamino A. Semiza	Labour Gathering Party		1,233	0.02
No candidate	No candidate	Nationalist Civic Union		163	0.00
Total				7,471,097	100.00
Valid votes				7,471,097	98.38
Invalid/blank votes				123,051	1.62
Total votes				7,594,148	100.00
Registered voters/turnout				8,613,998	88.16
Source: Ministry of the Interior Cantón

=== Chamber of Deputies ===
Party	Votes	%	Seats				
Party	Votes	%	Deputies 1952–1955	Deputies 1952–1958	Delegates 1952–1955	Delegates 1952–1958	Total
Peronist Party	4,482,973	62.20	67	68	6	5	146
Radical Civic Union	2,381,990	33.05	7	7	0	0	14
National Democratic Party	177,985	2.47	0	0	0	0	0
Socialist Party	73,927	1.03	0	0	0	0	0
Communist Party	71,124	0.99	0	0	0	0	0
Unionist Radical Civic Union	14,843	0.21	0	0	0	0	0
Labour Gathering Party	1,276	0.02	0	0	0	0	0
Democratic Progressive Party	1,125	0.02	0	0	0	0	0
Nationalist Civic Union	90	0.00	0	0	0	0	0
Others	1,540	0.02	0	0	0	0	0
Total	7,206,873	100.00	74	75	6	5	160
Valid votes	7,206,873	97.67					
Invalid/blank votes	171,984	2.33					
Total votes	7,378,857	100.00					
Registered voters/turnout	8,341,443	88.46					
Source: Ministry of the Interior

=== Senate ===
Party	Seats		
Party	1952–1955	1952–1958	Total
Peronist Party	15	15	30
Radical Civic Union	0	0	0
National Democratic Party	0	0	0
Socialist Party	0	0	0
Communist Party	0	0	0
Democratic Progressive Party	0	0	0
Total	15	15	30

=== Provincial governors ===
Election of Provincial Governors
Elected positions: 14 governors, 14 legislative bodies Presidential appointment: 9 territorial governors, Mayor of the city of Buenos Aires
Date	Province	Elected	Winner	Runner-up
11 November	Buenos Aires	Governor; Vice Governor; Provincial legislatures	Carlos Aloé (Partido Peronista) (62,99 %)	Crisólogo Larralde (Unión Cívica Radical) (33,30 %)
11 November	Catamarca	Governor; Vice Governor; Provincial legislatures	Armando Casas Nóblega (Partido Peronista) (76,66 %)	Ramón Edgardo Acuña (Unión Cívica Radical) (21,58 %)
11 November	Córdoba	Governor; Vice Governor; Provincial legislatures	Raúl Lucini (Partido Peronista) (51,98 %)	Arturo Umberto Illia (Unión Cívica Radical) (43,08 %)
11 November	Corrientes	Governor; Vice Governor; Provincial legislatures	Raúl Benito Castillo (Partido Peronista) (64,36 %)	Héctor Lomónaco (Unión Cívica Radical) (26,70 %)
11 November	Entre Ríos	Governor; Vice Governor; Provincial legislatures	Felipe Texier (Partido Peronista) (63,07 %)	Fermín J. Garay (Unión Cívica Radical) (32,68 %)
11 November	Jujuy	Governor; Vice Governor; Provincial legislatures	Jorge Villafañe (Partido Peronista) (79,29 %)	Horacio Guzmán (Unión Cívica Radical) (15,01 %)
11 November	La Rioja	Governor; Vice Governor; Provincial legislatures	Juan Melis (Partido Peronista) (73,97 %)	Herminio Torres Brizuela (Unión Cívica Radical) (26,03 %)
11 November	Mendoza	Governor; Vice Governor; Provincial legislatures	Carlos Horacio Evans (Partido Peronista) (66,89 %)	Leopoldo Suárez (Unión Cívica Radical) (21,22 %)
11 November	Salta	Governor; Vice Governor; Provincial legislatures	Ricardo Joaquín Durand (Partido Peronista) (76,37 %)	Ricardo E. Aráoz (Unión Cívica Radical) (23,34 %)
11 November	San Juan	Governor; Vice Governor; Provincial legislatures	Rinaldo Viviani (Partido Peronista) (78,67 %)	Juan Pascual Pringles (Unión Cívica Radical) (16,57 %)
11 November	San Luis	Governor; Provincial legislatures	Víctor Endeiza (Partido Peronista) (71,16 %)	Julio Domeniconi (Unión Cívica Radical) (15,83 %)
11 November	Santa Fe	Governor; Vice Governor; Provincial legislatures	Luis Cárcamo (Partido Peronista) (64,92 %)	Alfredo Julio Grassi (Unión Cívica Radical) (33,08 %)
11 November	Santiago del Estero	Governor; Provincial legislatures	Francisco González (Partido Peronista) (78,72 %)	Hugo Catella (Unión Cívica Radical) (14,06 %)
11 November	Tucumán	Governor; Vice Governor; Provincial legislatures	Luis Cruz (Partido Peronista) (70,70 %)	Celestino Gelsi (Unión Cívica Radical) (27,40 %)
