= 1948 Argentine legislative election =

- 7 March 1948
- 83 of the 158 seats in the Chamber of Deputies
- Turnout: 75.19%
Party	Vote %	Seats	+/–
Peronist Party	56.32	58	+2
Radical Civic Union	24.49	23	0
National Democratic Party	3.66	1	−1
Revolutionary Worker's Front	0.88	1	New
This lists parties that won seats. See the complete results below.
Results by province
President of the Chamber of Deputies before	President of the Chamber of Deputies after
Ricardo Guardo; UCR-JR	Héctor José Cámpora; Peronist

Legislative elections were held in Argentina on 7 March 1948.

== Background ==
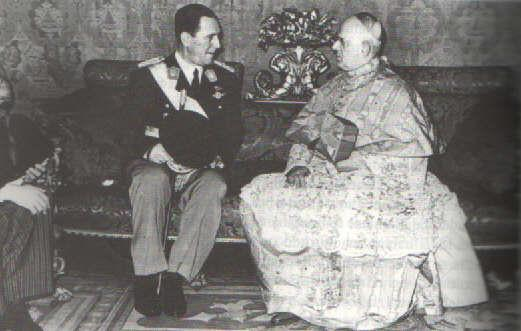
President Juan Perón and Cardinal Copello confer shortly after the approval of the 1949 Constitution. Perón maintained the Church's support for his early reforms by assuring the curia a voice in his ambitious agenda.

Elected in early 1946 on a populist platform, President Juan Perón undertook a program of nationalization of strategic industries and services, as well as the vigorous support of demands for higher wages (led by the rapidly growing CGT labor union). He also took care to cultivate Church-state relations in Argentina, making religious instruction mandatory and regularly consulting the Archbishop of Buenos Aires, Cardinal Copello, on social policy. These moves and economic growth of nearly a fourth in his first two years led to a positive showing in legislative elections on March 7 - held only week after the nationalization of British railways in Argentina, and during Perón's appendectomy. Half the seats in the Lower House were renewed, and its makeup changed only somewhat in favor of Peronists.

The opposition had dissolved their 1945 alliance, the Democratic Union; but they rallied behind and largely endorsed the only party significant enough to challenge Perón: the centrist Radical Civic Union (UCR). The president moved quickly to consolidate his political power, replacing the Labor Party that elected him with a Peronist Party, in 1947, and purging universities and the Supreme Court of opposition. The brazen moves were followed by the Peronists' introduction in Congress of a bill mandating an assembly for the replacement of the 1853 Constitution. Debate in Congress, where the UCR had retained a sizable minority, was heated throughout 1948, though the bill was approved by 96 out of 158 congressmen. The UCR itself was divided during the vote; a faction that had supported Perón (the "Renewal Group," led by Amadeo Sabattini) abstained in an attempt to deprive the vote of quorum, and ultimately broke with Perón.

Elections for the 158 assemblymen were called for December 5. Results closely mirrored those of the legislative elections, though blank voting increased as a result of Congressman Sabattini's call. One Peronist assemblyman was elected as a "Labor Party" candidate, joining Sabattini's opposition to its redesignation as a "Peronist" party. UCR assemblymen, for their part, attended only the inaugural session to espress their opposition to the body's legality. The assembly concluded its proceeding on March 16, 1949, with a new constitution granting the president the right to seek reelection, depriving Congress of its right to override vetoes, enacting social guarantees, and enhancing the state's rights over natural resources - all designed to advance Perón's agenda at the time.

== Results ==
Party	Votes	%	Seats	
Party	Votes	%	Won	Total
Peronist Party	1,431,284	56.32	58	111
Radical Civic Union	622,453	24.49	23	44
Socialist Party	151,581	5.96	0	0
National Democratic Party	93,012	3.66	1	2
Communist Party of Argentina	88,190	3.47	0	0
Worker's Party of the Revolution	56,377	2.22	0	0
Democratic Progressive Party	50,181	1.97	0	0
Revolutionary Worker's Front	22,245	0.88	1	1
Nationalist Liberation Alliance	11,604	0.46	0	0
Labour Gathering Party	4,205	0.17	0	0
Independent Labour Party	3,081	0.12	0	0
Labour Party	1,705	0.07	0	0
Agrarian Social Party	1,544	0.06	0	0
Nationalist Party	887	0.03	0	0
Argentine Renewal Youth	818	0.03	0	0
October 17th Labour Party	591	0.02	0	0
Others	1,446	0.06	0	0
Total	2,541,204	100.00	83	158
Valid votes	2,541,204	97.04		
Invalid/blank votes	77,576	2.96		
Total votes	2,618,780	100.00		
Registered voters/turnout	3,494,620	74.94		
Source: Ministry of the Interior

=== Results by province ===
Province	Peronist			Radical Civic Union			Others		
Province	Votes	%	Seats	Votes	%	Seats	Votes	%	Seats
Buenos Aires	431,360	60.54	16	201,941	28.34	7	79,225	11.12	0
Buenos Aires City	307,828	50.24	11	125,569	20.49	5	179,305	29.27	0
Córdoba	163,774	53.68	7	117,218	38.42	3	24,128	7.91	0
Corrientes	49,976	60.56	3	17,739	21.50	1	14,804	17.94	0
Entre Ríos	86,468	58.47	4	45,604	30.84	2	15,809	10.69	0
Mendoza	62,004	63.42	2	17,221	17.61	1	18,548	18.97	0
San Juan	36,555	77.19	1	6,094	12.87	0	4,708	9.95	0
San Luis	18,081	68.58	2	3,029	11.49	0	5,253	19.93	1
Santa Fe	153,547	46.26	7	60,324	18.17	3	118,081	35.57	0
Santiago del Estero	54,901	76.58	2	14,732	20.55	1	2,059	2.88	0
Tucumán	66,790	63.42	3	12,982	12.33	0	25,547	24.26	1
Total	1,431,284	56.32	58	622,453	24.49	23	487,467	19.19	2
