= Cipriano Reyes =

Argentinian politician

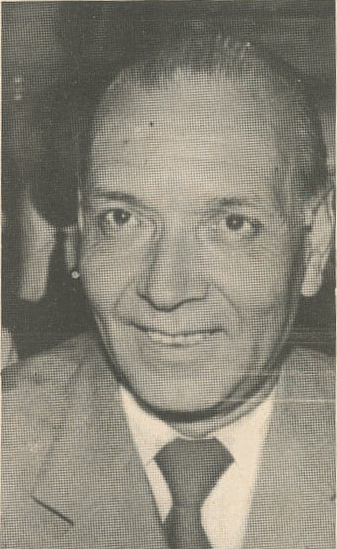
Cipriano Reyes

Cipriano Reyes (7 August 1906 – 1 August 2001) was an Argentine politician and labour union leader. He led several labour organizations related to the meat industry and also founded the Labour Party. Initially a supporter of Juan Domingo Perón, he was a key figure in organizing the mobilization of 17 October 1945 to demand Perón's release, an event that later became a symbol of Peronist iconography, known as Loyalty Day.

== Biography ==
The son of Uruguayan circus workers, he was born in the city of Lincoln. Despite his early interest in history and poetry, he had to start working at the age of 14 in a meat processing plant, where he began organizing some of the first unions for workers in this field. He became the leader of the Meat Industry Workers Federation, displacing the Communist leader José Peter in 1943. At the time, labour unions were largely dominated by Communist activists and anarchists. Reyes worked closely with the leaders of the 1943 Argentine Revolution, including military personnel and other union leaders. Among these military figures, he developed a close relationship with Juan Domingo Perón, then Secretary of Labour of Argentina. When Perón was incarcerated in 1945, Reyes organized a massive mobilization of workers to demand his release. This date is considered the origin of the Peronist movement.

Once Perón was freed, Reyes founded the Labour Party to support Perón's presidential candidacy in the elections held on 24 February 1946. Perón, backed by the Labour Party and a coalition of other parties, won the election. Meanwhile, Reyes was elected National Deputy representing the province of Buenos Aires.

The conflict with Perón began before he took office, on 23 May 1946, when he decided to dissolve all the parties that had supported his candidacy, including the Labour Party. Perón's intention was to create his own political party with himself as the sole leader. While some parties accepted this decision, Reyes refused to dissolve the Labour Party and attempted, unsuccessfully, to negotiate its continued prominence.

Following this conflict, an attempt was made on Reyes's life while he was travelling in a taxi. He survived the attack, but the taxi driver was killed, and Reyes sustained serious injuries. In September 1948, Perón's government announced it had thwarted a plot to assassinate Perón and his wife Eva, allegedly orchestrated by Reyes, to take place at the Colón Theatre on 12 October. Reyes was arrested and tortured. While he was in prison, two of his brothers were assassinated in La Plata. The government denied any connection to the murders, claiming they were the result of an old dispute between Reyes and the former Meat Federation leader, José Peter.

Reyes was released after the overthrow of Perón in 1955 and attempted to reorganize the Labour Party. He was elected as a delegate to the constitutional convention tasked with repealing the Peronist Constitution of 1949.
