= Loyalty Day (Argentina) =

Holiday in Argentina commemorating the founding of Peronism (17 October 1945)

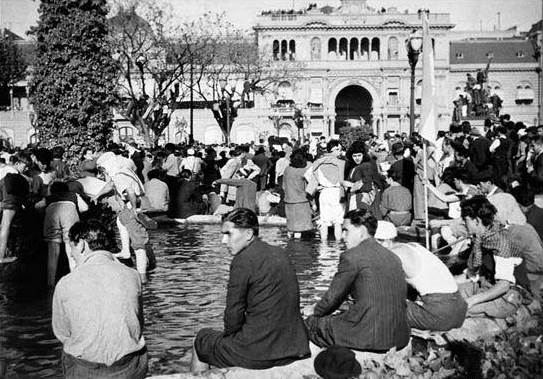
- One of the most famous photos from the event
- Date: 17 October 1945
- Location: Plaza de Mayo, Buenos Aires
- Participants: Peronists
- Outcome: Juan Perón was released from prison

Loyalty Day (Spanish: Día de la lealtad) is a commemoration day in Argentina. It remembers 17 October 1945, when a large labour demonstration at the Plaza de Mayo, in downtown Buenos Aires, demanded the liberation of Juan Domingo Perón, jailed on Isla Martín García. It is considered the foundational moment of the Peronist movement.

== Antecedents ==
On 4 June 1943, nationalist sectors of the Argentine Armed Forces led by General Arturo Rawson orchestrated a coup d'état against President Ramón Castillo, the last president of the Infamous Decade, a line of corrupt governments that had imposed the so-called "patriotic fraud" since the end of the José Félix Uriburu administration.

The labor movement was against the coup, initially perplexed and undecided about the position that should be adopted. It was divided into the four main groups (CGT N º 1, CGT No. 2, USA and FORA). One of the first actions was to dissolve the government CGT No. 2 (led by the socialist Francisco Pérez Leirós), the Employees' Union of trade unions of Borlenghi and the communist-led unions (construction workers, meatpackers, etc.). It led to a number of unions that formed it to return to the CGT N º 1 (general secretary José Domenech). Shortly after, the government passed a law on trade unions that met some expectations except for union, while allowing them to intervene by the State. Then the military government applied this law to the powerful rail unions involved and the heart of the CGT, the Union Railway and the Brotherhood. In October a series of strikes were answered with the arrest of dozens of labor leaders. It soon became apparent that the military government was composed of influential anti-union sectors.

Under these conditions some union socialists, trade unionists and some communist revolutionaries led by Ángel Borlenghi (a socialist and secretary general of the powerful General Confederation of Employees of Commerce in the dissolved socialist CGT No. 2), Francisco Pablo Capozzi (PFI), Juan Bramuglia (Railway Union), among others, agreed, albeit with reservations and distrust, to undertake a series of alliances with certain sectors of the military government which shared the union demands. Among young military colonels were Juan D. Perón and Domingo Mercante.

The union proposed the military create a Ministry of Labor, strengthen the CGT and enact a series of labor laws that accepted the historical claims of the Argentine labor movement. Soon after, the alliance between trade unionists and military government appointed Perón as Director of the Department of Labor, a position apparently worthless. A month later, the status of the organism raised to a Secretary of State (December 2, 1943). From the Department of Labor, Perón, with the support of the unions began to develop much of the historic union agenda: it created employment tribunals; 33.302/43 Decree was passed extending the severance pay to all workers, more than two million people were beneficiaries of the retirement was enacted the Statute of farm workers and the status of the journalist, it created the Polyclinic Hospital for railway workers, prohibiting private placement agencies, the Technical Schools aimed at workers; 123 more decrees were signed. In 1944 collective agreements reached more than 1,400,000 workers and employees, and in 1945 another 347 covered 2,186,868 workers. Additionally Perón succeeded to repeal the decree-law regulating unions sanctioned in the first days of military rule.

Within this framework, the unions began a period of high growth, and what was even more important, they began to recruit large numbers to the "new" workers, who were migrating en masse to the city from the countryside, called "morochos "" fat "and" black heads "with the middle and upper classes and the workers themselves" old "descendants of European immigration.

Soon after, some unions that had remained aloof, the CGT N º 1, the USA and the autonomous unions, are beginning to unite around the Secretary of Labor. But to the contrary, in September 1945, 4 major unions split from the CGT: Fraternity, the Textile Workers Union, the Confederation of Commercial Employees and the Union of Footwear.

The alliance between unions and the group of young military officers led by Perón immediately generated strong opposition from conservative political, economic and military, with support from the U.S. Embassy (Ambassador Braden) that generates a high polarization for 1945. The events unfolded rapidly.

On 12 July 1945, the trade unions led by Borlenghi perform a large act of downtown Buenos Aires (on Diagonal Norte and Florida). When finished, the crowd of workers begin to chant the name of Perón and proclaim it as a candidate for president.

The workers' demonstration was answered on September 19 by the middle and upper classes with the "March of the Constitution and Freedom," which brought the extraordinary sum of 200,000 people marching in the upscale Recoleta ward, where supporters of the Former President Arturo Rawson gathered at the balcony of his house.

== October Days ==
General Eduardo Ávalos demanded Perón's resignation, organizing a military show of force in support of this on 8 October; the military government, to avoid conflict, accepted, and Perón resigned the next day.

On 10 October, upon Perón's leaving office as vice president, the CGT held a rally in his support in the corner of Peru and Alsina Streets, downtown. He directed himself to the rally, and gave a famous speech in which he detailed an ambitious program to redress labor grievances. On 11 October Ávalos took over as Minister of War, and that night a meeting was held at the Military Club (Paz Palace) with nearly 300 officers, among whom were about 20 of the Navy, to discuss the course to be followed, including as to whether to retain Farrell as president. The assembly decided to send a delegation to meet with Ávalos and, indeed, the only points that had agreed was to request the immediate convocation of elections, the appointment of civilian ministers, lifting the siege and the arrest and prosecution of Perón. Concurrently, a senior Senator from the Socialist Party of Argentina, Alfredo Palacios, obtained a Supreme Court ruling against the regime, and when the Paz Palace meeting ended at midnight, a presidential decree calling for elections was announced on the airwaves.

A meeting of opposition leaders gathered around a Democratic Coordinating Board on 11 October. Emboldened by the course of events, the Army decided to demand that power be handed over to the Supreme Court. Historian Félix Luna wrote on the lack of realism that made this decision such a tactical mistake:

While the army was divided into sectors that had serious disagreements, none of them could accept at that time give the government to recognize the Court as it involved a humiliating defeat. Moreover, the Chief Justice was Dr. Roberto Repetto, a respected jurist but lacking any political experience.

On 12 October, after receiving the military delegation, Farrell called for the resignation of all ministers except Ávalos; Lima Vernengo was appointed as Minister of the Navy. At the same time, a demonstration was held around the Paz Palace by the most conservative students, who shouted anti-military slogans and seized the building. They demanded the Supreme Court's intervention against Perón and any government decision on his behalf, a position which further unified the latter's base of support.

When in the afternoon a delegation of civilians took this position to Ávalos, the War Minister considered unacceptable, tried to reassure them and informed them that she will be arrested. The delegation returned to inform the protesters, who were still in place, causing visible irritation. On several occasions there had been clashes between elements Alliance and students, about nine o'clock that night without any clear explanation of its origin had a violent shootout between police and a group of protesters who threw the one person dead and more than fifty wounded.

Eva Perón drove on the morning of Thursday the 11th with "Rudi" Freude, son of a friend, and Juan Duarte (brother of Eva Perón) to San Nicolás island first and then to the Delta, leaving Mercante with instructions to cooperate with police, rather than hide".

On 12 October, President Farrell ordered the arrest of Perón. The police came to fetch him from his apartment on Calle Posadas, in the Retiro ward of Buenos Aires, and Mercante told the sheriff where he was and the next day. Perón was taken into custody at the gunboat Independencia, which in turn moved to Martín García Island. Following the arrest, the newspaper Crítica (then the most widely circulated news daily in Argentina), announced on the front page that: Perón is no longer a threat to the country.

On Saturday, 13 October, Farrell met with the Attorney General, Dr. Juan Álvarez, and proposed to Ávalos that he form a new cabinet with the latter as a sort of Prime Minister, thus following a suggestion made to him by former Córdoba Province Governor Amadeo Sabattini. It was a compromise in which no transfer power to the Court was entrusted to a renowned civil conduction process leading to elections. Álvarez took his time: one day to consult before accepting the job and four days of consultations for candidates, presenting his list for these on 17 October.

On the night of Tuesday the 16th, a Confederal Committee meeting of the General Confederation of Labor (CGT) decided to call a strike for the 18th. The reason for the strike was expressed in a number of issues including freedom of political prisoners, calling for elections, maintaining the gains of workers, etc.. but, significantly, did not mention Perón. The explanation is that many leaders were not convinced to support Perón, so the favorable sector due to unemployment in the text to make concessions to reach a majority

A significant section of the CGT, enlisted in the Communist and Socialist parties Perón identified with Nazism and demanded his dismissal, coinciding with the U.S. Embassy.

While the CGT hosted the mobilization to be held the next day, the strike served as a driver for several unions and workers in general, were on alert after days earlier, felt backed for actions to take.

Perón, citing health problems, managed to move him to a military hospital in the Belgrano district of Buenos Aires, where they arrive on the morning of 17 October.

== 17 October ==
The mobilization of workers began at dawn in the southern Buenos Aires neighborhoods of La Boca, Barracas, Parque Patricios, as well as in working class suburbs further south, such as Avellaneda, Berazategui, Lanús and Quilmes, as well as other, surrounding industrial areas. Among the first to mobilize en masse were abattoir workers led by Cipriano Reyes in La Plata then home to numerous meat packing establishments, such as the important Swift-Armour plant.

The march swelled with those who left factories and shops, and refrained from directly entering workplaces themselves. Initially the police lifted the bridges over the Riachuelo that led into the capital, and some protesters crossed by swimming or on rafts until bridges were later lowered; some members of the police force exchanged expressions of sympathy with the demonstrators. The marchers' many banners included slogans that had nothing to do with the claims of the CGT; but expressed their support for Perón and demanded his release.

President Edelmiro Farrell had a laissez-faire attitude. The new Minister of War General Eduardo Ávalos watched the protesters and refused to mobilize the troops of the Campo de Mayo, which could have reached the federal capital in a few hours, as claimed by some officers of the army and the Minister of Marine. Ávalos was confident the demonstration would dissolve by itself; but instead found that they became increasingly numerous, and ultimately agreed to hold talks with Perón in the Military Hospital. They had a short meeting to agree on the conditions: Perón would speak to reassure the protesters, without making reference to his arrest, and persuade them to disperse; in return, the entire cabinet would resign, as would Ávalos.

At 10:30 pm that day, Dr. Juan Álvarez had attended Government House to deliver a letter with the names proposed for ministers together with the curriculum of them and their acceptance to the charges. He was received with bewilderment in the midst of the disorder that existed at the time on site, and fired him with courtesy. The list was, according to Luna, a scorn for the country, it included people with a highly questionable history as far their democratic credentials. These included, Jorge Figueroa Alcorta, proposed for Minister Justice and Public Instruction, who had been involved in a 1942 plot with military cadets; Alberto Hueyo for the Treasury, who had been director of the CHADE electric utility when it fraudulently obtained an extension of its concession; Tomás Amadeo for Agriculture, was a close friend of U.S. Ambassador Spruille Braden; Antonio Vaquer for Public Works, who had been an official in President Roberto Marcelino Ortiz's Coordination of Transportation, a unit established at the behest of British tram businesses, to the detriment of local businesses collectives.

At 11:10 pm, and before a crowd estimated at 300,000 people, Perón appeared at the main balcony of the Casa Rosada, the nation's executive government offices. He thanked those present, recalling his work in government, reported on his request for retirement, pledged to continue defending the interests of workers and, finally, asked those present to disperse in peace, urging instead that they maintain the general strike the following day.

=== Number of attendees ===
The number of attendees varies considerably depending on the sources: some estimate millions of attendees and others give lower figures. According to Félix Luna, there were between 200,000 and 300,000 demonstrators. The labor movement historian Oscar Troncoso notes that the estimate accepted by police experts for demonstrations in open spaces is between 3 and 4 people per square meter, because from street level the crowd appears compact, but from above empty spaces can be seen. Calculations by the Municipality of the City of Buenos Aires gave Plaza de Mayo an area of 18,591.83 square meters, which at a maximum of 4 people per meter gives 74,367 people. If part of the diagonals and Avenida de Mayo are added, a maximum of between 100,000 and 120,000 people could fit. All subsequent Peronist propaganda emphasized the figure of 500,000 people published by Eduardo Colom—later elected a Peronist national deputy—in the chronicle of the newspaper La Época; in the following years, to maintain that image, the Secretariat of Press and Diffusion used photographs and newsreels from the large demonstrations after 1945.

=== Speech ===
At 23:10, in Plaza de Mayo, Perón appeared on a balcony of the Government House and delivered a historic speech to the crowd, in which he promised to continue defending workers and asked them to return to their homes.

Some of his words were:

"It has been almost two years since from these same balconies I said that I had three honors: that of being a soldier, that of being a patriot, and that of being the first Argentine worker. This afternoon, the Executive Power has signed my request for retirement from the Army. With this I have voluntarily renounced the distinguished honor to which I could have continued to aspire, that of becoming a soldier of the nation. I wish to remain Colonel Perón and offer myself to the people under this name. I now put away my honorable uniform given to me by the nation in order to wear civilian dress, to mingle with that sweating and suffering mass that builds the greatness of the nation. With this I give my final embrace in this way to that magnificent pillar of the nation which is the Army."

[...]

"This is the suffering people that represent the pain of the motherland. It is the people of the nation. It is the same people that in this historic square demanded before Congress that their will and their rights be respected. This true celebration of democracy is represented by a people who march for hours and hours on foot to ask their officials to fulfill their duty. I have often attended workers' meetings. I have always known of their emotion, but this time this gathering constitutes a true source of pride for all Argentines."

[...]

"Remember, workers, that it is more necessary than ever that you unite as brothers and seek through that unity the unity of all Argentines."

== Immediate effects ==
Perón's resignation on 8 October 1945 was the result of loss of support in the army commanders. Based on the letter sent to Eva Duarte from Martín García Island, it can be considered at the time Perón was determined to retire from politics. The mobilization of 17 October had two immediate effects: it forced Perón to return to the political struggle, and persuaded the Army to turning in his favor before those among the military leadership opposed to him could organize their colleagues against him.

After a short period of rest, he and Eva Duarte were married on 22 October, following which Perón began his political campaign. Former Governor Sabattini and others within the UCR formed the Junta Renovadora ("Renewal Board"), which joined independents in endorsing the Labor Party. The influential FORJA ("Wrought") faction of the UCR, led by Arturo Jauretche, disbanded to join the Peronist movement; Jauretche was later appointed Director of the Bank of the Province of Buenos Aires. Domingo Mercante was appointed to head the Department of Labor. A colonel tied to the principal rail workers' union, he helped rally organized labor in support for the Perón campaign.

The opposition parties formed the Democratic Union, an alliance centered on the presidential ticket nominated by the Radical Civic Union. The Perón-Quijano ticket won the 1946 election on 24 February with 54% of the vote.

== The years afterward ==
After the democratic restoration of 1983, the commemoration has generally been limited to leaders of the so-called "historical Peronism" and does not include mass demonstrations.

On 17 October 2019, a public event for Loyalty Day was held in Santa Rosa, La Pampa, at which many of the leaders who would later form part of the government of the Frente de Todos met, such as Alberto Fernández, Cristina Fernández de Kirchner and Sergio Massa. This meeting symbolized the unity of Peronism ahead of the elections, which, in Alberto's words, "It is the first Loyalty Day in which we have only one event, jointly among all."

== Interpretations ==
According to historian José Luis Romero, the movement was organized by sectors already considered Peronist, who, with military and police support, organized the popular movement to secure Perón's return.

== Beginning of television in Argentina ==
The date is also related to television in Argentina, as Loyalty Day 1951 would also mark the beginning of transmissions of the state-owned TV station Televisión Pública, which was launched on that date. As a result, the date is also celebrated as "Television Day" in Argentina.
