= Hortensio Quijano =

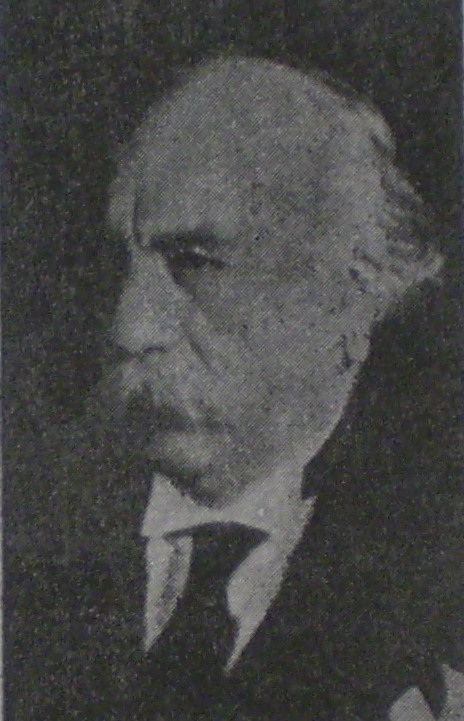
- Vice President Juan Hortensio Quijano

22nd Vice President of Argentina
- In office June 4, 1946 – April 3, 1952
- President: Juan Perón
- Preceded by: Juan Pistarini
- Succeeded by: Alberto Teisaire (1954)

Personal details
- Born: June 10, 1884; Goya, Corrientes, Corrientes Province Argentina
- Died: April 3, 1952; Buenos Aires (aged 67)
- Party: UCR (1908–1932); UCR-A (1932–1945); UCR-Renewal Group (1945–1946); Labor Party (1946–1947); Peronist (1947–1952)

Juan Hortensio Quijano (Spanish pronunciation: [oɾˈtensjo kiˈxano]; June 10, 1884 – April 3, 1952) was the Vice President of Argentina under President Juan Perón from 1946 until his 1952 death in Buenos Aires.

Quijano was born in Corrientes Province in 1884, and enrolled at the University of Buenos Aires, where he graduated in 1908 and received a juris doctor in 1919. He became a prominent Corrientes Province supporter of the leader of the reformist UCR, Hipólito Yrigoyen, at a time when local politics were dominated by the Autonomist and Liberal parties. His 1918 UCR candidacy for the Corrientes governorship was defeated, and he joined the legal department of the Banco de la Nación Argentina (the country's largest bank).

Quijano broke with Yrigoyen's wing of the UCR and joined the opposition "Anti-Personalist" UCR. He left a thriving law practice in Corrientes in 1920 to invest in a logging venture in neighboring Chaco Province, and was named head of the Rural Society of Resistencia (Chaco), in 1936. He also parlayed his returns into the establishment of the Banco Popular.

The coup d'état of 1943 led to the advent of a populist leader, Col. Juan Perón, whose labor law reform platform Quijano and others in the UCR supported. This support helped lead to Quijano's August 4, 1945 appointment as Interior Minister, a powerful position in Argentina at the time for its oversight of law enforcement. Perón's success in an October 17 power struggle led to Quijano's establishment of the "Renewal Group," a faction of the UCR endorsing Perón for the upcoming February 1946 elections. These efforts earned Quijano Perón's invitation as his running mate on the Labor Party ticket, which was comfortably elected.

As Vice President, Quijano earned plaudits for his negotiations with neighboring Brazil, resulting in a temporary reintroduction of the ABC Pact that had included the two nations and Chile, earlier in the 20th century. Failing health, however, had forced Quijano to request his exclusion from the 1951 Perón ticket. His prospective replacement, First Lady Eva Perón, was in similarly poor health and, after she pleaded with him personally, he reluctantly agreed to join the Peronist ticket. Elected overwhelmingly in November 1951, Quijano died in early April, before being re-inaugurated. At the inauguration two months later, Evita, who had been given the title Spiritual Chief of the Argentine Nation but was herself soon to die as well, took his place.

In the 1996 film Evita, he was played by Brian Cobby.

Political offices
Preceded by Juan Pistarini	Vice President of Argentina; 1946–1952	Succeeded by Alberto Teisaire
Preceded by None (1946); Eva Perón (1951)	Peronist Party nominee for Vice President of Argentina and President of the Argentine Senate; 1946 (won); 1951 (won)	Succeeded by Alberto Teisaire
