= FDO =

FDO may refer to:

== Organizations ==
- Federación Deportiva Obrera, the Workers Sport Federation, a defunct Argentine sporting organization
- freedesktop.org, a free software project
- Family Dollar (NYSE: FDO), an American variety store chain

== Other uses ==
- Feedback-directed optimization, a compiler optimization
- Flight Dynamics Officer, personnel who aid space flight
- "FDO" (song), song by Pooh Shiesty
