= Independent Party (Argentina) =

Independent Party Partido Independiente
- Leader: Alberto Teisaire
- Founded: 17 October 1945
- Dissolved: 1947
- Preceded by: Independent Socialist Party; National Democratic Party
- Succeeded by: Peronist Party
- Ideology: Peronism; Paternalistic conservatism
- Political position: Centre-right

The Independent Party (Spanish: Partido Independiente) was a short-lived Peronist political party in Argentina. It was founded in 1945, ahead of the 1946 general election, to support the candidacy of General Juan Perón to the presidency. It was founded by Rear Admiral Alberto Teisaire, who was later elected as Vice President of Argentina.

The Independent Party was one of three political parties backing Perón's 1946 candidacy, alongside the Labour Party and the Junta Renovadora Radical Civic Union (a faction of the Radical Civic Union). With 56% of the vote, Perón was victorious and became president of Argentina. The three political parties delegated their joint coordination to a "National Board of Political Coordination", presided by Juan Atilio Bramuglia. It was initially decided the three parties would coexist as part of the governing coalition, with the Labour Party (to which Perón belonged) as senior coalition partner.

In 1947, Perón decided to dissolve the three parties into a single, unified governing party, initially known as the "Unified Party of the Revolution", and later known as the Peronist Party.
