= 1960 Argentine legislative election =

- 27 March 1960
- 102 of the 192 seats in the Chamber of Deputies
- Turnout: 86.90%
Party	Vote %	Seats	+/–
People's Radical Civic Union	31.76	52	+24
Intransigent Radical Civic Union	27.22	46	−22
National Federation of Centre Parties	12.87	3	+2
Provincial Defence–White Flag	0.72	1	+1
This lists parties that won seats. See the complete results below.
Results by province

Legislative elections were held in Argentina on 27 March. Voters chose their legislators, and with a turnout of 87%.

== Background ==
President Arturo Frondizi had been elected in 1958 largely with the endorsement of the exiled, populist leader, Juan Perón. Military and conservative pressure made the president unable to lift the 1955 ban imposed on Peronism - though Peronists had other reasons for breaking with Frondizi ahead of the 1960 elections. Contrary to his platform, he appointed ultra-conservative economist Alvaro Alsogaray, whose austerity program helped lead to a doubling of prices in 1959 (a record, up to that time) and sharp recession. Recommending the casting of blank votes, Perón took care to deprive Frondizi of potential anti-peronist support by revealing their earlier, secret deal: Peronist support in 1958 in exchange for restored political rights. A year marked with labor strife was followed by the bombing of a Shell Petroleum facility in March 1960, leading to the enactment of the Conintes Plan - a further, severe limitation on political freedoms.

Frondizi bore the brunt of public disapproval over these developments; in reality, however, both decisions were signed on the insistence of the Argentine military, many of whom were unambiguous on their willingness to overthrow the president (Conintes, in particular was signed in lieu of military demands for martial law). Frondizi's UCRI congressional candidates went from nearly half the 1958 vote to only 27% - though they retained their overall majority since its loss of seats was more moderate (mostly to Ricardo Balbín's more conservative UCR-P). Peronists' blank votes resulted in one of the highest such incidences (25%) in Argentine electoral history.

== Results ==
Party	Votes	%	Seats	
Party	Votes	%	Won	Total
People's Radical Civic Union	2,091,703	31.76	52	76
Intransigent Radical Civic Union	1,792,496	27.22	46	111
National Federation of Centre Parties (PD–PLCo–PACo)	847,210	12.87	3	4
Argentine Socialist Party	352,960	5.36	0	0
Christian Democratic Party	338,392	5.14	0	0
Democratic Socialist Party	313,227	4.76	0	0
Democratic Progressive Party	241,611	3.67	0	0
Labour Party	81,534	1.24	0	0
People's Party	74,661	1.13	0	0
Socialist Party	74,019	1.12	0	0
Property Owners Union	65,442	0.99	0	0
Provincial Defence–White Flag	47,319	0.72	1	1
Workers' Party	38,435	0.58	0	0
Republican Union	36,954	0.56	0	0
White Party	35,216	0.53	0	0
Federal Union	30,350	0.46	0	0
Principist Radical Civic Union	26,053	0.40	0	0
Communist Party of Argentina	20,145	0.31	0	0
Labour Gathering Party	9,098	0.14	0	0
Red and White Intransigent Radical Civic Union	8,625	0.13	0	0
Progressive Action	7,466	0.11	0	0
Authentic Radical Civic Union	6,909	0.10	0	0
Christian Democratic People's Union	6,623	0.10	0	0
Popular Liberation	6,257	0.10	0	0
Agrarian Social Party	6,124	0.09	0	0
Antipersonalist Radical Civic Union	5,944	0.09	0	0
Independent Civic Party	5,314	0.08	0	0
Popular Intransigent Radical Civic Union	4,469	0.07	0	0
Salta National Liberation Party	2,891	0.04	0	0
Formosa Civic Union	2,577	0.04	0	0
Federal Agrarian Labour Party	2,022	0.03	0	0
Agrarian Labour Party	1,223	0.02	0	0
Radical Recovery Movement	1,119	0.02	0	0
Radical Civic Union – Core Unity	913	0.01	0	0
Total	6,585,301	100.00	102	192
Valid votes	6,585,301	74.86		
Invalid/blank votes	2,211,244	25.14		
Total votes	8,796,545	100.00		
Registered voters/turnout	10,122,800	86.90		
Source: Cantón, Ministry of the Interior, Nohlen

=== Results by province ===
Province	UCRP			UCRI			Center Parties			Others		
Province	Votes	%	Seats	Votes	%	Seats	Votes	%	Seats	Votes	%	Seats
Buenos Aires	753,702	34.55	18	507,283	23.25	8	272,574	12.49	0	648,220	29.71	0
Buenos Aires City	371,530	29.00	13	307,145	23.98	5	79,307	6.19	0	523,101	40.83	0
Catamarca	18,980	35.83	2	18,477	34.88	0	7,054	13.32	0	8,462	15.97	0
Chaco	49,688	37.10	2	46,075	34.40	1	9,341	6.97	0	28,836	21.53	0
Chubut	9,715	30.69	0	11,971	37.82	1	2,444	7.72	0	7,526	23.77	0
Córdoba	294,251	44.33	6	189,458	28.54	3	102,019	15.37	0	78,046	11.76	0
Corrientes	12,042	6.19	0	63,251	32.52	2	104,624	53.79	1	14,586	7.50	0
Entre Ríos	111,882	37.71	5	87,642	29.54	2	56,779	19.14	0	40,412	13.62	0
Formosa	12,763	38.56	0	12,949	39.12	2	—	—	—	7,386	22.32	0
La Rioja	17,100	41.19	0	17,395	41.90	2	5,015	12.08	0	2,002	4.82	0
Mendoza	66,199	23.92	1	60,813	21.97	0	101,909	36.82	2	47,846	17.29	0
Misiones	28,173	38.15	1	30,204	40.90	2	3,107	4.21	0	12,373	16.75	0
Neuquén	7,081	28.97	0	7,523	30.77	1	2,177	8.91	0	7,665	31.35	0
Salta	27,395	27.95	0	31,475	32.11	1	25,119	25.62	0	14,041	14.32	0
San Luis	5,925	9.12	0	28,265	43.50	2	27,843	42.85	0	2,943	4.53	0
Santa Cruz	2,564	31.64	0	2,724	33.61	2	1,130	13.94	0	1,686	20.80	0
Santa Fe	218,421	28.80	3	235,370	31.03	7	25,236	3.33	0	279,380	36.84	0
Santiago del Estero	47,876	33.98	1	60,906	43.23	2	7,505	5.33	0	24,608	17.47	0
Tucumán	36,416	15.92	0	73,570	32.16	3	14,027	6.13	0	104,773	45.80	1
Total	2,091,703	31.76	52	1,792,496	27.22	46	847,210	12.87	3	1,853,892	28.15	1
