= 1946 Argentine general election =

- Presidential election
- 24 February 1946

376 members of the Electoral College 189 votes needed to win
- Registered: 3,477,169
- Turnout: 81.21%
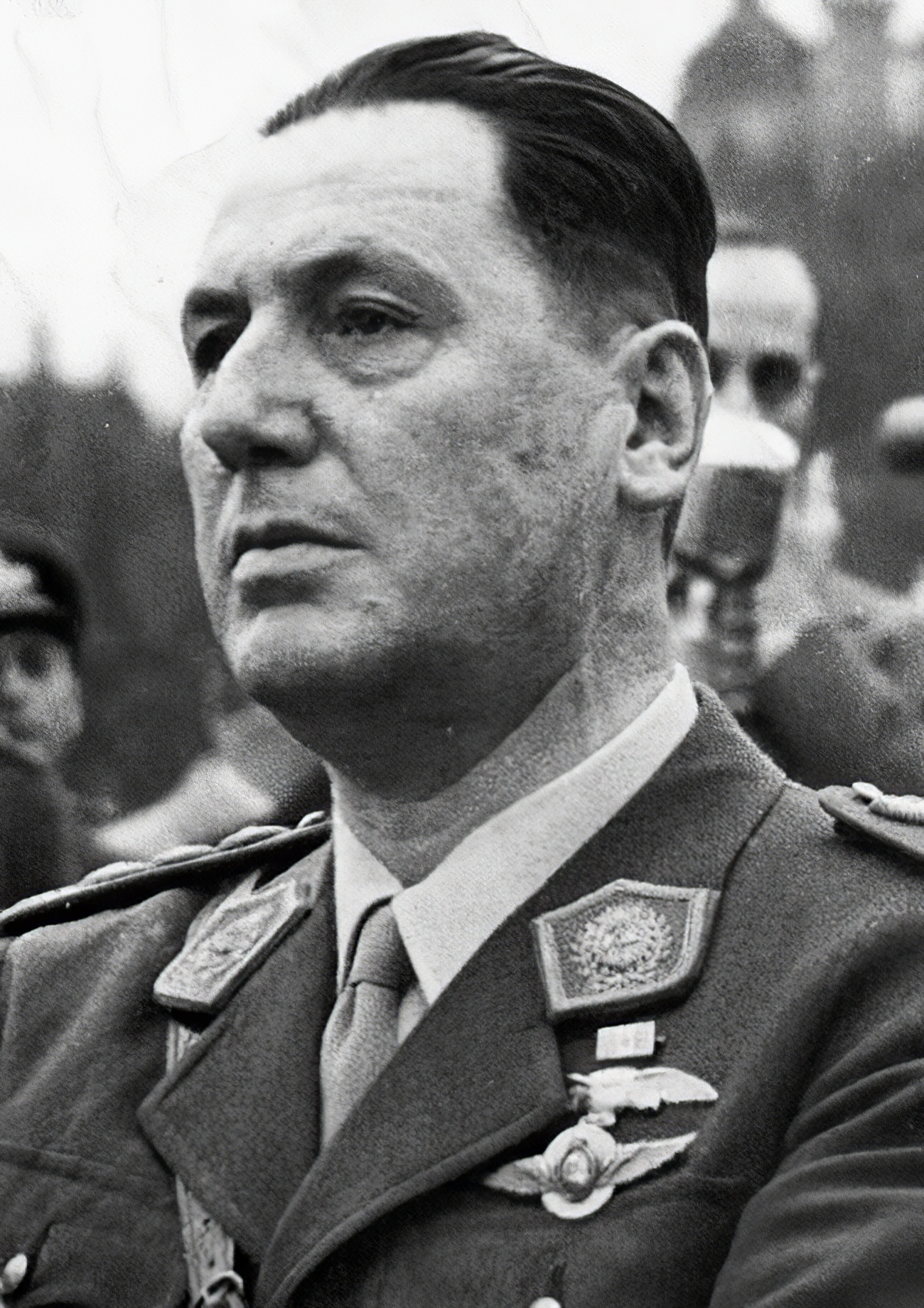

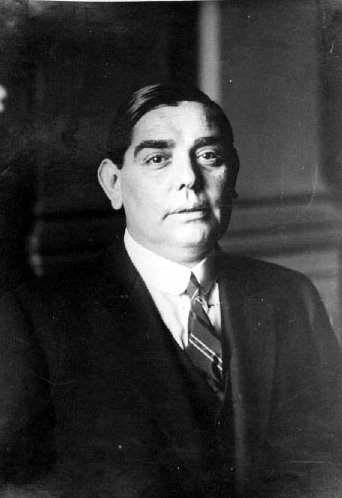
Candidate	Juan Perón	José Tamborini
Party	Labour Party	UCR
Alliance	JNCP	Democratic Union
Running mate	Hortensio Quijano	Enrique Mosca
Electoral vote	304	72
Popular vote	1,485,468	1,262,630
Percentage	53.71%	45.65%
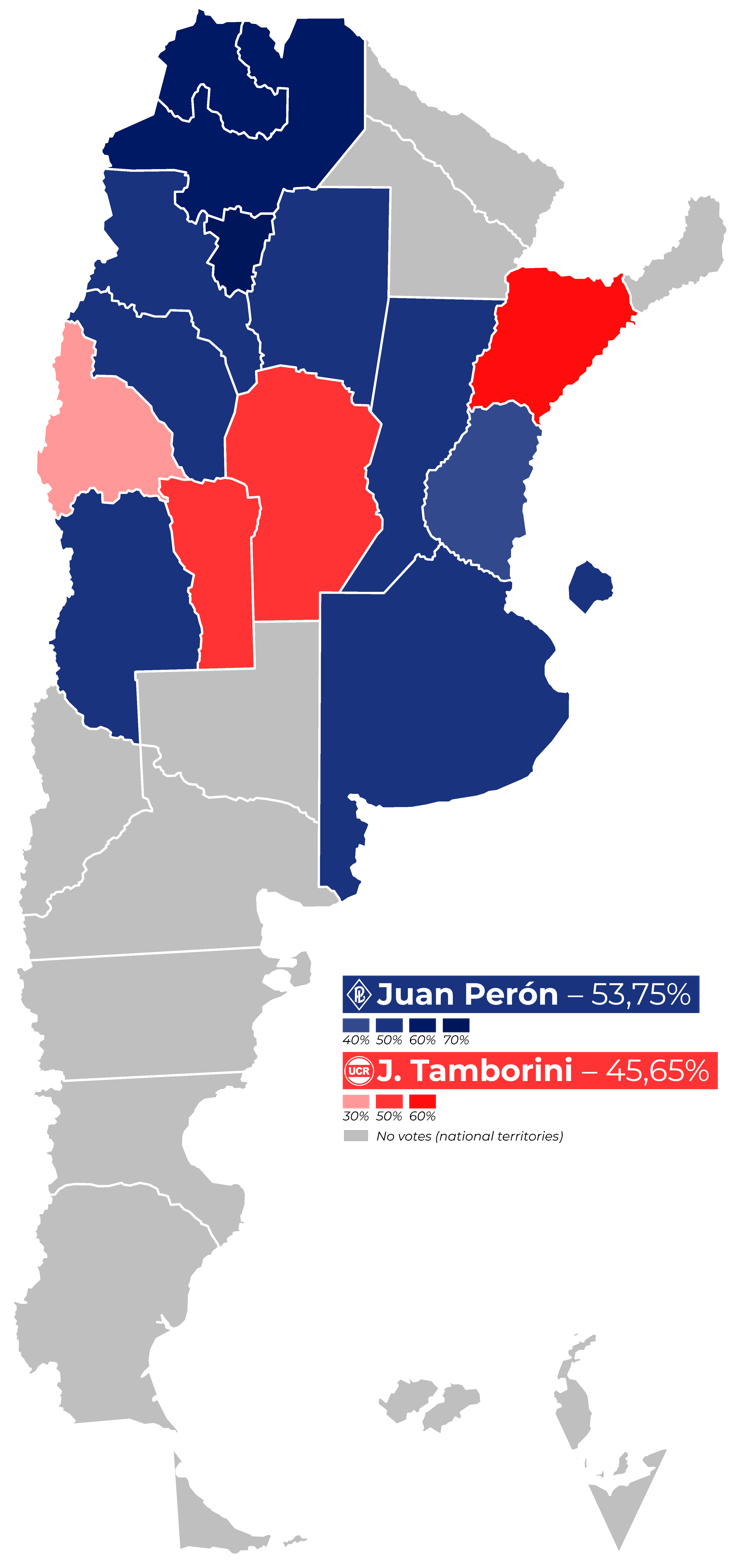
- Perón (255): 30%–39% (4) 40%–49% (7) 50%–59% (123) 60%–69% (93) 70%–79% (21) 80%–89% (6) 90%–99% (2) Tamborini (160): 40%–49% (9) 50%–59% (88) 60%–69% (36) 70%–79% (12) 80%–89% (15) UCR Bloquista (3): 30%–39% (1) 40%–49% (2)
President of Argentina before election
Edelmiro Julián Farrell
Elected President
Juan Perón
Labour Party
- Legislative election
- 24 February 1946
- All 158 seats in the Chamber of Deputies; 80 seats needed for a majority
- Turnout: 82.25%
Party	Vote %	Seats
National Board of Political Coordination	51.19	109
Radical Civic Union	27.23	44
National Democratic Party	7.64	3
Democratic Progressive Party	2.55	1
Blockist Radical Civic Union	0.49	1
This lists parties that won seats. See the complete results below.
Results by province
President of the Chamber of Deputies after
Ricardo Guardo; UCR-JR

General elections were held in Argentina on 24 February 1946. They were the last for which only men were enfranchised. Voters chose both the president and their legislators.

== Background ==
Conservative rule, maintained through electoral fraud despite a moderate record, was brought to an end in a June 1943 coup d'état. Broadcasting "orders of the day" every morning on the radio, the new regime enjoyed little approval. The devastating 1944 San Juan earthquake presented an opportunity to regain lost goodwill and the regime moved quickly, involving the private sector through nationwide fund-raising, entrusted to the Labor Minister, Juan Perón. Perón enlisted celebrities for the effort, among which was a radio matinee star, Eva Duarte, who introduced herself to the Labor Minister by remarking that "nothing's missing, except a touch of Atkinson's". The effort's success and the rise of his ally, Edelmiro Farrell, within the junta, led to Perón's appointment as vice-president, which he leveraged in support of Argentina's struggling labor unions, particularly the CGT.

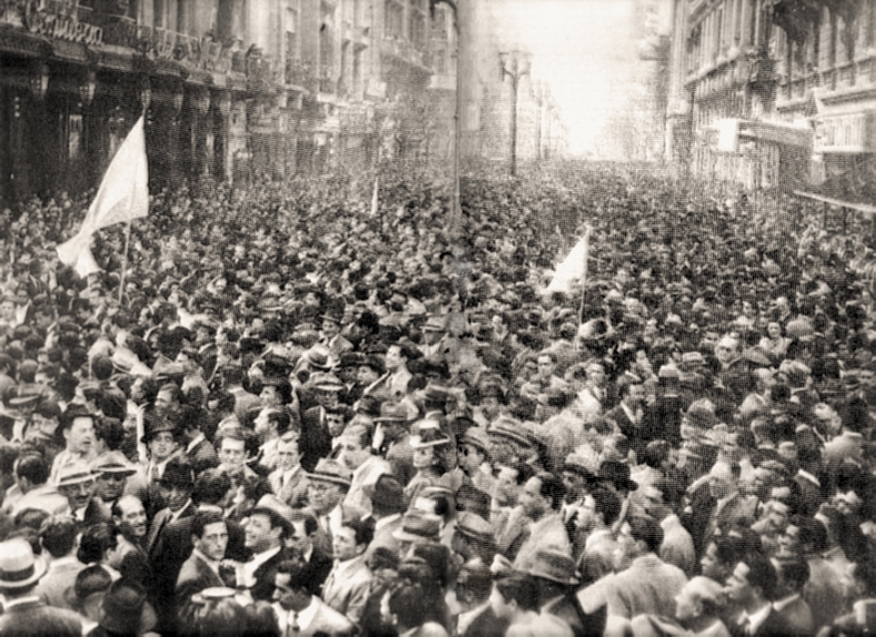
Supporters of the Democratic Union gather on May Avenue in Buenos Aires. This 1945 alliance of conservatives and leftists was tenuously united only by its opposition to Perón.

Perón's sudden clout led to growing rivalry among his junta colleagues, who had him arrested on October 9, a surprise move outdone by CGT leaders like retail workers' leader Ángel Borlenghi, the slaughterhouses' Cipriano Reyes, and Eva Duarte herself. Organizing a mass (and, at times, violent) demonstration for his release on the Plaza de Mayo, their October 17, 1945, mobilization marked a turning point in Argentine history: the creation of the Peronist movement. Capitulating to the political winds, the junta bestowed presidential powers on Perón, who initiated his program of mass nationalizations of institutions such as the universities and Central Bank. Calling elections for February 1946, Perón's opposition hastily arranged an alliance, the Democratic Union. Many in the centrist Radical Civic Union were steadfastly opposed to this ad hoc union with conservatives and the left, an intrinsic burden compounded by a white paper scathingly critical of Perón released by the U.S. Ambassador, Spruille Braden. The report, accusing Perón of fascist ties, allowed him to marginalize the Democratic Union (and their nominees José Tamborini and Enrique Mosca – the "tambourine and the fly"). He quickly reframed the argument as one between "Perón or Braden", making this his rallying cry and winning the 1946 elections handily.

== Candidates for President ==
- Labor Party: Former Vice-president Juan Perón from Buenos Aires Province
- Democratic Union (UCR-led alliance): Former Congressman José Tamborini from the city of Buenos Aires
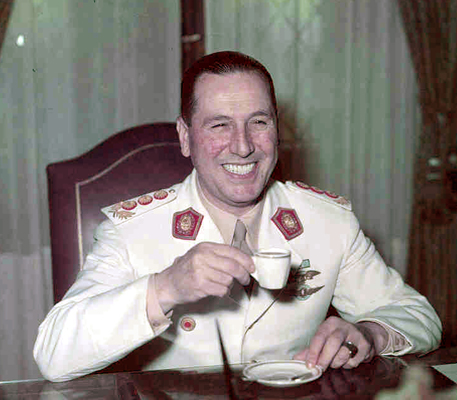
Perón

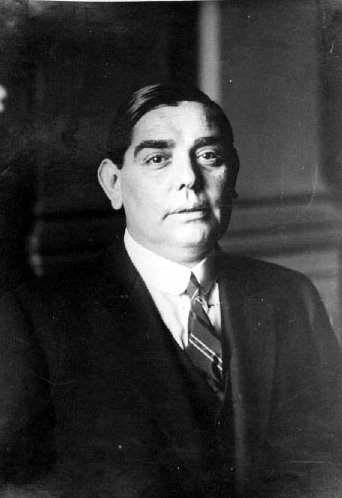
Tamborini

== Results ==
=== President ===
Candidate	Running mate	Party	Popular vote		Electoral vote	
Candidate	Running mate	Party	Votes	%	Votes	%
Juan Perón	Hortensio Quijano	National Board of Political Coordination (PL–UCR-JR–PI)	1,485,468	53.71	304	80.85
José Tamborini	Enrique Mosca	Democratic Union	1,207,178	43.65	72	19.15
No candidate	No candidate	National Democratic Party	43,499	1.57		
No candidate	No candidate	Blockist Radical Civic Union	13,469	0.49		
No candidate	No candidate	Santiago del Estero Radical Civic Union	12,362	0.45		
No candidate	No candidate	Lencinist Radical Civic Union	3,918	0.14		
Total			2,765,894	100.00	376	100.00
Valid votes			2,765,894	99.25		
Invalid votes			15	0.00		
Blank votes			20,831	0.75		
Total votes			2,786,740	100.00		
Registered voters/turnout			3,477,169	80.14		
Source: Chamber of Deputies, Amaral

=== Chamber of Deputies ===
Party	Votes	%	Seats		
Party	Votes	%	1946–1948	1946–1950	Total
National Board of Political Coordination (PL–UCR-JR–PI)	1,439,243	51.19	54	55	109
Radical Civic Union	765,620	27.23	22	22	44
National Democratic Party	214,894	7.64	2	1	3
Socialist Party	139,186	4.95	0	0	0
Democratic Progressive Party	71,731	2.55	1	0	1
Unity and Resistance (PC–PDP)	71,628	2.55	0	0	0
Communist Party of Argentina	41,470	1.48	0	0	0
Liberal Party of Corrientes	16,107	0.57	0	0	0
Blockist Radical Civic Union	13,696	0.49	0	1	1
Santiago del Estero Radical Civic Union	12,791	0.45	0	0	0
Santa Fe Radical Civic Union	6,328	0.23	0	0	0
Autonomist Party of Corrientes	5,811	0.21	0	0	0
Labour Gathering Party	4,241	0.15	0	0	0
Lencinist Radical Civic Union	4,040	0.14	0	0	0
Provincial Defence–White Flag	3,937	0.14	0	0	0
Public Health Party	605	0.02	0	0	0
Total	2,811,328	100.00	79	79	158
Valid votes	2,811,328	99.20			
Invalid votes	150	0.01			
Blank votes	22,525	0.79			
Total votes	2,834,003	100.00			
Registered voters/turnout	3,477,169	81.50			
Source: Chamber of Deputies, Amaral

==== Results by province ====
Province	Labour – UCR-JR – Indep.			Radical Civic Union			National Democratic			Others		
Province	Votes	%	Seats	Votes	%	Seats	Votes	%	Seats	Votes	%	Seats
Buenos Aires	440,419	54.93	28	260,342	32.47	14	50,815	6.34	0	50,269	6.27	0
Buenos Aires City	300,955	50.16	22	118,759	19.79	10	—	—	—	180,315	30.05	0
Catamarca	14,733	55.64	2	9,466	35.75	0	2,281	8.61	0	—	—	—
Córdoba	124,026	40.37	10	117,098	38.11	5	57,547	18.73	0	8,581	2.79	0
Corrientes	33,817	36.23	5	17,542	18.79	0	20,065	21.50	2	21,918	23.48	0
Entre Ríos	67,598	42.94	6	59,024	37.49	3	28,576	18.15	0	2,232	1.42	0
Jujuy	15,342	68.68	2	2,481	11.11	0	4,277	19.15	0	240	1.07	0
La Rioja	10,206	53.63	2	7,477	39.29	0	1,347	7.08	0	—	—	—
Mendoza	49,129	47.55	4	25,333	24.52	2	17,230	16.68	0	11,626	11.25	0
Salta	28,722	63.19	2	9,523	20.95	1	7,210	15.86	0	—	—	—
San Juan	15,970	33.28	2	7,281	15.17	0	9,821	20.46	0	14,920	31.09	1
San Luis	14,460	44.71	2	6,239	19.29	0	11,644	36.00	1	—	—	—
Santa Fe	194,792	56.51	13	71,872	20.85	5	—	—	—	78,059	22.64	1
Santiago del Estero	46,408	51.82	4	28,313	31.62	2	—	—	—	14,833	16.56	0
Tucumán	82,666	68.78	5	24,870	20.69	2	4,081	3.40	0	8,578	7.14	0
Total	1,439,243	51.19	109	765,620	27.23	44	214,894	7.64	3	391,571	13.93	2

=== Provincial governors ===
Election of Provincial governors
Elected: 14
Province	Elected	Party	Map
Buenos Aires	Domingo Mercante	Labour Party	
Catamarca	Pacífico Rodríguez	Labour Party	
Córdoba	Argentino Auchter	UCR – Junta Renovadora	
Corrientes	Blas Benjamín de la Vega	Unión Cívica Radical	
Entre Ríos	Héctor Domingo Maya	Labour Party	
Jujuy	Alberto Iturbe	UCR – Junta Renovadora	
La Rioja	José Francisco de la Vega	UCR – Junta Renovadora	
Mendoza	Faustino Picallo	UCR – Junta Renovadora	
Salta	Lucio Alfredo Cornejo Linares	UCR – Junta Renovadora	
San Juan	Juan Luis Alvarado	Labour Party	
San Luis	Ricardo Zavala Ortíz	UCR – Junta Renovadora	
Santa Fe	Waldino Suárez	Labour Party	
Santiago del Estero	Aristóbulo Mittelbach	Labour Party	
Tucumán	Carlos Domínguez	Labour Party	
