= Justicialist Party =

Political party in Argentina

Coordinates: 34°36′40.5″S 58°24′0.5″W

Justicialist Party Partido Justicialista
- Abbreviation: PJ
- President: Cristina Fernández de Kirchner
- Vice-President: José Mayans
- Senate leader: José Mayans (UP)
- Chamber leader: Germán Martínez (UP)
- Founders: Juan Perón; Eva Perón
- Founded: 21 July 1946; 80 years ago
- Merger of: Labour Party; UCR Renewal Board; Independent Party
- Headquarters: 130 Matheu Street; Buenos Aires
- Student wing: Peronist University Youth
- Membership (2024): ▲3,102,341
- Ideology: Peronism; Kirchnerism; Left-wing populism
- Political position: Centre-left to left-wing
- National affiliation: Homeland Force (majority)
- Continental affiliation: Christian Democrat Organization of America; São Paulo Forum; COPPPAL
- International affiliation: Centrist Democrat International (formerly); International Democracy Union (formerly)
- Colors: Light blue White
- Anthem: "Peronist March"
- Seats in the Senate: 25 / 72
- Seats in the Chamber of Deputies: 83 / 257
- Governors: 5 / 24

Flag

Website
- pj.org.ar
- Politics of Argentina; Political parties; Elections; A: The PJ has been described as catch-all, but mainly as centre-left, left-wing, or leftist. Peronism historically stretched from far-left to far-right views. The party is classified as centre-left or left-wing because of the dominating position of Kirchnerism; Steven Levitsky notes that under Kirchnerism, the party "shifted programmatically to the left". Additionally, Juan Perón, the founder of Peronism, is considered ideologically left-wing by Steve Ellner and Christopher Wylde.

The Justicialist Party (Spanish: Partido Justicialista [paɾˈtiðo xustisjaˈlista], PJ), also known as the Peronist Party (Spanish: Partido Peronista), is a major political party in Argentina, and the largest branch within Peronism.

Founded by Juan Perón and his wife, First Lady Eva Perón, the party followed a left-wing agenda based on his policies. It is overall the largest party in Congress. Historically, the party's factual position was undermined by divisions that emerged in the 1990s and lasted until 2020; the PJ was rocked by a conflict between two Peronist tendencies, Kirchnerism, the main, left-wing populist faction, and Federal Peronism, which was located on the centre and centre-right of the political spectrum. The division ended with the failure of Federal Peronism to challenge the dominating Kirchnerist faction in 2019. Federal Peronism no longer constitutes an internal party faction. The resulted from Cristina Kirchner’s election as leader of the party, and the creation of a separate dissident party: the Federal Consensus. Today, the party adheres to an ideology based on economic intervention, welfare-state policies, and economic independence from wealthier countries; it is located on the centre-left and left wing of the political spectrum.

Aside from Juan Perón, who governed Argentina on three occasions from 1946 to 1955 and later from 1973 to 1974, eleven presidents of Argentina have belonged to the Justicialist Party: Héctor Cámpora, Raúl Alberto Lastiri, Isabel Perón, Carlos Menem, Ramón Puerta, Adolfo Rodríguez Saá, Eduardo Camaño, Eduardo Duhalde, Néstor Kirchner, Cristina Fernández de Kirchner and Alberto Fernández. Justicialists have been the largest party in Congress almost consistently since 1987.

== History ==
=== Overview ===
The Justicialist Party was founded in 1946 by Juan and Eva Perón, uniting the Labour Party, the Radical Civic Union Renewal Board and the Independent Party, the three parties that had supported Peron in the election. After the enactment of women's suffrage, the Female Peronist Party, led by the First Lady, was also established. All Peronist entities were banned from elections after 1955, when the Revolución Libertadora overthrew Perón, and civilian governments' attempt to lift Peronism's ban from legislative and local elections in 1962 and 1965 resulted in military coups.

Basing itself on the policies espoused by Perón as Argentine president, the party's platform has, from its inception, centered on populism, and its most consistent base of support has historically been the General Confederation of Labor, Argentina's largest trade union. Perón ordered the mass nationalization of public services, strategic industries, and the critical farm export sector; enacted progressive labor laws and social reforms; and accelerated public works investment.

His tenure also favored technical schools, harassed university staff, and promoted urbanization as it raised taxes on the agrarian sector. Those trends earned Peronism the loyalty of much of the working and lower classes but helped alienate the upper and middle classes of society. Censorship and repression intensified, and following his loss of support from the influential Argentine Catholic Church, Perón was ultimately deposed in a violent 1955 coup.

The alignment of groups as supporting or opposing Peronism has largely endured, but the policies of Peronism itself varied greatly over the subsequent decades, as did increasingly those put forth by its many competing figures. During Perón's exile, it became a big tent party united almost solely by its support for the aging leader's return. A series of violent incidents, as well as Perón's negotiations with both the military regime and diverse political factions, helped lead to his return to Argentina in 1973 and to his election in September that year.

An impasse followed in which the party had a place both for leftist armed organizations such as Montoneros, and far-right factions such as José López Rega's Argentine Anti-Communist Alliance. Following Perón's death in 1974, however, the tenuous understanding disintegrated, and a wave of political violence ensued, ultimately resulting in the March 1976 coup. The Dirty War of the late 1970s, which cost hundreds of Peronists (among thousands more) their lives, solidified the party's populist outlook, particularly following the failure of conservative Economy Minister José Alfredo Martínez de Hoz's free trade and deregulatory policies after 1980.

In the first democratic elections after the end of the dictatorship of the National Reorganization Process, in 1983, the Justicialist Party lost to the Radical Civic Union (UCR). Six years later, it returned to power with Carlos Menem, during whose term the Constitution was reformed to allow for presidential reelection. Menem (1989–1999) adopted neoliberal right-wing policies which changed the overall image of the party.

The Justicialist Party was defeated by a coalition formed by the UCR and the centre-left FrePaSo (itself a left-wing offshoot of the PJ) in 1999, but regained political weight in the 2001 legislative elections, and was ultimately left in charge of managing the selection of an interim president after the economic collapse of December 2001. Justicialist Eduardo Duhalde, chosen by Congress, ruled during 2002 and part of 2003.

The 2003 elections saw the constituency of the party split in three, as Carlos Menem, Néstor Kirchner (backed by Duhalde) and Adolfo Rodríguez Saá ran for the presidency leading different party coalitions. After Kirchner's victory, the party started to align behind his leadership, moving slightly to the left.

The Justicialist Party effectively broke apart in the 2005 legislative elections when two factions ran for a Senate seat in Buenos Aires Province: Cristina Fernández de Kirchner (then the First Lady) and Hilda González de Duhalde (wife of former president Duhalde). The campaign was particularly vicious. Kirchner's side allied with other minor forces and presented itself as a heterodox, left-leaning Front for Victory (FpV), while Duhalde's side stuck to older Peronist tradition. González de Duhalde's defeat to her opponent marked, according to many political analysts, the end to Duhalde's dominance over the province, and was followed by a steady defection of his supporters to the winner's side.

Néstor Kirchner proposed the entry of the party into the Socialist International in February 2008. His dominance of the party was undermined, however, by the 2008 Argentine government conflict with the agricultural sector, when a bill raising export taxes was introduced with presidential support. Subsequent growers' lockouts helped result in the defection of numerous Peronists from the FpV caucus, and further losses during the 2009 mid-term elections resulted in the loss of the FpV absolute majorities in both houses of Congress.

In 2015, the PJ, with its presidential candidate Daniel Scioli, was defeated by the Cambiemos coalition. Mauricio Macri was inaugurated as President of Argentina, ending 12 years of Kirchnerism.

However, in the elections of 2019, the PJ joined the Frente de Todos, which won the presidential elections. The PJ returned to power, with Alberto Fernández as President of the nation. On 10 December 2019, the Centre-left Alberto Fernández of the Justicialist Party was inaugurated president, after defeating the incumbent Mauricio Macri in the 2019 Argentine general election.

The success of the party in the 2019 elections was juxtaposed with the failure of dissident Federal Peronists to challenge the Kirchnerist majority within the party. The Federal Peronists failed to distinguish themselves from anti-Peronist movements, and their bid to put up its own electoral lists to compete with Kirchnerists failed. The election resulted in a "dismantling of the Federal Peronism alternative".

On 22 March 2021, Fernández was elected by the national congress of the Justicialist Party as the party's new national chairman, succeeding José Luis Gioja. Fernández ran unopposed, heading the Unidad y Federalismo list, which received the support of diverse sectors in the Peronist movement, including La Cámpora.

The Union for the Homeland (Unión por la Patria, UP) is a centre-left to left-wing political and electoral coalition of Peronist political parties in Argentina, formed to compete in the 2023 general election. The coalition is a successor to the previous Frente de Todos coalition. The coalition is centered on the Justicialist Party and its allies both on the federal and provincial levels, including the Renewal Front of Sergio Massa.

In April 2023, President Alberto Fernandez announced that he would not seek re-election in the next presidential election. In the primary elections on August of that year, Sergio Massa defeated Juan Grabois by a margin of nearly 16 percentage points, although it became the worst result for a ruling Peronist coalition since the PASO was first implemented in 2009.

In the runoff in November 2023, Libertarian candidate Javier Milei defeated Massa with 55.7% against 44.35% of the vote, the highest percentage of the vote since Argentina's transition to democracy. Massa conceded defeat shortly before the official results were published.

=== Beginning ===
The Justicialist party was created in November 1946, 10 months after Juan D. Perón was elected president of the nation, with the name Single Revolutionary party; previously this would be called the Peronist party. The party was a result of the fusion of three parties that had been created in 1945 in order to sustain the presidential candidacy of Perón: the Labor party, the Radical Renovating Together Civic Union, and the Independent party.

=== Peronism ===
Peronism is a political current that was established between November 1943 and October 1945, as a result of an alliance between a large number of unions, principally of socialist and revolutionary union ideology, and two soldiers – Juan Domingo Perón and Domingo Mercante, whose initial objective was to run the National Labor Department – later elevated to the level of Secretary of Labor and Social Security – and to drive until there were laws and measures for the worker's benefit. The Secretary was run by Perón, who in the course of those years was converted into the leader of a new political movement that would take the name Peronism in the course of 1945.

Since 1943, the country was governed by a military dictatorship self-designated as the Revolution of ‘43, made of a very heterogeneous composition, that had overthrown at its time a fraudulent regime, known as the Infamous Decade. At the start of 1945, the US ambassador to Argentina, Spruille Braden, organized a broad movement that was defined as anti-peronist, with the goal of opposing Perón and the sanctioned labor laws. Largely as a reaction to the union movement, principally the socialist and revolutionary union majority started to define themselves as peronists.

On 8 October 1945, at the loss of the vote from the officials of Campo de Mayo, Perón renounced, being later detained. Nine days later, a big worker mobilization known as Loyalty Day, compelled the military government to prepare Perón's liberation and call elections. That day is the most cited as the date of peronism's birth.

=== Party Organization until 1955 ===
Many union leaders opposed him, but their political inexperience and Perón's charisma before the masses made them unsuccessful. Lewinsky characterizes the Peronist party (PP) as a popular party that will differ from other European, union based parties in four aspects.

The first of them is that they had been created from above by agents of the State, destined to retain power more than to obtain it; operated in major part by their own government using State resources whereas PP never developed their own organization. The second is that they were an extremely personalist party that in the statutes of 1954 declared Perón is their “Supreme Leader” and gave him the authority to “modify or declare null and void the decision of the party authorities... to inspect, intervene, and replace” the leaders of the party and even prohibited party headquarters from displaying photographs that were not Perón or Eva Perón. The national party management intervened in permanent form in the provincial subsidiaries and used to choose the local candidates. Usually the leaders with independent support were displaced and replaced by those “loyal to the death” that followed Perón's directives exclusively. In this form, the political career inside the party depended exclusively on the bonds with Perón; there was not a structure for political promotion nor a stable bureaucratic hierarchy. For example, the reorganization of the party in 1947 signified the replacement of the entirety of the highest party leadership members.

Third, the party had a fluid structure that was maintained until the final days of the decade of 1940. In 1951, Perón once again reorganized the party structure creating a parallel hierarchy with a “strategic national command” and provincial “tactical commands” that would have representatives of the three party branches – masculine, feminine, and union – but in practice Perón and Eva Perón exercised strategic leadership, and the governors and “inventors” arrived ahead of the tactics. Lastly, differently from the English Labor party, the PP did not initially have rules about their relation with the unions. In the decade of 1950, the union was recognized as one of the three branches and, as such, was attributed to them by tradition – without a written norm – a right to a third of the candidacies, but until 1955 it was not complied with rigor.

== Ideology ==
Political alignment of Argentine parties by political scientist Carlos Gervasoni. The Justicialist Party is coded as PJ, and occupies the left-populist dimension.

The Justicialist Party is a left-wing populist party, which is also its historical alignment. According to Mariano Dagatti, "In its origins, its main commitment was the aid of workers and it remained since then closely linked to the working classes and labour unions." In the Historical Dictionary of Argentina, Bernardo A. Duggan and Colin M. Lewis stated that the party "remains solidly rooted in the urban working class and organized elements of rural labor" and that "almost exclusively, it has been responsible for the incorporation of the working class within the political system, despite a questionable commitment to democratic politics." Political scientist Benjamin Shafer Raderstorf wrote:

Unlike clientelist parties in the US and Britain, the Peronists are not a multi-class coalition, and are instead almost exclusively a lower-class party, competing against middle and upper class-backed coalitions. In fact—as Pierre Ostiguy notes—class, not ideology, defines electoral coalitions in Argentina, almost without fail. For the PJ to pursue a middle-class centered electoral strategy would be totally unprecedented and against the entire political foundation of the party.

Founded by Juan Perón (who rose to Argentinian presidency in the 1940s with the support of his wife Eva Perón), the party was composed of Perón's loyalists and was a personification of populism in the form of a strong charismatic leader. The reforms carried out by Perón in 1940s and 1950s were described as socialist and populist. Christopher Wylde defines Peronism as "a form of leftist–populist nationalism, rooted in an urban working-class movement that was allied to elements of the domestic bourgeoisie as well as the military." Writing on Perón and his ideology, Charles D. Ameringer argued that "The rise to power of Juan Perón in 1943 was not the end of the socialist impulse in Argentina; it was the culmination" and added that "much of the social legislation either introduced or implemented by Perón. .. originated with the Socialist Party."

=== Economic policy ===
The modern Justicialist Party is described as economically nationalist, working class-oriented, and as a "blend of nationalism and labourism". It has a strong focus on state intervention in economy and social security. According to Yasmin Mertehikian and Emilio Parrado, party's policies give the state a predominant role in the economy; PJ pursues market regulation, expansion of public sector, protecting employment and vulnerable worker groups, along with government subsidies for unemployed or low-income workers. The Economist wrote that the party pursues "near-autarky, and extended welfare benefits". Its policies are also considered protectionist and redistributionist. Greg Mills wrote that the PJ focuses on elimination of poverty as its main economic goal, and summed up its traditional policy as "interventions in markets, the nationalisation of companies [and] widespread price and exchange controls". Axel Kicillof, the party's Minister of the Economy during Cristina Kirchner's presidency, argued that the advancement of technology now allows it "to centrally manage the economy now Soviet style". The party also pursues reduced dependence on foreign credit, and since the emergence of Kirchnerism, its platform has been described as left-wing populist and anti-neoliberal.

The basic principles of Peronism and the Justicialist Party are economic independence, political sovereignty, and social justice, as formulated by Perón. Economically, Perón expanded public spending and gave the state a dominating role in production and distribution (economic nationalism), implemented egalitarian distribution of national income (therefore Peronism is considered to represent syndicalism and/or non-Marxist socialism), and implemented a system of incentives and rewards that would direct economic activities towards local markets while severely limiting production for international markets (protectionism). Peronism rejected individualism in favor of communitarianism and sought rejected capitalism in favor of an economic system that would be oriented around "social equity, rather than the individual pursuit of wealth." This was combined with Peronist redefinition of citizenship, as Perón attracted and empowered groups that were previously excluded socially and economically - urban poor, immigrant communities and unionised workers.

=== Social policy ===
Socially, Peronism was authoritarian, yet it also implemented free suffrage and promoted causes such as feminism, indigenous rights and emancipation of the working class. Peter Ranis wrote that "paradoxically, Perón democratized Argentina in the sense of bringing the working class more fully into the political process, though his administrations often placed cultural and political restrictions on the opposition that severely compromised that democracy." The legitimacy of Peronism derived from trade unions who gave Perón their support, and his ideology was a reflection of demands and expectations of the Argentinian labor movement. According to historian Daniel James, the reliance of Peronism on trade unions was so strong, that in the Peronist movement, "the initiative very much lay with the trade union movement; Perón was more its creature than the labor movement was his."

Modern Justicialist Party is divided on social issues - it traditionally defends the Catholic social doctrine, and is the most popular party in pro-life districts. On the other hand, Cristina Kirchner's social agenda has been described as very progressive. According to political scientists Ana Carolina Garriga and Juan Negri, most Peronist leaders oppose abortion, but refrain from campaigning on it to maintain the party's capacity to represent various sectors of Argentine society. At the same time, the Journal of Populism Studies described the party as "anti-feminist, anti-LGBT, nationalist". Cristina Kirchner initially abortion, stating: "I am not progre, I am Peronist... Furthermore, I am against abortion".

Despite this, Peronist governments backed progressive legislation. Same-sex marriage was legalized during the presidency of Cristina Fernández de Kirchner, and under the leadership of Alberto Fernández, the party signed into law bills that legalized abortion up to the 14th week of pregnancy. Local enforcement of same-sex and abortion laws, especially in Peronist strongholds, has been lax. Peronist governments also pushed the advancement of transgender rights, with policies such as the Gender Identity Law, a 1% quota for trans people in public sector jobs, and the recognition of non-binary gender markers in national identity cards.

The party aligned closer to the Catholic Church following the election of Pope Francis, who expressed his support for Peronism; he remarked to President Kirchner: "It is the first time we have had a Peronist pope."

=== Foreign policy ===
In terms of foreign policy, the modern Justicialist Party has been described as nationalist, pro-China, supportive of Cuba and Venezuela, and hostile towards the IMF, Washington Consensus, and the United States. It asserts the Argentine claim to Falkland Islands, pressing for the recognition of Argentine sovereignty of the territory and considering it to illegally be occupied by the United Kingdom. The governments of the party have been described to have had "tense and hostile" relations with the USA, while deepening ties with countries such as Russia, Venezuela, Iran and Cuba. The party had friendly relations and was allied with Hugo Chávez, Fidel Castro, and Lula Da Silva.

The party has extensive ties and close relationship with the Chinese Communist Party (CCP), which dates back to Perón's presidency. Perón admired CCP chairman Mao Zedong, and stated that "if he had been Chinese he would be a Maoist". He had an epistolar relationship with Mao in the 1960s; the Chinese leader likewise expressed his sympathy for Perón, famously advising a delegation of Argentine communists to become Peronist in 1969, and stating: "If I were a young Argentinian, I would be a Peronist." The Justicialist Party gives China priority as the primary trade partner of Argentina. Writing on the party's relationship with Chinese authorities, Ricardo Ferrer Picado wrote:

On its part, the Peronist Party has a broad level of contact with the Chinese Communist Party. Political meetings are held between both parties – Juntos por el Cambio also held some – and there is a fluid exchange in diffferent levels of the Executive, Legislative, and Judicial Power between the two countries, which exceeds the political and also reaches public education – universities – with Chinese and Argentine delegations visiting both countries. […] Within this ever-closer bond, there have been some striking situations. For example, during his visit to Beijing in February 2022, Fernández told Xi Jinping in a meeting that if “he were Argentine, he would be a Peronist”, marking the ideological alignment that the Argentine president assumes exists between both parties, as did other Peronist leaders.

Justicialist Party is also an ally of Venezuela, and supported its presidents Hugo Chávez and Nicolás Maduro. Chávez felt strong ideological affinity with Néstor Kirchner and Juan Perón, and on a visit to Argentina, declared that he had read Perón's biography and "could indeed call himself a Peronist". Chávez's affinity towards Kirchnerist Argentina was such that Venezuela was the only country to buy Argentine bonds during the Argentine monetary crisis; this served to help Argentina recover from the recession, and was done by Chávez despite the fact that it was unfavourable to Venezuela itself. Argentina and Venezuela formed a strategic alliance that sought to "establish a new model of socio-economic development and bilateral integration with the purpose of reaching a South American autonomy." Both countries declared opposition to "Yankee imperialism", and Venezuela became the country that Argentina established the most international agreements with. Peronism became an important inspiration for Chávez and his ideology of Chavismo; Chávez called himself "a true Peronist". Maduro likewise declared : "I am a Peronist and an Evista." Members of the Justicialist Party were government-approved observers at the 2024 Venezuelan presidential election.

Since the rise of Kirchnerism, the Justicialist Party has had antagonistic relations with the IMF, denouncing it for imposing austerity measures and citing it as an example of US interventionism. Justicialist Party considers multilateral agreements as exploitative, arguing that they are designed to benefit wealthy countries. Michael Andrew Scanlaw wrote that the Justicialists "railed against the foreign interference of the IMF and World Bank via the Washington Consensus, articulating the same anti-colonial message as Perón before them." Under the party's rule, Argentina allied with Venezuela, Brazil and Bolivia to oppose the Washington consensus. The party also entered negotiations for Argentina to become a member of BRICS+ in 2023, and Argentina was to become a member on 1 January 2024. However, this was disrupted by the election of anti-Peronist Javier Milei in the 2023 Argentine general election, who formally rejected the invitation to BRICS+ upon taking office.

The party withheld condemning Russia after the Russian invasion of Ukraine. The Justicialist government opted to maintain friendly relations with Russia, and Alberto Fernández, the Argentine president and leader of the party at the time, argued that “Argentina must become the gate of access” for Russia. Party members were also observers at the 2024 Russian presidential election, invited by Russian authorities. In 2023, in response to the Gaza War, the Justicialist government criticized Israel for its actions in Gaza, accusing it of violating international law. The party itself released a statement accusing Israel of "indiscriminate killing in Gaza". As president, Cristina Kirchner became known for her hostile stance towards Israel. In a demonstration, the Popular Front for the Liberation of Palestine members carried a photo of Kircher next to Hugo Chávez, Ali Khamenei, Fidel Castro and Hasan Nasrallah, honouring them as "symbols of resistance against imperialism."

=== Development ===
Following the overthrow of Perón in 1955, Peronism would gradually shift further to the left, something that was influenced by political developments in Latin America such as the Cuban Revolution and the development of far-left liberation theology amongst Latin American Catholics, as well as by Perón's tactical endorsement and promotion of socialist and leftist currents within his movement. In 1956, exiled Perón picked left-wing activist John William Cooke to represent the Peronist movement in Argentina in his absence. Cooke promoted socialism and presented Peronism as a movement that was "antibureaucratic, socialist, profoundly national, and sister to all the world's exploited [peoples]", and praising Perón as the "leader of national liberation". In 1960, Cooke moved to Revolutionary Cuba, where he combined Peronism with Guevarism, Castroism and the foco theory.

Perón approved of Cooke's activism and wrote positively of Marxism himself, identifying Peronist struggle with the Cuban Revolution. With Perón's encouragement, Peronist youth formed left-wing, revolutionary organizations such as the Montoneros and the People's Revolutionary Army. Perón supported their struggle as a realisation of his justicialist doctrine, agreeing with the Montoneros' conclusion that "the only possible road for the people to seize power and install national socialism is total, national, and prolonged revolutionary war. .. [following] the methods of rural and urban guerrillas." Following Vatican II that led to development of anti-capitalist, revolutionary and Marxist-aligned rhetoric amongst Latin American clergy, Perón also gained support of left-wing Catholics who supported the far-left liberation theology. Left-wing priests praised Peronism as a precursor to liberation theology, and the Movement of Priests for the Third World argued that "the Peronist movement, revolutionary, with its massive force... will necessarily lead to the revolution which will make possible an original and Latin American socialism."

From the return of Perón in 1973 and under the leadership of Isabel Perón, the Justicialist Party was no longer characterized by anti-imperialist and revolutionary tones but by a strong focus on Orthodox Peronism and anti-communism (of which it became the main bulwark in South America). That line continued even after the military dictatorship of the National Reorganization Process, with the government of Carlos Menem until that of Eduardo Duhalde. The party moved from Orthodox Peronism to the centre-right, while its rival Radical Civic Union acted as a centre-left party. Later in the 20th century, it was described as a catch-all party. Since 2003, the party has undergone an abrupt revolution, with the rise of a faction known as the Front for Victory, led by Néstor Kirchner. The policies and ideology of that faction were dubbed Kirchnerism, a mix of anti-neoliberalism, left-wing nationalism and radicalism. Kirchner was elected President of Argentina and soon became a popular left-wing figure. The party shifted to being left-wing populist, while the Radical Civic Union joined with other anti-Kirchnerist centrist and center-right parties including Republican Proposal. After his death in 2010, his wife, Cristina Fernández de Kirchner, took over the leadership of the Front for Victory, which continues to be a major faction of the Justicialist Party.

== Leaders ==
The party is headed by a National Committee, whose president is the de facto leader of the party.

- 1946–1974: Juan Perón (President: 1946–1955, 1973–1974)
- 1974–1985: Isabel Perón (President: 1974–1976)
- 1985–1990: Antonio Cafiero
- 1990–2001: Carlos Menem (President: 1989–1999)
- 2001: Rubén Marín (interim)
- 2001–2003: Carlos Menem
- 2003–2004: Eduardo Fellner
- 2004–2005: (No leader)
- 2005–2008: Ramón Ruiz
- 2008–2009: Néstor Kirchner (President: 2003–2007)
- 2009: Daniel Scioli (interim)
- 2009–2010: Néstor Kirchner
- 2010–2014: Daniel Scioli (interim)
- 2016–2018: José Luis Gioja
- 2018: Luis Barrionuevo (judicial controller)
- 2018–2021: José Luis Gioja
- 2021–2024: Alberto Fernández (President: 2019–2023)
- 2024–: Cristina Fernández de Kirchner (President: 2007–2015)

== Electoral history ==
=== Presidential elections ===
Election year	Candidate(s)	First Round		Second Round		Result	Note
Election year	Candidate(s)	# votes	% vote	# votes	% vote	Result	Note
1951	Juan Perón	4,745,168	63.40			✓ Elected	as the Peronist Party
1958	no candidate (banned)					—	Perón-Frondizi Pact
1963	no candidate (banned)					—	
M-1973	Héctor Cámpora	5,907,464	49.56			✓ Elected	as the Justicialist Party part of the Justicialist Liberation Front
S-1973	Juan Perón	7,359,252	61.85			✓ Elected	part of the Justicialist Liberation Front
1983	Ítalo Lúder	5,944,402	40.16			✗ Defeated	247 Electoral College seats
1989	Carlos Menem	7,953,301	47.49			✓ Elected	325 Electoral College seats, part of the Popular Justicialist Front
1995	Carlos Menem	8,687,319	49.94			✓ Elected	Joint-ticket (PJ—UCeDé)
1999	Eduardo Duhalde	7,254,417	38.27			✗ Defeated	part of the Justicialist Coalition for Change
2003	Carlos Menem	4,740,907	24.45	null	0	✗ 2nd-R Forfeited	Front for Loyalty, a faction of PJ
2003	Néstor Kirchner	4,312,517	22.24	null	0	✓ 2nd-R Unopposed	Front for Victory, a faction of PJ
2003	Adolfo Rodríguez Saá	2,735,829	14.11			✗ 1st-R Defeated	Front of the Popular Movement, a faction of PJ
2007	Cristina Kirchner	8,651,066	45.29			✓ Elected	part of the Front for Victory Alliance
2007	Alberto Rodríguez Saá	1,458,955	7.64			✗ Defeated	part of the Justice, Union and Liberty Front Alliance
2011	Cristina Kirchner	11,865,055	54.11			✓ Elected	Front for Victory, a faction of PJ
2015	Daniel Scioli	9,338,449	37.08	12,198,441	48.60	✗ 2nd-R Defeated	part of the Front for Victory Alliance
2019	Alberto Fernández	12,473,709	48.10			✓ Elected	part of the Everyone's Front Alliance
2023	Sergio Massa	9,853,492	36.78	11,516,142	44.31	✗ 2nd-R Defeated	part of the Union for the Homeland
2023	Juan Schiaretti	1,802,068	6.73			✗ 1st-R Defeated	part of the Hacemos por Nuestro País

=== Congressional elections ===
==== Chamber of Deputies ====
Election year	votes	%	seats won	Total seats	Position	Presidency	Note
1948		64.1		109 / 158	Majority	Juan Perón (PP)	as the Peronist Party
1951		63.5		135 / 149	Majority	Juan Perón (PP)	as the Peronist Party
1954	4,977,586	62.96		161 / 173	Majority	Juan Perón (PJ)	as the Peronist Party
1958	null	0	0	0 / 187	Banned	Pedro Eugenio Aramburu (de facto)	
1960	null	0	0	0 / 192	Banned	Arturo Frondizi (UCRI)	
1962	1,592,446	17.53		23 / 192	Minority	Arturo Frondizi (UCRI)	as Unión Popular
1963				16 / 192	Minority	José María Guido (UCRI)	as Unión Popular and other pro-Justicialist
1965	2,833,528 (UP only)	29.6 (UP only)		52 / 192 (UP only)	Minority	Arturo Umberto Illia (UCRP)	as Unión Popular and other pro-Justicialist
1973	5,908,414	48.7		144 / 243	Majority	Alejandro Agustín Lanusse (de facto)	as Justicialist Party part of the Justicialist Liberation Front
1983	5,697,610	38.5	56 / 127	111 / 254	Minority	Reynaldo Bignone (de facto)	
1985	5,259,331	34.3	55 / 127	101 / 254	Minority	Raúl Alfonsín (UCR)	
1987	6,649,362	41.5	60 / 127	108 / 254	Minority	Raúl Alfonsín (UCR)	
1989	7,324,033	42.9	65 / 127	126 / 254	Minority	Raúl Alfonsín (UCR)	part of the Popular Justicialist Front
1991	6,288,222	40.2	62 / 127	116 / 257	Minority	Carlos Menem (PJ)	
1993	6,946,586	42.5	64 / 127	127 / 257	Minority	Carlos Menem (PJ)	
1995	7,294,828	43.0	68 / 127	131 / 257	Majority	Carlos Menem (PJ)	
1997	6,267,973	36.3	50 / 127	118 / 257	Minority	Carlos Menem (PJ)	
1999	5,986,674	32.3	51 / 127	101 / 257	Minority	Carlos Menem (PJ)	
2001	5,267,136	37.5	67 / 127	121 / 257	Minority	Fernando de la Rúa (UCR—Alianza)	
2003	5,511,420	35.1	62 / 127	129 / 257	Majority	Eduardo Duhalde (PJ)	as part of the FPV
2005	6,883,925	40.5	80 / 128	140 / 257	Majority	Néstor Kirchner (PJ-FPV)	as part of the FPV
2007	5,557,087	45.6	82 / 127	162 / 257	Majority	Néstor Kirchner (PJ-FPV)	as part of the FPV
2009	5,941,184	30.3	44 / 127	110 / 257	Minority	Cristina Kirchner (PJ-FPV)	as part of the FPV
2011	12,073,675	58.6	86 / 130	130 / 257	Majority	Cristina Kirchner (PJ-FPV)	as part of the FPV
2013	12,702,809	55.4	47 / 127	133 / 257	Majority	Cristina Kirchner (PJ-FPV)	as part of the FPV
2015	8,797,279	37.4	59 / 127	95 / 257	Minority	Cristina Kirchner (PJ-FPV)	as part of the FPV
2017	9,518,813	39.0	58 / 127	110 / 257	Minority	Mauricio Macri (PRO-Cambiemos)	as part of the Citizen's Unity
2019	11,359,508	45.5	64 / 127	122 / 257	Minority	Mauricio Macri (PRO-Cambiemos)	as part of the PDT
2021	8.041.290	34.56	50 / 127	118 / 257	Minority	Alberto Fernández (PJ-FDT)	as part of the PDT
2023	8.252.357	33.62	58 / 127	108 / 257	Minority	Alberto Fernández (PJ-FDT)	as part of the UxP

==== Senate elections ====
Election year	votes	%	seats won	Total seats	Position	Presidency	Note
2001	5,668,523	39.0	40 / 72	40 / 72	Majority	Fernando de la Rúa (UCR-Alianza)	
2003	1,852,456	40.7	18 / 24	41 / 72	Majority	Eduardo Duhalde (PJ)	as part of the FPV
2005	3,572,361	45.1	18 / 24	45 / 72	Majority	Néstor Kirchner (PJ-FPV)	as part of the FPV
2007	1,048,187	45.6	14 / 24	48 / 72	Majority	Néstor Kirchner (PJ-FPV)	as part of the FPV
2009	756,695	30.3	8 / 24	34 / 72	Minority	Cristina Kirchner (PJ-FPV)	as part of the FPV
2011	5,470,241	54.6	12 / 24	43 / 72	Majority	Cristina Kirchner (PJ-FPV)	as part of the FPV
2013	1,608,846	32.1	14 / 24	40 / 72	Majority	Cristina Kirchner (PJ-FPV)	as part of the FPV
2015	2,336,037	32.7	11 / 24	39 / 72	Majority	Cristina Kirchner (PJ-FPV)	as part of the FPV
2017	3,785,518	32.7	9 / 24	36 / 72	Minority	Mauricio Macri (PRO—Cambiemos)	as part of the Citizens' Unity
2019	2,609,017	46.30	13 / 24	39 / 72	Majority	Mauricio Macri (PRO—Cambiemos)	as part of the FDT
2021	2,122,648	29.83	9 / 24	35 / 72	Minority	Alberto Fernández (PJ—FDT)	as part of the FDT
2023	5,076,244	43.71	13 / 24	33 / 72	Minority	Alberto Fernández (PJ—FDT)	as part of the UxP
