= Meat Industry Workers Federation =

Trade union of meat workers in Argentina

FOIC
- Meat Industry Workers Federation
- Federación Obrera de la Industria de la Carne
- Dissolved: May 12, 1945
- Location: Argentina
- Key people: José Peter

The Meat Industry Workers Federation (in Spanish: Federación Obrera de la Industria de la Carne, abbreviated FOIC) was a trade union of meat workers in Argentina. The union was founded in the early 1930s. FOIC was led by the Communist Party of Argentina. José Peter was the general secretary of FOIC.

== 1932 strike ==
FIOC led a major strike in the Argentinian meat-packing industry in 1932. The strike began on May 20, 1932, and followed strikes in the tram workers' and farmers' strikes in March and April the same year. Although it only lasted for less than two weeks, it was the largest strike in the country since 1917–1918. The union shut down the largest meat-packing plant in the world, Anglo Frigorífico in Avellaneda. The strike spread to other meat-packing plants in Avellaneda and some workers also joined it in Berisso.

In preparations for the strike, the communists were able to benefit from their experiences with clandestine activism. As they were unable to hold large public meetings, they contacted workers and held small clandestine meetings with them. The meetings were camouflaged as picnics, festivals or other social gatherings.

At Anglo Frigorífico, 4,000 workers joined the strike. Around 3,000 workers participated in the daily mass meetings organized by FOIC and CUSC at Anglo Frigorífico. On May 21, 1931, FOIC mobilized a mass meeting at another meat-packing plant, La Blanca, with 2,500 participants. Violence erupted during the strike, and the Communist Party issued a call for workers' self-defense. On May 22, 1932, a meeting was held in Salon Verdi in La Boca. During this meeting, Peter called for continuation of the strike and condemned CGT and FORA for not having joined the strike.

However, the strike resulted in a failure for FOIC. The strike was met with repression, striking workers were assaulted by police forces. Police raided the FOIC headquarters and shut it down. In the industries, strikebreakers were brought in to substitute striking workers.

== Organizing profile ==
FOIC published El Obrero del Frigorífico.

Following the 1932 strike, FOIC readjusted some of its policies. It began to recognize the increasing importance of women workers in the meat-packing industries, and began to raise the demand for 'equal pay for equal work'. Moreover, with the emergence of Taylorist practices in the meat industry since the 1920s, FOIC demanded an end to piecework and premium system.

In 1935, the Communist Party adopted a more moderate approach to union organizing in the meat industry. FOIC worked on two fronts; on one hand it ran a national campaign (directed towards the Argentinian public opinion, government and CGT leadership) for improved conditions for meat workers, on the other FOIC began to organize informal social activities amongst meat-packing workers (such as picnics and barbecues).

In 1939 FOIC reached a formal deal with the CGT leadership (which was in the hands of moderate socialists), in which CGT agreed to prioritize organizing in the meat industry. Moreover, a petition, drafted by José Peter, was presented by the Socialist Party parliamentary faction in the Argentinian Chamber of Deputies, demanding improvements in the situation of meat-packing workers.

In 1942, after long negotiations, FOIC reached a deal with the meat-packing industry management regarding pensions for meat workers.

== Ban and resistance ==
One of the first moves of the military junta that seized power in June 1943, was the ban issued on FOIC. The FOIC offices in Berrios and Avellaneda were closed down. FOIC leaders, such as Peter, were arrested.

FOIC organized resistance to the new regime. FOIC cadres organized mass meetings in Rosario, Avellaneda and Berrios. They issued a strike petition, with both economic demands (such as demand for 30 hours guaranteed work per week) as well as a call for release of jailed labour leaders. The management refused to negotiate with the union. A major general strike was organized in September 1943. During the strike, many striking workers were attacked and arrested by police. However, the strike paralyzed the meat industry. Towards the end of the month, Peter and other FOIC leaders were released. The government agreed to recognize the right to union organizing, and FOIC called off the strike.

== Repressed, again ==
In October 1943, there was yet another clampdown on FOIC, yet more aggressive than the June 1943 crack-down. Negotiations with the management and government on meeting economic demands had failed. On October 22, 1943, the government raided the FOIC offices and the union leaders (including Peter) were jailed (Peter was deported to Uruguay after a year and half of imprisonment). The government ordered that the funds of FOIC was transferred to two persons that had been expelled from the organization. Following this crack-down, competition surged between the communists, independent unionists and Peronists over hegemony over the meat industry union movement. The latter two aligned themselves to corner the influence of FOIC.

== Dissolution ==
At a meeting held in the Eden del Dock Sur cinema on May 12, 1945, Peter declared that FOIC had been dissolved and encouraged the members and sympathizers of the union should join the autonomous unions in the meat industry. On September 1, 1946, CGT (now under Peronist leadership) accepted the transfer of the properties of FOIC from Peter.
