= Alcira de la Peña =

Argentine physician and political leader (1910–1998)

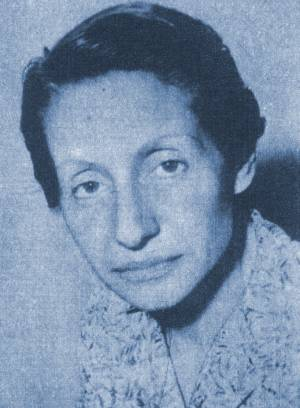
- Born: 8 November 1910; Buenos Aires, Argentina
- Died: 15 March 1998 (aged 87); Buenos Aires, Argentina
- Education: National University of Córdoba; University of Buenos Aires
- Occupations: Physician, politician
- Political party: Communist Party of Argentina

Alcira de la Peña (8 November 1910 – 15 March 1998) was an Argentine physician and political leader. She became an important figure within the country's communist, feminist, and human rights movements.

== Early years ==
Alcira de la Peña was born in Buenos Aires on 8 November 1910, the daughter of immigrants. Her father was the Spanish cereal producer Manuel de la Peña, and her mother, from a family of French freemasons, was Agustina Montrejeau. She had seven siblings. In 1918, the family moved to the city of Salto. Due to financial losses from the Great Depression, the children had to find jobs to pay for their studies. This is how Alcira came to work as a packer in a cigarette factory, a proofreader, and a nurse.

== Political activity ==
She entered the Faculty of Medicine of the University of Buenos Aires (UBA). In 1931, she joined the Communist Youth Federation, and became a member of the communist student group Insurrexit.

Initially, Alcira de la Peña carried packages to political prisoners, and later she became the Secretary of the International Red Aid organization. Due to her activity, she was arrested and expelled from UBA. In 1938, she continued her studies at the Faculty of Medical Sciences of the National University of Córdoba. While there, she held directive positions in the local Communist Party, and in 1942, obtained her title of medical surgeon. In 1937, she was one of the founders of the Argentine League for the Rights of Man. Due to her continuing political activity, she was arrested twice in 1943, and finally she was deported to Buenos Aires along with ten other political prisoners and placed on probation. In 1944, she was arrested in La Plata, and after spending 15 days in the basement cells of the police department, she was transferred to the Correctional Prison for Women in Buenos Aires, where she remained for six months.

From 1945 to 1959, she chaired the National Women's Commission of the Communist Party (PCA), and in the following years, she suffered further arrests: in 1947, in 1949, in Entre Ríos, and then in Chile upon her return from Europe. In 1945, she was appointed a member of the PCA's Central Committee, and in 1946, she was a member of its Executive Commission.

Faced with the impossibility of practicing medicine, she decided to dedicate herself fully to politics. In 1951, she was the PCA's candidate for Vice President of Argentina as the running mate of Rodolfo Ghioldi. In 1954, she was nominated for the same position, and in 1958 she was elected to a four-year term as councilor for the Deliberative Council of Buenos Aires, together Luis Fiori, both for the Communist Party. She and the socialist Josefina Marpons were the first two women to hold that position. While in office, she demanded the freedom of political prisoners – one of the central themes of her political activity over the years – and she prevailed on the body to approve statements in this regard. In 1962, she joined the editorial staff of the International Review, based in Prague.

In 1946, she was involved in the founding of the Women's League of Argentina, along with Fanny Edelman. The following year, she traveled to Moscow and Beijing to attend meetings of the Executive Council of the Women's International Democratic Federation and an Asian women's group, respectively. She was a representative of the PCA at various international communist congresses. In 1966, she headed the party's delegation to the Intercontinental Conference in Havana, at which she rejected the Cuban delegates' proposal to create OLAS, an international entity that would nurture armed organizations in Latin America. When coups d'état occurred in Chile and Uruguay, she performed solidarity work with those countries. In 1975, she was a co-founder of the Permanent Assembly for Human Rights.

In 1982, she was arrested at the premises of the PCA Central Committee on Avenida Entre Ríos, and prosecuted. She participated as a delegate to the PCA's 15th Congress in September 1983. She resigned from her position on the Central Committee after the 16th Party Congress – held in November 1986 – approved a self-criticizing measure regarding the party line of conciliation with respect to the military dictatorship. She regularly contributed to PCA publications, including La Hora, Nueva Era, Nuestra Palabra, and Orientación.

Alcira de la Peña died in Buenos Aires on 15 March 1998.

As a tribute to her career, a street in Salto and a neighborhood in Chacabuco are named after her. In 2002, the Buenos Aires City Legislature named her one of 18 Outstanding Women of the 20th Century.
