= Federación Deportiva Obrera =

Argentinian sporting organization

Federación Deportiva Obrera (Workers Sport Federation, FDO) was a sporting organisation in Argentina, made up by more than 60 football clubs. The federation was founded in 1924, on the initiative of the Communist Party of Argentina. Most FDO clubs were under the control of the Communist Party and worked in close cooperation with the neighbourhood committees of the party. FDO was led by Orestes Ghioldi and Enrique Chiarante. FDO players boycotted interviews for newspapers where there were labour disputes. FDO was dissolved by the Uriburu regime in 1930.
