= Labour Gathering Party =

Defunct communist party in Argentina

The Labour Gathering Party (Spanish: Partido Concentración Obrera) was a political party in Argentina, led by José Penelon. It emerged from a dissident wing of the Communist Party of Argentina in the late 1920s. The party would exist for decades, mainly based in Buenos Aires, but its influence waned over the years.

== The split ==
The party was formed as Communist Party of the Argentine Region (Partido Comunista de la Región Argentina), founded after a split in the Communist Party of Argentina. Penelon and his followers were expelled from the Communist Party in 1927. The Penelon group began publishing Adelante ('Forward') in that year. The Communist Party of the Argentine Region was founded in January 1928.

Most of the cadres of the Communist Youth Federation sided with Penelon in the split. Penelon also won over a large chunk of the Workers Sport Federation. Penelon's followers labelled people the Communist Party as 'radishes' (red on the outside, white on the inside) and those from the Workers Communist Party as 'police agents'.

== Appeals for a United Front ==
Penelon argued for unification of the trade union movement, a line the Communist Party denounced as 'capitulation' to reformists. He opposed the policy of 'dual unionism' put forth by the Communist International. At the time of the 1928 elections, Adelante argued for a united front with the Socialist Party and the trade union centres. Likewise the party also appealed to the Socialist Party, the Independent Socialist Party, the Argentine Anti-Imperialist Alliance, the Red Argentine Anti-Imperialist Alliance and the autonomous trade union centres for a unified May Day celebration.

== Communist Party of the Argentine Republic ==
The party soon changed its name to the Communist Party of the Argentine Republic (Partido Comunista de la República Argentina). The change of the name was caused by a decision of the Central Electoral Junta.

== Uriburu period ==
In 1930 general José Félix Uriburu came to power in Argentina and the party lost its legal status. The party changed its name to Partido Concentración Obrera, and was thus able to regain legal status in a period of repression. The party would cease to be a communist party as such.

== In the City Council ==
Penelon was re-elected to the Buenos Aires City Council in 1932 (he had previously been the sole Communist Party member in the council). The party maintained some influence in the suburbs of Buenos Aires until the 1940s. Penelon remained in the City Council until 1954.

== Later period ==
Penelon ran for Vice President of Argentina in the 1951 election. He obtained merely 3,183 votes. Ahead of the election the Trotskyist Revolutionary Workers Party had begun 'entryism' into Concentración Obrera, but pulled out after the meager election result. After the fall of Perón in 1955, the party was closely linked to the Democratic Socialist Party (the right-wing tendency in the socialist movement). The party merged into the Democratic Socialist Party in the early 1970s.
