= Labour Party (Argentina) =

Political party in Argentina

Labour Party Partido Laborista
- Founder: Juan Perón
- Founded: October 24, 1945 (first); 1957 (second)
- Dissolved: July 1947 (first); 1965 (second)
- Merged into: Peronist Party
- Headquarters: Buenos Aires
- Newspaper: El Laborista
- Ideology: Peronism; Socialism; Syndicalism; Left-wing populism Left-wing nationalism
- Political position: Centre-left
- Colours: Blue and white

The Labour Party (Spanish: Partido Laborista) was a left-wing and populist political party in Argentina. It was created in 1945 by prominent leaders of the trade union movement in Argentina shortly before the 1946 Argentine general election and mobilized working-class support for emerging populist leader Juan Perón. The party ran Perón's presidential ticket for the election. It was inspired and based on the British Labour Party and is considered to have been the first instance of direct electoral mobilization of the working class in Argentina. Its goal was to bring Perón to power and institutionalize the political power of Argentinian trade union movement. After winning the 1946 presidential election, Perón merged the party into his Peronist Party.

The party was part of a larger front of pro-Peronist coalition in the 1946 election, and fielded Perón on its electoral lists together with the conservative Independent Party and the Radical Civic Union Renewal Board, a right-wing splinter of the liberal Radical Civic Union. The Labour Party was the strongest pro-Peronist party in the coalition, and was considered the backbone of Perón's electoral success in the 1946 election. It had a staunchly left-wing and socialist platform which called for far-ranging redistributive measures, introduction of a social security system and pension funds for rural and industrial workers; the platform was embraced by Perón who managed to implement a large majority of the proposed measures under his rule. The party was composed of trade unionists of socialist, anarcho-syndicalist, and communist backgrounds, and became the left wing of the Peronist movement once it was merged into Perón's personal party.

== History ==
The party was founded by Peronist trade union leaders at the end of October 1945. The party organization was built up around the Peronist unions, and most of its representatives in different elected offices had been recruited from the ranks of the trade union movements. The party was led by an Organizing Committee with 52 members. The party had little structure of its own, and its popularity was mainly dependent on being identified with Juan Perón. Luis Gay, of the telephone workers union, was the general secretary of the party. Another prominent trade union leader taking part in the founding of the party was Cipriano Reyes (a leader of the meat-packers union). Reyes became vice president of the party. The party published El Laborista.

Just a few months before the founding of the party, the British Labour Party had won a resounding election victory. The Argentinian party name was borrowed from the British party, and the Argentinian party organization was modelled after its British counterpart (with unions as an integral party organization).

The presidential and parliamentary elections held in February 1946 resulted in a major success for the Labour Party. In the election, Partido Laborista utilized innovative political methods. The leader of the party Luis Gay, stated that "central mass meetings were transmitted to the whole country through the radio, in each locality where the radio network reaches another meeting is held, just before or after the transmission of the central act. Those long, tiresome electoral campaigns no longer exist; the Partido Laborista holds 3, 4 or 5 [central] acts in total, but always with the same character". The party was responsible for mobilizing most of the votes for Juan Perón. Moreover, the party criticized limitations on the freedom of the press. The party called for nationalizations, social welfare, women's suffrage and land reform. In contrast to other parts of the Peronist coalition, the Labour Party had many Jews in its leadership, which allowed the party to denounce and discredit the accusations of Perón being a fascist. The party gained a majority in both chambers of parliament.

The party represented an autonomous political voice of the labour movement, and sought to mediate its desire to remain autonomous and the aspirations of Perón. However, after Perón's victory, it became clear that "Argentine workers had in reality voted for Perón", rather than the Labour Party. In mid-1946 Perón ordered that the three parties that had supported his candidacy be merged into a unity party, Partido Único de la Revolución - the Sole Party of the Revolution. The laboristas initially rejected the idea of a merger into the unity party (which in 1947 was renamed the Peronist Party). However, in July 1947 it decided to dissolve itself and called on its members to join the Peronist Party as its 'labour nucleus'. Regarding the absorption of the Labour Party into the big tent of Peronism, James P. Brennan noted that "despite the objections from much of the old guard leadership, there was little protest from the vast majority of workers."

After the Labour Party had been disbanded, a few of its former leaders (such as Reyes) suffered from government repression. Reyes led a tiny fraction of the party that resisted its merger into the Peronist Party, and became the sole representative of the Labour Party in the Lower House. Despite the overwhelming support of trade unions for Perón, Reyes would hold his own counter-rallies in late 1946.

In July 1947, Reyes suffered a heart attack, which limited his ability to challenge Peronism, and in early 1948 his two-year mandate expired. In September 1948 a plot to assassinate Perón was uncovered which Reyes was accused to be the main instigator of - he was subsequently arrested and remained imprisoned until 1955. Luis Gay also resisted Peronist institutionalisation, and remained head of the CGT until January 1947, when he visited the American Federation of Labor (AFL). This led to accusations of Gay being a pawn of US interests; Gay resigned on 29 January 1947 and was replaced by Jose Espejo, an ardent left-wing Peronist.

Perón quickly delivered on his promises after the election and adopted the program of the Labour Party, and his responsiveness to social demands significantly contributed to his popularity among the working class. In May 1946, Perón created the pension fund for industrial workers, and universalized pension insurance coverage in Argentina. His push to incorporate several professions into other existing funds gave coverage to hitherto excluded groups, which doubled the number of workers covered by pensions. Perón would also consolidate his control over the trade union movement in Argentina, and achieved a near-complete control over nearly all trade unions by 1950. At the same time, he actively promoted organizing efforts, expanding union density among the Argentine workforce from 18% in 1946 to nearly 50% by 1954.

Despite their absorption into the Peronist Party, the Labour Party continued to exist as a left-wing faction within the Peronist movement, and continued to wield significant influence over Perón. Perón adopted the ideology and proposals of the party despite its socialist and progressive nature, and relied on the support of trade union leadership. James Brennan concludes that thanks to the Labour Party, "the initiative [would] very much lay with the trade union movement; Perón was more its creature than the labor movement was his."

Following the Revolución Libertadora, in 1957 Cipriano Reyes refounded the party. It participated in the 1957 Argentine Constitutional Assembly election, as well as elections in 1960, 1963, and 1965, before being dissolved again.

== Ideology ==
The party was socialist and syndicalist in nature, and its rank-and-file was composed of dissident socialists, communists, Trotskyists as well as leftist defectors from the Radical Civic Union. Because of this, the party's platform was very progressive and called for socialist - the party condemned racism and similar forms of discrimination and institutional inequality, and called for extension of political rights to Argentinian women. It proposed a socialist economy based on redistributive mechanics and a universical security system, including universal public healthcare and pension program for domestic service workers. The party also wanted to reach out to groups that it considers unorganized or maringalized, and envisioned Peronism as a left-wing alliance of "workers, employees, peasants, artists, and intellectuals as well as small merchants, manufacturers and agricultural producers". Labour Party had a profound influence on Perón's policies, and because of this "the Peronist Party took a decidedly progressive course in social policy."

Labour Party was to be an Argentinian equivalent of the British Labour Party, and was dominated by trade union leaders and members. However, it had a "strictly socialist" program that advocated state control of the economy and a welfare state, as well as state-enforced profit-sharing for the workers and political reform that would give trade unions a direct impact on state legislature. The party also had strong nationalist and protectionist tendencies, combined with social progressivism and calls for solidarity with marginalized groups. The party was quick to adopt the Peronist rhetoric as well, such as populism; in one of its 1946 announcements, the Labour Party stated: "The old traditional parties, for many years passed, have ceased to be voices of the people in order to act instead in small circles of clear unpopular character, deaf and blind to the worries of that mass whose aid they only think to call upon when elections come around."

What differed the Labour Party from Perón was the issue of the Catholic Church - the party had a socialist background and leaned towards anti-clerical positions, including removing religion and the Church from Argentine education. This put the party in a conflict with other Peronist wings, of which many had Catholic components. Perón himself "weaved between the anticlerical views of labour leaders and the official adoption of social Catholicism." He ratified the Religious Education Decree which empowered the role of the Church in education, but also sought to demonstrate that he was not "in the hands of the Church"; his anti-clerical policies included arresting priests that opposed Peronist trade unions, and withdrawing subsidies to some dioceses.

Along with this, the party shared Peronist hostility towards liberalism and skepticism of democracy. In response to the anti-Peronist opposition accusing Perón of anti-democratic tendencies, the party's delegate replied: "It is not enough to speak of democracy. We don't want a democracy defended by the reactionary capitalists, a democracy which would mean a return to the oligarchy is not something we would support." Sociologist Julio Mafud recalled that when he asked a group of Labour Party's members if they were not concerned that Perón's presidency would undermine freedom of speech, they replied: "Freedom of speech is to do with you people. We have never had it." Shortly before the 1946 election, party leader Luis Gay released a similar announcement, in which he stated:

Political democracy is a lie on its own. It is only a reality when it is accompanied by an economic reconstruction of the economy which makes democracy possible on the terrain of practical happenings. They are lying who do not agree with this concept and only speak of the constitution and of that liberty which they defrauded and denied right up to the coup of 3 June 1943.

== See also ==
- Justicialist Party
- Peronism
- Trade unionism
- Trade unions in Argentina
