= 1973 Argentine general election =

The 1973 Argentine general election can refer to two presidential elections took place in Argentina during the year 1973:

- March 1973 Argentine general election, a presidential election that took place on March 11, 1973
- September 1973 Argentine presidential election, a presidential election that took place on September 23, 1973
