= September 1973 Argentine presidential election =

- 23 September 1973
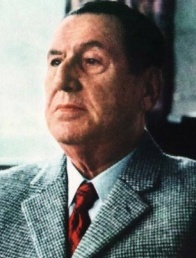

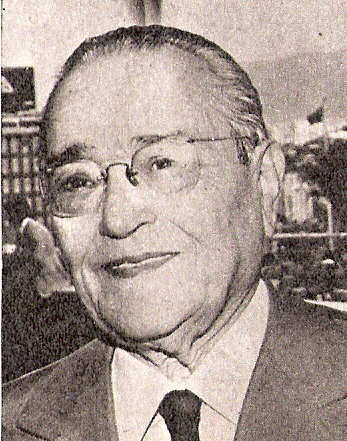

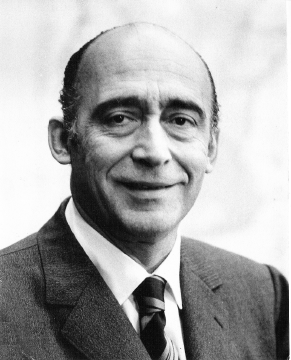
Nominee	Juan Perón	Ricardo Balbín	Francisco Manrique
Party	Justicialist Party	Radical Civic Union	Federal Party
Alliance	FREJULI		APF
Running mate	Isabel Perón	Fernando de la Rúa	Rafael M. Raymonda
Popular vote	7,359,252	2,905,719	1,450,996
Percentage	61.86%	24.42%	12.20%
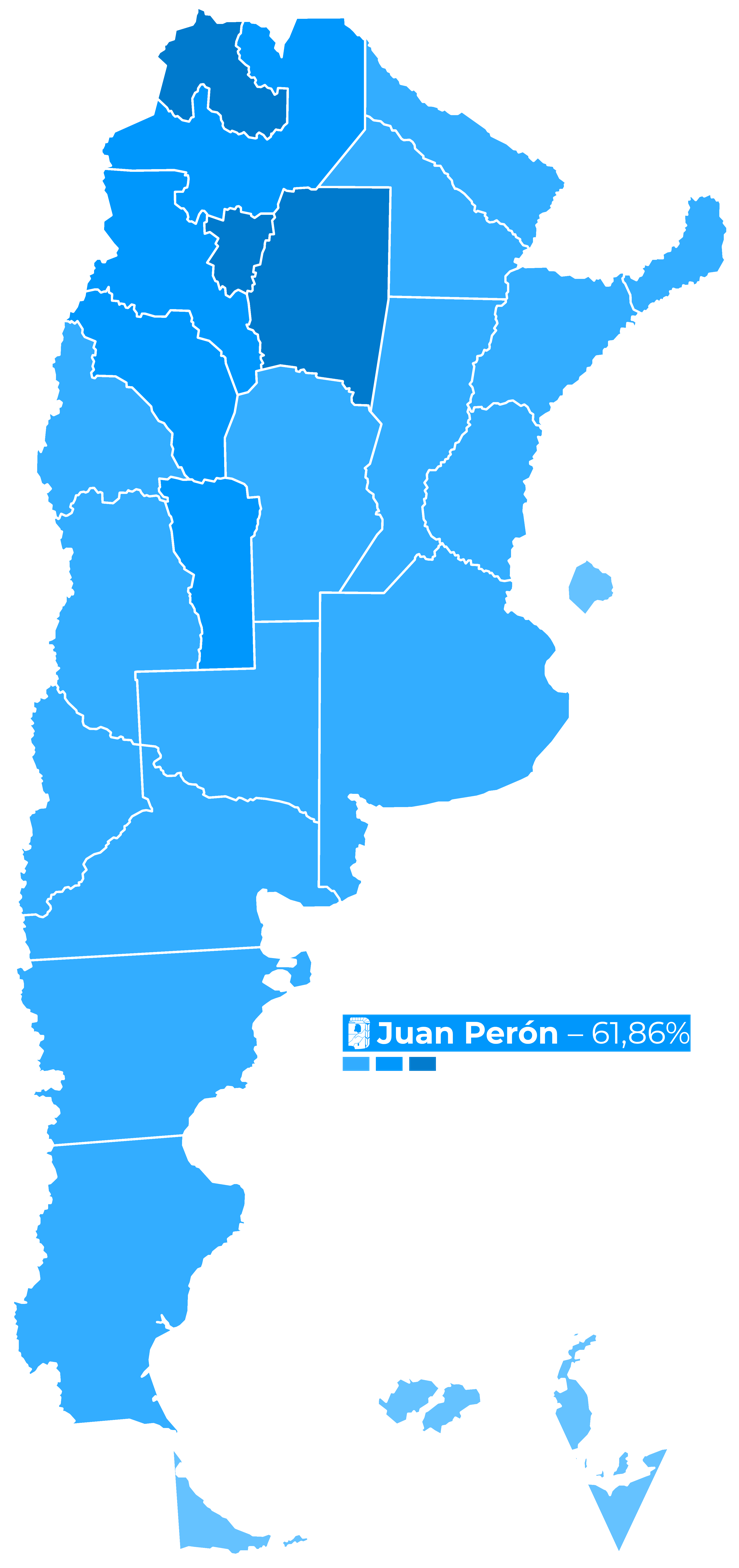
- Results by province
President before election
Raúl Lastiri
Justicialist Party
Elected President
Juan Perón
Justicialist Party

Presidential elections were held in Argentina on 23 September 1973.

== Background ==
The jubilation that followed the May 1973 return to democracy (following over six and a half years of military rule) was soon clouded by political friction and unforeseen events. President Héctor Cámpora, who took his Oath of Office in the presence of Cuban President Osvaldo Dorticós and Chilean leader Salvador Allende—both consular figures in Latin American Marxism—promptly declared a near-blanket amnesty for the several hundred political prisoners held by Alejandro Lanusse's regime (many in inhospitable camps such as the one in Trelew, scene of a 1972 mass execution). Cámpora also made controversial appointments, such as Rodolfo Puiggrós as President of the University of Buenos Aires, Esteban Righi as Minister of the Interior (overseeing law enforcement) and Julio Troxler as Assistant Police Chief of Buenos Aires—all former defense attorneys linked to the violently left-wing Montoneros. A number of left-wing lawyers were also elected to prominent elected posts across the nation, notably Oscar Bidegain (Governor of Buenos Aires Province), Ricardo Obregon Cano (Governor of Córdoba Province) and Alberto Martínez Baca (Governor of Mendoza Province), among others. This new-found prominence among the Argentine left encouraged an increasingly violent reaction among the far right. Among Cámpora's appointees was one insisted on by his patron, Juan Perón: José López Rega, a former policeman with an interest in the occult close to the Perón household since 1965.

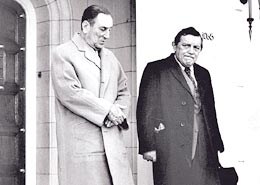
Perón's unconventional bid for new elections was made possible partly by the initial success of José Ber Gelbard's "Social Pact."

López Rega, formally Minister of Social Policy, quickly parlayed his portfolio control over nearly 30 percent of the national budget into a well-funded paramilitary force, the Argentine Anticommunist Alliance (Triple A). Threatened by the Montoneros' inroads into student and neighborhood organizations, local governments and the Peronist Youth, they began targeting many of Cámpora's policy makers, some of which began resigning under pressure from Perón, himself. President Cámpora agreed to have Peronist militants in charge of most security arrangements for Perón's much-anticipated June 20, 1973, return from exile; as the Alitalia flight carrying the leader's retinue descended over Ministro Pistarini International Airport at Ezeiza, however, a scuffle erupted between left and right-wing minders over control of the stage from which Perón would address the nation, leading to a rash of pitched battles resulting in perhaps over a hundred deaths and Perón's public, July 13 suggestion that Cámpora resign.

The calculating López Rega seized on this to prevail on Vice President Vicente Solano Lima and Senate President Alejandro Díaz Bialet to resign, as well, leaving a constitutional vacuum referred to as an "acephaly"—the lack of a head of state. This move created both the need for new elections and the chance to remove a number of Cámpora's leftist advisers; it also left the nation's highest office to the President of the Argentine Chamber of Deputies (lower house), Raúl Lastiri, who was, despite being a year older than López Rega, the powerful Social Policy Minister's son-in-law. The cautious Lastiri continued Cámpora's populist socio-economic policies; inheriting a growing threat from an increasingly armed Peronist Youth and the newly-active Trotskyist People's Revolutionary Army (ERP), which, in only three months, attacked a military installation and murdered a number of military figures, he replaced Interior Minister Righi and called elections for September 23. The runners-up in the March elections—Ricardo Balbín (UCR) and Francisco Manrique (APF)—again accepted their respective party's nomination, with Manrique obtaining the endorsement of the PDP and naming its leader as his running mate.

Increasing violence led many in Argentina, including much of the armed forces to conclude that only Perón commanded enough respect to persuade extremists away from hostilities. Gathering in Buenos Aires' renowned Teatro Colón, the Justicialist Party struggled to nominate Perón's running mate. The choice of the leader's own wife, Isabel, intrigued the convention—she was, after all, the only prominent Peronist (aside from Perón himself) not publicly associated with any one faction within the fractious movement. Opposed to López Rega's suggestion at first, the aging Perón (who would, in theory, serve until May 1977) set aside strong personal doubts as to his wife's readiness for office and agreed. The two sailed into office in a record landslide on the same FREJULI umbrella ticket on which Cámpora had been elected only six months earlier.

== Candidates ==
- Justicialist Liberation Front (populist): Former President Juan Perón of Buenos Aires Province
- Radical Civic Union (centrist): Former Deputy Ricardo Balbín of Buenos Aires Province
- Federalist Popular Alliance (conservative): Former Minister of Social Policy Francisco Manrique of Mendoza Province
- Workers' Socialist Party: Juan Carlos Coral
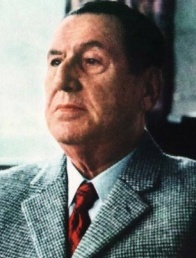
Perón

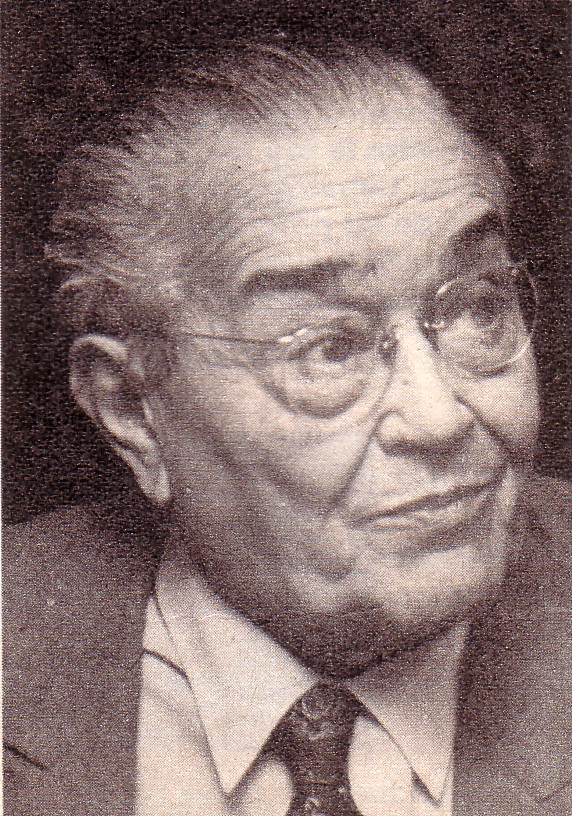
Balbín

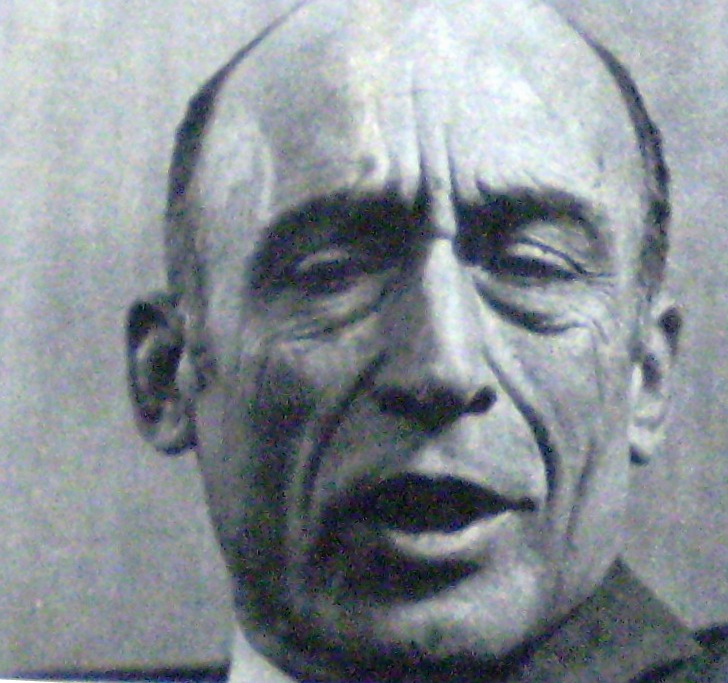
Manrique

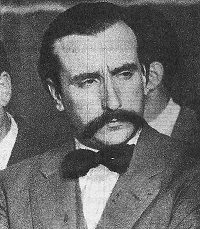
Coral

== Results ==
Candidate	Running mate	Party or alliance		Votes	%
Juan Domingo Perón	Isabel Perón	Perón–Perón	Justicialist Liberation Front	6,469,525	54.38
Juan Domingo Perón	Isabel Perón	Perón–Perón	Popular Left Front	889,727	7.48
Juan Domingo Perón	Isabel Perón	Perón–Perón	Total	7,359,252	61.86
Ricardo Balbín	Fernando de la Rúa	Radical Civic Union		2,905,719	24.42
Francisco Manrique	Rafael Martínez Raymonda	Federalist Popular Alliance		1,450,996	12.20
Juan Carlos Coral	José Francisco Páez	Workers' Socialist Party		181,474	1.53
Total				11,897,441	100.00
Valid votes				11,897,441	98.69
Invalid votes				48,873	0.41
Blank votes				108,778	0.90
Total votes				12,055,092	100.00
Registered voters/turnout				14,276,977	84.44
Source: General Archive of the Nation, National Congress
