= Fernando Iglesias (Argentine politician) =

Argentine politician

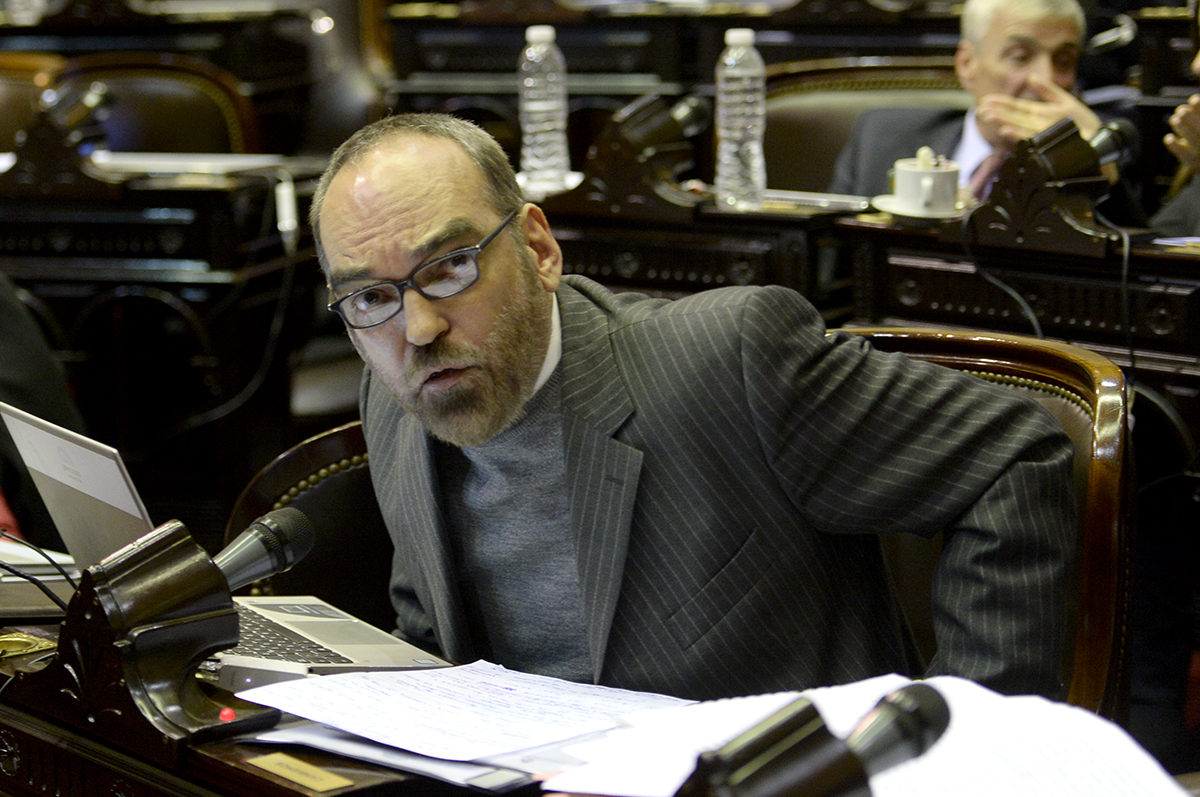

National Deputy
- Incumbent
- Assumed office 10 December 2017
- Constituency: City of Buenos Aires
- In office 10 December 2007 – 10 December 2011
- Constituency: City of Buenos Aires

Personal details
- Born: 14 May 1957 (age 69) Buenos Aires
- Party: Civic Coalition ARI (2007–2011); Republican Proposal (2011–present)
- Other political affiliations: Civic Coalition (2007–2011); Juntos por el Cambio 2015–present)
- Education: National University of Lomas de Zamora; Università di Bologna
- Profession: Politician and writer

Fernando Adolfo Iglesias (born 14 May 1957 in Buenos Aires) is an Argentine journalist, writer, politician, and volleyball player. Currently he is a National Deputy elected in Buenos Aires. He is a member of the center right party Republican Proposal.

Iglesias has been called "the most anti-Peronist deputy of Juntos por el Cambio". He took out several books and compared the Justicialist Party with the "Middle Ages." He analyzes the "eternal-return" of Peronism to power, from a republican and anti-populist perspective.

== Personal life ==
In 1970, Fernando Iglesias joined the Trotskyist Worker's Socialist Party (Spanish: Partido Socialista de los Trabajadores, abbrev. PST), where he saw Juan Carlos Coral and Nora Ciapponi run for president in the 1973 elections. He would later leave the PST and join the Front of Workers for Human Rights (Spanish: Frente de Trabajadores por los Derechos Humanos) to devote himself to human rights advocacy.

He attended the School of Competitive Sports (Spanish: Licenciado en Alto Rendimiento Deportivo) at the National University of Lomas de Zamora, where he trained to become a volleyball player. He moved to Italy post-graduation to play volleyball and resided there for several years. Iglesias returned to Argentina in the mid-1990s and started to work as a truck driver and teach languages and tango. In the meantime, he studied journalism at the Taller Escuela Agencia, where he became interested in globalization. He had written as a columnist for various Argentine newspapers including La Nación, Clarín, and the magazine Noticias. He had also served as a freelance Buenos Aires correspondent for several European media outlets.

He later became a professor at the University of Business and Social Sciences, where he taught the Theory of Globalization and Trade Blocs (Spanish: Teoría de la Globalización y Bloques Regionales). He also taught at the Chair of International Governance (Spanish: la cátedra de Gobernabilidad Internacional del Doctorado de Sociología) at the University of Belgrano.

== Political career ==
From October 2007 to December 2011, Iglesias served as a National Deputy for the centrist Civic Coalition ARI party. A critic of Argentina's media laws, Iglesias joined the Freedom of Expression Committee. He argued that previous reforms made to the media laws were far from sufficient and that the parliamentary debate was excessively short. In 2011, he pushed for a bill that would lead to the nationwide implementation of single ballot voting, which proponents say would prevent ballot theft. He sponsored several bills that would see the creation a national registry of missing individuals, a plan to democratize the trade unions, a plan to oversee social work, and modifications to the civil code on issues like gender-motivated violence and religious liberty.

In 2017, a lawyer close to then-president Mauricio Macri invited Iglesias to join Macri's Cambiemos coalition. Macri highly appreciated Iglesias' passionate speeches in television debates and encouraged him to run for the Chamber of Deputies, the lower house of the Argentine Congress. Later that year, Iglesias ran for National Deputy under the PRO ticket and won with over 50% of the votes. He then joined the Commission of Provision and Social Security (Spanish: Comisión de Previsión y Seguridad Social).

== Political positions ==
Iglesias is a firm critic of former Argentine presidents Néstor Kirchner and his wife Cristina Fernández de Kirchner. He opposed the UNASUR's decision to appoint Néstor Kirchner as its general secretary and accused Cristina Kirchner of leading a government composed of "mafiosi and hooligans" (Spanish: mafias y patotas).

The writer and deputy of Juntos por el Cambio has just released a new book, "The Peronist Middle Ages and the Arrival of the Plague", in which he seeks to disprove the "Peronist version" of history and explain its "eternal return." He analyzes the defeat of Cambiemos and affirms that the mistake "was to give up the cultural battle".

== Publications ==
- República de la Tierra-Globalización: el fin de las Modernidades Nacionales (Republic of the Earth-Globalization: the end of Modern Nations, 2000)
- Twin Towers: el colapso de los estados nacionales (Twin Towers: the collapse of nation states, 2002)
- ¿Qué significa hoy ser de Izquierda? (What does it mean to be a leftist today?, 2004)
- Globalizar la Democracia - Por un Parlamento Mundial (Globalizing Democracy - Towards a World Parliament, 2006)
- Kirchner y yo - por qué no soy kirchnerista (Kirchner and I - why I am not a Kirchnerist, 2007)
- La modernidad global: una revolución copernicana en los asuntos humanos (The global modernity: a Copernican revolution in human affairs, 2011)
- La cuestión Malvinas: crítica del nacionalismo argentino (The Falklands question: a criticism of Argentine nationalism, 2012)
- Es el peronismo, estúpido (It's Peronism, stupid, 2015)
- La Década Sakeada (The Looted Decade, 2016)
- El año que vivimos en peligro (The year where we lived in danger, 2017)
- El Medioevo Peronista (The Peronist middle age, 2020)
