= March 1973 Argentine general election =

- Presidential election
- 11 March 1973
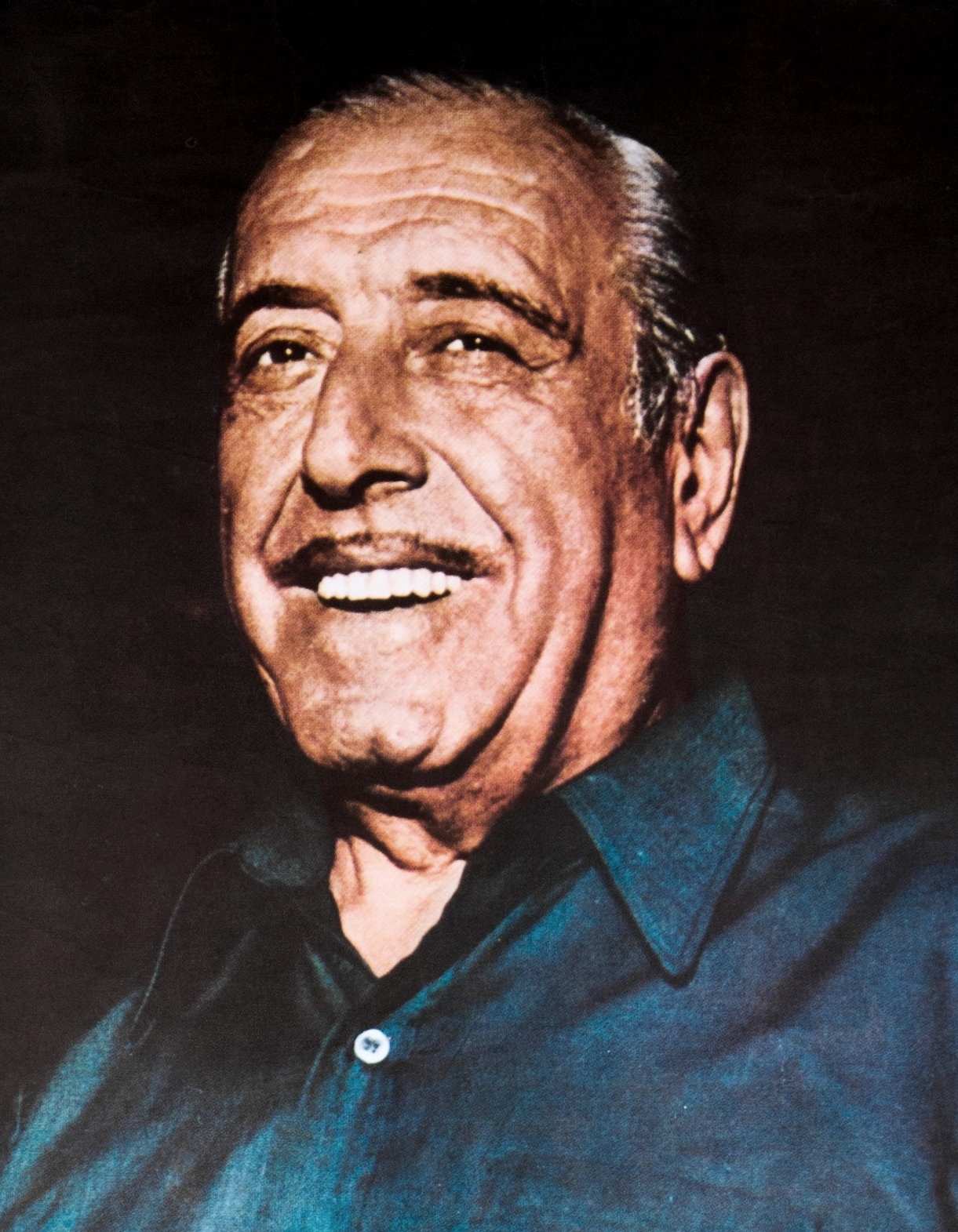

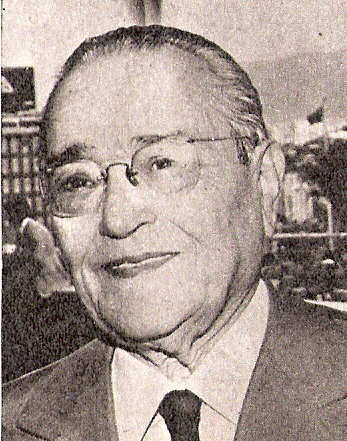

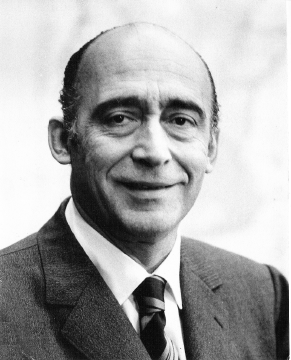

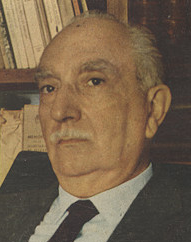
Nominee	Héctor Cámpora	Ricardo Balbín
Party	PJ	UCR
Alliance	FREJULI
Running mate	Vicente Solano Lima	Eduardo Gamond
Popular vote	5,899,642	2,535,581
Percentage	49.53%	21.29%
Nominee	Francisco Manrique	Oscar Alende
Party	Federal Party	PI
Alliance	FPA	APR
Running mate	Rafael Martínez Raymonda	Horacio Sueldo
Popular vote	1,775,767	885,274
Percentage	14.91%	7.43%
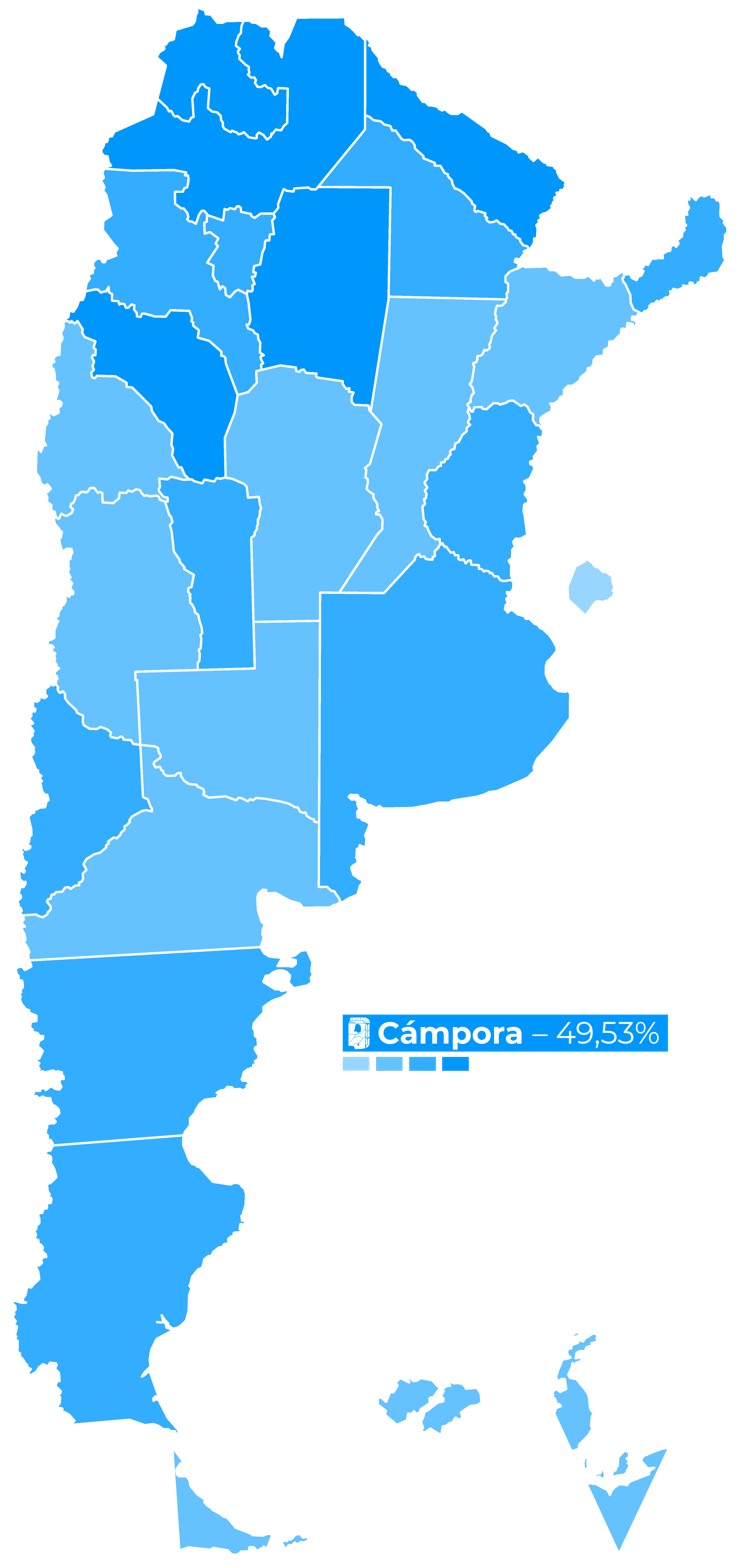
- Results by province
President before election
Alejandro Lanusse
Elected President
Héctor Cámpora
Justicialist Party
- Chamber of Deputies election
- 11 March 1973
- All 243 seats in the Chamber of Deputies
- Turnout: 85.61%
Party	Vote %	Seats
Justicialist Liberation Front	49.60	146
Radical Civic Union	20.43	51
Federalist Popular Alliance	12.87	20
Popular Revolutionary Alliance	6.96	12
Federal Republican Alliance	3.38	10
Salta People's Movement	0.26	1
Neuquén People's Movement	0.24	2
Chubut Action Party	0.10	1
This lists parties that won seats. See the complete results below.
- Senate election
- 11 March 1973 (first round); 15 April 1973 (second round)
- All 69 seats in the Senate
- Turnout: 85.55%
Party	Seats
Justicialist Liberation Front	45
Radical Civic Union	12
Federalist Popular Alliance	5
Federal Republican Alliance	4
Neuquén People's Movement	2
Salta People's Movement	1
This lists parties that won seats. See the complete results below.
Chamber of Deputies results by province

General elections were held in Argentina on 11 March 1973, with a second round of elections for the Senate on 15 April. Voters chose both the President and their legislators.

== Background ==
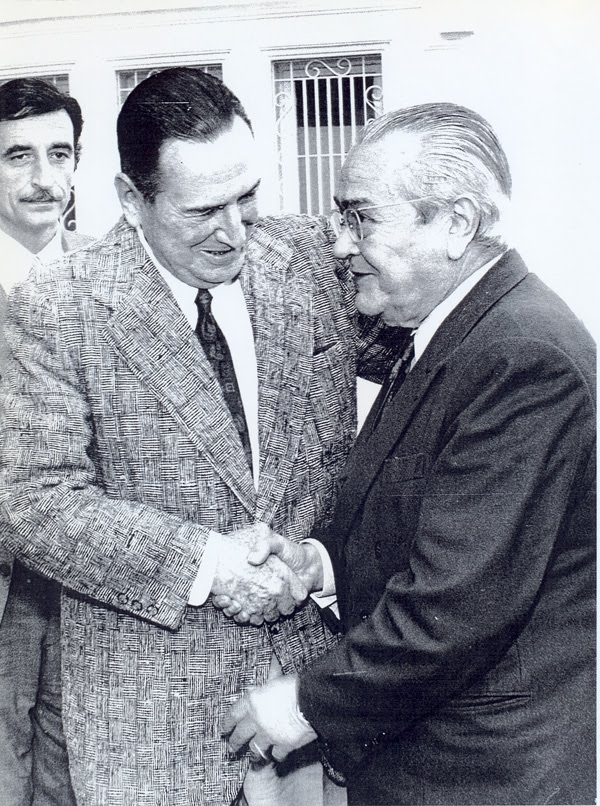
UCR leader Ricardo Balbín and Juan Perón, who again, in exile, became the central issue of the 1973 campaign.

The 1966 coup d'état against the moderate President Arturo Illia was carried out largely as a reaction to Illia's decision to honor local and legislative elections in which Peronists, officially banned from political activity following the violent overthrow of President Juan Perón in 1955, did well. Five years later, however, President Alejandro Lanusse found himself heading an unpopular junta, saddled by increasing political violence and an economic wind-down from the prosperous 1960s. Seizing the initiative, he gathered leaders from across the nation's political and intellectual spectrum for a July 1971 asado, a time-honored Argentine custom as much about camaraderie as about steak.

The result was Lanusse's "Great National Agreement," a road map to the return to democratic rule, including Peronists (the first such concession the military had made since Perón's 1955 exile). The agreement, however, bore little resemblance to what had been discussed and, instead, proposed virtual veto power for the armed forces over most future domestic and foreign policy. This patently unacceptable condition led most political figures to dismiss the much-touted event as the "Great National Asado," instead.

A year later, President Lanusse made the much-anticipated announcement: elections would be held, nationally, on March 11, 1973. Retaliating for Perón's unequivocal rejection of the 1971 accords, Lanusse limited the field of candidates to those residing in Argentina as of August 25, 1972 - a clear denial of the aging Perón the right to run on his own party's ticket (the likely winners). Perón did return to Argentina, however, on November 17, when, during a month-long stay, he secured the endorsement of prominent figures such as former President Arturo Frondizi of the Integration and Development Movement, Jorge Abelardo Ramos of the Popular Leftist Front (FIP), Popular Conservative Alberto Fonrouge, Christian Democrat Carlos Imbaud, and other, mainly provincial parties. These diverse parties signed on to an umbrella ticket, led by the Justicialist Party and Perón's personal representative in Argentina, Héctor Cámpora. Partly in recognition for their support and to provide a counter-weight to the left-leaning Cámpora, Perón had the Justicialist Liberation Front (FREJULI) nominate for Vice President Popular Conservative leader Vicente Solano Lima, a newspaper publisher respected across most of Argentina's vastly diverse political spectrum.

Given little time to campaign by the calculating Lanusse (who fielded his own candidate, Brigadier General Ezequiel Martínez, for his ad hoc Federal Republican Alliance), the nation's myriad parties jockeyed for alliances and rushed to name candidates. The main opposition, the centrist Radical Civic Union (UCR), put forth their 1958 nominee, former Congressman Ricardo Balbín (head of the party's more conservative wing). Hoping to carry the mantle of those supporting Lanusse, Social Policy Minister Francisco Manrique ran on the Federalist ticket and Américo Ghioldi, who had led a split in the Socialist Party in 1958, ran on his Democratic Socialist slate - refusing (as the traditional Socialists had done) to endorse the Popular Revolutionary Alliance headed by former Governor Oscar Alende (the runner-up in the 1963 election).

The March 11 polls went smoothly and the FREJULI, which needed 50% of the total to avoid a runoff as per Lanusse's agreement, garnered 49.53%. Realizing that the FREJULI was less than 0.5% short of the agreed threshold, plus having a 28% margin over the runners-up (the UCR), the seasoned Balbín petitioned President Lanusse for a waiver of the rule, something he granted, making the FREJULI alliance the winners of the March 11, 1973, election and paving the way for the definitive return of Juan Perón, whom Lanusse, many years later, would admit to being his "life's obsession."

== Candidates ==
- Justicialist Liberation Front (populist): Former Deputy Héctor Cámpora of Buenos Aires Province
- Radical Civic Union (centrist): Former Deputy Ricardo Balbín of Buenos Aires Province
- Federalist Popular Alliance (conservative): Former Minister of Social Policy Francisco Manrique of Mendoza Province
- Popular Revolutionary Alliance (social democratic): Former Governor Oscar Alende of Buenos Aires Province
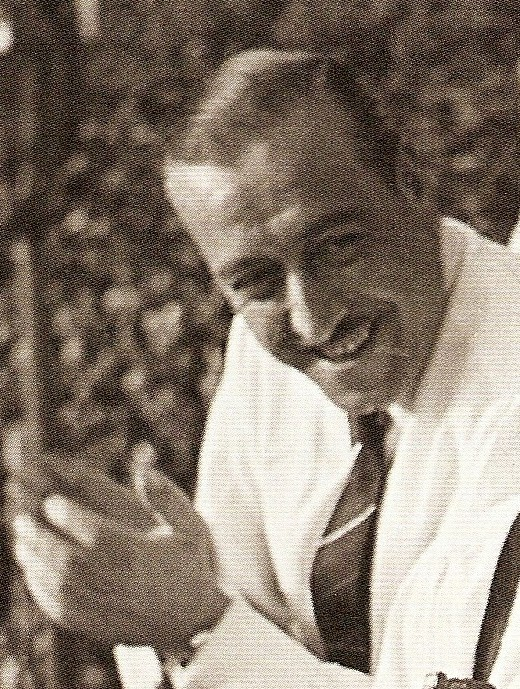
Cámpora

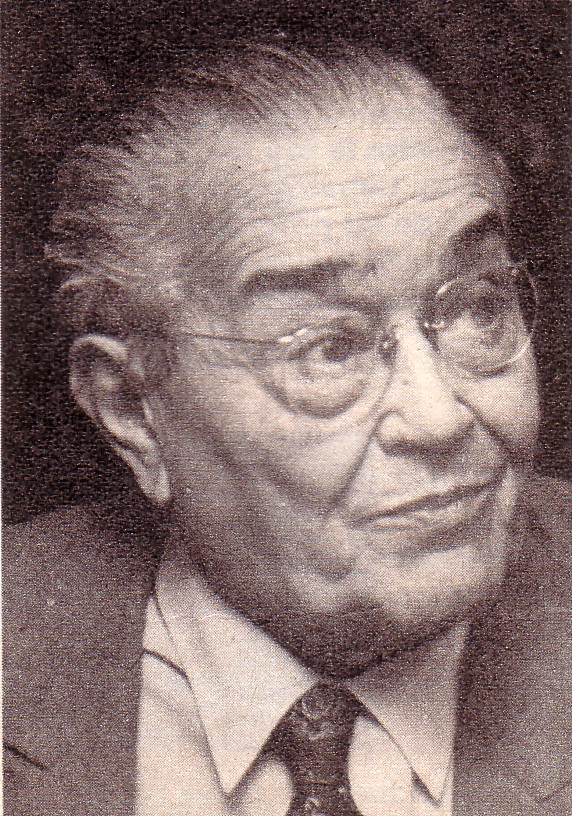
Balbín

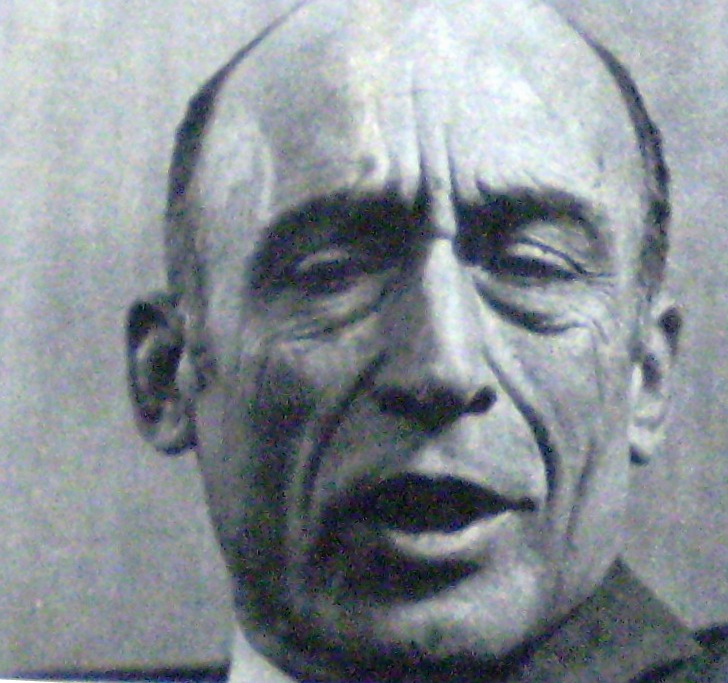
Manrique

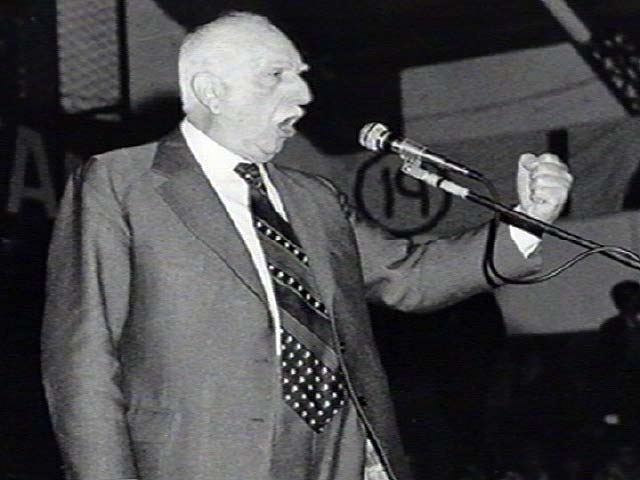
Alende

== Results ==
=== President ===
Candidate	Running mate	Party	Votes	%
Héctor José Cámpora	Vicente Solano Lima	Justicialist Liberation Front	5,899,642	49.53
Ricardo Balbín	Eduardo Gamond	Radical Civic Union	2,535,581	21.29
Francisco Manrique	Rafael Martínez Raymonda	Federalist Popular Alliance	1,775,767	14.91
Oscar Alende	Horacio Sueldo	Popular Revolutionary Alliance	885,274	7.43
Ezequiel Alfredo Martínez	Leopoldo Bravo	Federal Republican Alliance	347,262	2.92
Julio Chamizo	Raúl Ondarts	New Force	235,188	1.97
Américo Ghioldi	René Balestra	Democratic Socialist Party	109,068	0.92
Juan Carlos Coral	Nora Ciapponi	Workers' Socialist Party	73,799	0.62
Jorge Abelardo Ramos	José Silvetti	Popular Left Front	48,571	0.41
Total			11,910,152	100.00
Valid votes			11,910,152	97.82
Invalid votes			51,284	0.42
Blank votes			214,575	1.76
Total votes			12,176,011	100.00
Registered voters/turnout			14,276,977	85.28
Source: General Archive of the Nation, National Congress

=== Chamber of Deputies ===
Party or alliance		Votes	%	Seats
Justcialist; Liberation; Front	Justicialist Liberation Front	4,589,247	38.63	102
Justcialist; Liberation; Front	Integration and Development Movement	670,183	5.64	15
Justcialist; Liberation; Front	Justicialist Party	574,905	4.84	28
Justcialist; Liberation; Front	Renewal Crusade	27,706	0.23	1
Justcialist; Liberation; Front	United People's Front	18,113	0.15	0
Justcialist; Liberation; Front	Christian Popular Party	4,093	0.03	0
Justcialist; Liberation; Front	17 de Octubre	7,050	0.06	0
Justcialist; Liberation; Front	Three Flags Party	23	0.00	0
Justcialist; Liberation; Front	Total	5,891,320	49.60	146
Radical Civic Union		2,427,130	20.43	51
Federalist; Popular; Alliance	Federalist Popular Alliance	701,908	5.91	11
Federalist; Popular; Alliance	Federalist Popular Confederation	180,164	1.52	3
Federalist; Popular; Alliance	Democratic Progressive Party	144,078	1.21	0
Federalist; Popular; Alliance	Popular Union	97,981	0.82	0
Federalist; Popular; Alliance	Federal Renewal Party	96,971	0.82	0
Federalist; Popular; Alliance	Federalist Party	85,398	0.72	0
Federalist; Popular; Alliance	Federal Vanguard	70,706	0.60	2
Federalist; Popular; Alliance	Jujuy People's Movement	32,376	0.27	1
Federalist; Popular; Alliance	Pampa Federalist Movement	32,186	0.27	2
Federalist; Popular; Alliance	Catamarca People's Movement	16,561	0.14	1
Federalist; Popular; Alliance	UP–APF	16,213	0.14	0
Federalist; Popular; Alliance	Provincial Defence–White Flag	12,219	0.10	0
Federalist; Popular; Alliance	Federal Movement	11,625	0.10	0
Federalist; Popular; Alliance	Provincial Union	11,432	0.10	0
Federalist; Popular; Alliance	Liberal Democratic Party	8,421	0.07	0
Federalist; Popular; Alliance	Federal Democratic Party	4,675	0.04	0
Federalist; Popular; Alliance	Popular Democratic Party	2,679	0.02	0
Federalist; Popular; Alliance	Renewal Action	2,664	0.02	0
Federalist; Popular; Alliance	Total	1,528,257	12.87	20
Popular; Revolutionary; Alliance	Popular Revolutionary Alliance	796,625	6.71	12
Popular; Revolutionary; Alliance	Christian Revolutionary Party	25,359	0.21	0
Popular; Revolutionary; Alliance	Intransigent Party	4,603	0.04	0
Popular; Revolutionary; Alliance	Total	826,587	6.96	12
Federal; Republican; Alliance	Democratic Party	133,598	1.12	2
Federal; Republican; Alliance	Federal Republican Alliance	44,437	0.37	0
Federal; Republican; Alliance	Autonomist–Liberal Pact	93,958	0.79	3
Federal; Republican; Alliance	Blockist Party	70,801	0.60	3
Federal; Republican; Alliance	Río Negro Provincial Party	19,555	0.16	1
Federal; Republican; Alliance	Provincial People's Movement	14,410	0.12	1
Federal; Republican; Alliance	Popular Federalist Party	12,231	0.10	0
Federal; Republican; Alliance	Civic Combatant Crusade	8,055	0.07	0
Federal; Republican; Alliance	Workers' White Party	3,296	0.03	0
Federal; Republican; Alliance	Conservative Democratic Party	857	0.01	0
Federal; Republican; Alliance	Total	401,198	3.38	10
New Force (Argentina)	New Force	318,919	2.68	0
New Force (Argentina)	Republican Party	4,210	0.04	0
New Force (Argentina)	Total	323,129	2.72	0
Democratic Socialist Party		209,599	1.76	0
Workers' Socialist Party		103,481	0.87	0
Popular Left Front		54,885	0.46	0
Salta People's Movement		30,891	0.26	1
Neuquén People's Movement		28,898	0.24	2
Labor Party		13,611	0.11	0
Chubut Action Party		11,976	0.10	1
United People's Movement		6,782	0.06	0
Socialist Party		4,711	0.04	0
Tucumán People's Movement		4,413	0.04	0
Popular Socialist Party		4,016	0.03	0
Republican Union		3,177	0.03	0
Liberation Front		2,368	0.02	0
Labor Defenders		1,344	0.01	0
Nationalist Movement		753	0.01	0
Fuegian Popular Union		163	0.00	0
Total		11,878,689	100.00	243
Valid votes		11,878,689	97.07	
Invalid votes		46,748	0.38	
Blank votes		311,382	2.54	
Total votes		12,236,819	100.00	
Registered voters/turnout		14,293,548	85.61	
Source: General Archive of the Nation, National Congress

=== Senate ===
Party or alliance		First round			Second round			Total seats
Party or alliance		Votes	%	Seats	Votes	%	Seats	Total seats
Justcialist; Liberation; Front	Justicialist Liberation Front			11			21	32
Justcialist; Liberation; Front	Integration and Development Movement			0			3	3
Justcialist; Liberation; Front	Justicialist Party			6			4	10
Justcialist; Liberation; Front	Renewal Crusade			0			0	0
Justcialist; Liberation; Front	Total			17			28	45
Radical Civic Union				4			8	12
Federalist; Popular; Alliance	Federalist Popular Alliance			0			1	1
Federalist; Popular; Alliance	Democratic Progressive Party			0			0	0
Federalist; Popular; Alliance	Popular Union			0			0	0
Federalist; Popular; Alliance	Federal Vanguard			1			0	1
Federalist; Popular; Alliance	Jujuy People's Movement			1			0	1
Federalist; Popular; Alliance	Pampa Federalist Movement			0			1	1
Federalist; Popular; Alliance	Catamarca People's Movement			1			0	1
Federalist; Popular; Alliance	Total			3			2	5
Popular Revolutionary Alliance				0			0	0
Federal; Republican; Alliance	Federal Republican Alliance			0			0	0
Federal; Republican; Alliance	Democratic Party of Mendoza			0			1	1
Federal; Republican; Alliance	Autonomist–Liberal Pact			0			1	1
Federal; Republican; Alliance	Blockist Party			0			1	1
Federal; Republican; Alliance	Río Negro Provincial Party			0			0	0
Federal; Republican; Alliance	Provincial Popular Movement			0			1	1
Federal; Republican; Alliance	Total			0			4	4
Salta People's Movement				1			0	1
Neuquén People's Movement				2			0	2
Chubut Action Party				0			0	0
Total				27			42	69

=== Provincial governors ===
Election of Provincial Governors
Elected: 22 provincial governors
Province	Elected	Party	Map
Buenos Aires	Oscar Bidegain	Justicialist Liberation Front	
Catamarca	Hugo Alberto Mott	Justicialist Liberation Front	
Chaco	Deolindo Bittel	Justicialist Liberation Front	
Chubut	Benito Fernández	Justicialist Liberation Front	
Córdoba	Ricardo Obregón Cano	Justicialist Liberation Front	
Corrientes	Julio Romero	Justicialist Liberation Front	
Entre Ríos	Enrique Tomás Cresto	Justicialist Liberation Front	
Formosa	Antenor Argentino Gauna	Justicialist Liberation Front	
Jujuy	Carlos Snopek	Justicialist Liberation Front	
La Pampa	Aquiles José Regazzoli	Justicialist Liberation Front	
La Rioja	Carlos Menem	Justicialist Liberation Front	
Mendoza	Alberto Martínez Baca	Justicialist Liberation Front	
Misiones	Juan Manuel Irrazábal	Justicialist Liberation Front	
Neuquén	Felipe Sapag	Neuquén People's Movement	
Río Negro	Mario José Franco	Justicialist Liberation Front	
Salta	Miguel Ragone	Justicialist Liberation Front	
San Juan	Eloy Camus	Justicialist Liberation Front	
San Luis	Elías Adre	Justicialist Liberation Front	
Santa Cruz	Jorge Cepernic	Justicialist Liberation Front	
Santa Fe	Carlos Sylvestre Begnis	Integration and Development Movement	
Santiago del Estero	Carlos Juárez	Justicialist Liberation Front	
Tucumán	Amado Juri	Justicialist Liberation Front	
