= National Left =

National Left may refer to:

- National Left (Argentina), an Argentinian political party
- The National Left (Israel), a left-wing Zionist movement in Israel
- National Left (Australia), a faction of the Australian Labor Party
- New National Left, a far-right political party in Spain
