= Alberto María Fonrouge =

Argentine politician and lawyer

Alberto Fonrouge

National Senator
- In office May 3, 1973 – March 24, 1976
- Constituency: Buenos Aires

Personal details
- Born: March 6, 1913 Lomas de Zamora
- Died: March 28, 2012 (aged 99) La Falda, Córdoba
- Party: Popular Conservative Party
- Spouse: Angélica Aranda
- Education: University of Buenos Aires
- Profession: Lawyer

Alberto María Fonrouge (March 6, 1913 – March 28, 2012) was an Argentine politician and lawyer, co-founder of the Popular Conservative Party and Senator from 1973 to 1976.

== Biography ==
Fonrouge was born in Lomas de Zamora, a suburb south of Buenos Aires, to Dolores Seguí and Alberto Marcelo Fonrouge; the latter served as Mayor of Lomas de Zamora, and died in 1929. Fonrouge earned a Law Degree at the University of Buenos Aires. He specialized in commercial and criminal law, and became an active civic booster for Lomas de Zamora and its surroundings, opening the first clinic in Villa Centenario (one of the district's more disadvantaged areas) in 1940 and later establishing the local chapters of the Breadmakers' and Taxi Drivers' Unions. He inaugurated his first law office in 1948 in Lomas de Zamora, and later opened offices in downtown Buenos Aires, Cañuelas, and La Plata. He married Angélica Aranda, and they had five children.

Fonrouge acted as defense attorney to numerous Peronists and others persecuted in the aftermath of the 1955 overthrow of the populist President Juan Perón. Following a schism in the Conservative Party convention in 1957, Fonrouge and his law partner, Vicente Solano Lima, co-founded the Popular Conservative Party. Their party platform differed from their Conservative Party colleagues in that they supported most of Perón's social reforms, as well as the lifting of the ban order on Peronism itself. They were consequently banned from fielding candidates in the 1958 and 1963 general elections, and instead endorsed the UCRI and MID via an alliance with two leading developmentalist figures, Santa Fe Province Governor Carlos Sylvestre Begnis and President Arturo Frondizi. He was a frequent guest commentator on Channel 13, and in 1966 was named Man of the Year by Gente magazine.

As one of the leading non-Peronist advocates for both the lifting of the ban on Peronism as well as for allowing Perón himself to return from exile, Fonrouge participated in many of the negotiations held between the Argentine Government and Perón at the latter's Puerta de Hierro (Madrid) residence. His efforts led to his appointment as Secretary General and chief counsel for the FREJULI alliance, formed by Perón's Justicialist Party and its alles (including Fonrouge's Popular Conservatives) ahead of the March 1973 general elections. The FREJULI alliance won in a landslide, and Fonrouge was elected to the Argentine Senate for the Province of Buenos Aires, the nation's largest; he was sworn in on May 3, 1973.

Remaining active in his community, among Fonrouge's accomplishments as Senator was the establishment of the University of Lomas de Zamora in 1974. He also maintained a good working relationship with Ricardo Balbín, the longtime head of the Peronists' chief congressional opposition, the centrist UCR. He and Balbín were specifically recommended by the dying Perón (now in his last term in office as president) to his wife and successor, Isabel, as reliable sources of advice once she took office; he died in July 1974. Mrs. Perón, however, relied primarily on her fascist astrologer, José López Rega, instead, and amid mounting chaos a March 1976 coup ended both her presidency and the tenures of all elected officials at the time; Fonrouge was reportedly the only Senator who was allowed to retrieve his belongings from his Senate offices undisturbed by military guards.

Fonrouge, as he had after the 1955 coup, became one of the most prominent defense attorneys to jailed Peronists during the Dirty War, and in 1982 was named chief counsel for the Buenos Aires Province Justicialist Party; among his more notable clients in prison at the time was the deposed Governor of Chaco Province, Deolindo Bittel. Bittel was later nominated for the Vice Presidency, albeit unsuccessfully, when elections were ultimately called in 1983. Fonrouge later taught at the Universities of Buenos Aires, del Salvador, and John F. Kennedy. He was offered a post as a Supreme Court Justice in 1990 by President Carlos Menem, but declined the nomination. He continued to teach constitutional law until age 88, and served as a member in the Carlos Pellegrini Commission (a historical society devoted to the former president from 1890 to 1892). Fonrouge relocated to scenic La Falda, Córdoba upon his retirement, and died in 2012 at age 99.

== Bibliography ==
- Las Malvinas, el Beagle y el Congreso Nacional
- Objetivos jurídicos-políticos de la ley que proclama el día de las Islas Malvinas
- ¿Un Primer Ministro en la Argentina?
