= Juan Carlos Coral =

Argentinian politician (1933–2018)

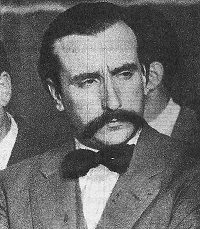

National Deputy
- In office 12 October 1963 – 28 June 1966
- Constituency: Buenos Aires

Personal details
- Born: 24 November 1933 Quequén, Argentina
- Died: 23 August 2018 (aged 84) La Plata, Argentina
- Party: Argentine Socialist Party; Worker's Socialist Party

Juan Carlos Coral (November 24, 1933 – August 23, 2018) was an Argentine socialist politician, distinguished for his political career shared with Alfredo Palacios. He became one of the most renamed figures for Socialism in Argentina.

== Biography ==
=== Early years ===
Coral started his political career joining the Socialist Party in 1955, supporting the insurrection against the anti-socialist government of Juan Perón. After the executions of José León Suárez, where five civilians and eighteen Army officers who rebelled against the dictatorship were killed by firing squads, Coral stated that "the worst mistake made by the party was supporting the coup against Perón and joining the Democratic Union".

=== Politician of the PSA ===
The Socialist Party suffered a break when Alfredo Palacios and Alicia Moreau de Justo formed their own fraction: the Argentine Socialist Party. Coral, who admired both, joined them. He won a seat for the Chamber of Deputies in the 1963 General election, which could maintain winning again in the 1965 Legislative election. He was deposed by the military after the 1966 Coup, which declared the closure of both the Senate and the Chamber of Deputies as well as the abolition of all political parties. During the dictatorship, Coral stood away from left-wing guerrillas such as Montoneros and the ERP. Instead, he supported Nahuel Moreno and his ideas of an independent proletariat and the development of mobilizations and not guerrillas; these ideals strengthened after the Cordobazo.

=== Politician of the PST ===
After the Great Nacional Accord, democracy was restored and the dictator, Alejandro Lanusse, called out for elections. With the re-establishment of partidista politics, Moreno founded the Worker's Socialist Party. Instead of running for president himself, he chose Coral as candidate along with Nora Ciaponni. The Party got 0.62% of the votes in March elections and 1.54% of the votes in September elections. The party went underground when the Military Dictatorship of 1976 started persecuting dissidents, dissolving in 1982.

=== Last years ===
After the military coup of 1976, Coral escaped to Venezuela to avoid being hunted down. He returned to Argentina some time after the dictatorship and died on August 23, 2018.
