= Carlos Humberto Perette =

Argentine politician and lawyer

Carlos Perette
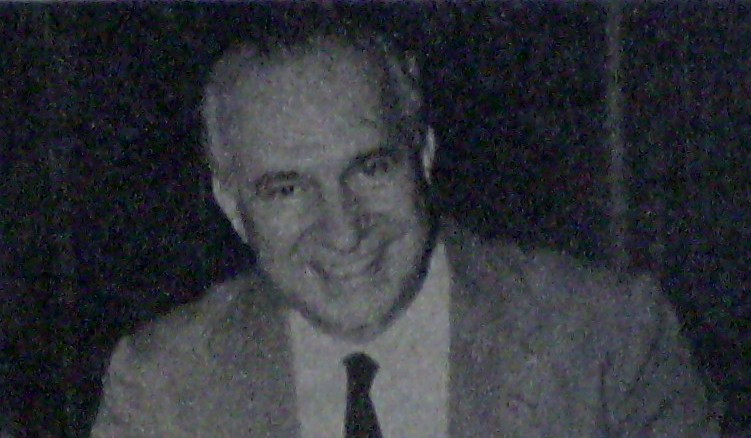

26th Vice President of Argentina
- In office October 12, 1963 – June 28, 1966
- President: Arturo Illia
- Preceded by: Alejandro Gómez
- Succeeded by: Vicente Solano Lima

Personal details
- Born: December 12, 1915 Paraná; Entre Ríos Province
- Died: June 18, 1992 (aged 76) Buenos Aires
- Party: Radical Civic Union (UCR)
- Profession: Lawyer

Carlos Humberto Perette (December 12, 1915 – June 18, 1992) was an Argentine Radical Civic Union politician and lawyer. He was a provincial legislator, national deputy, senator, Vice-President and ambassador.

== Life and times ==
Perette was born in Paraná, Entre Ríos and was educated at the National University of the Littoral where he studied law.

In his youth, he was a footballer who played in the first division at Estudiantes de Paraná. His brother Francisco Perette would become President of the Argentine Football Association (AFA).

Perette became involved with the Radical Party at a young age and in the late 1930s served first as President of the Youth Chapter of the Paraná UCR, and later of Entre Ríos Province's chapter. In 1943 he was elected to the Entre Ríos legislature, in elections that were won by his party headed by Eduardo Laurencena who was elected governor. Laurencena was prevented from taking office, however, by military intervention. Perette was elected a provincial deputy once again in 1946, a leading opponent of Peronist governor Hector Maya. Following his re-election in 1950, Perette served as President of the UCR bloc in the legislature.

In 1952 Perette was elected as a national deputy and headed the greatly reduced UCR bloc towards the end of the second term of President Juan Domingo Perón. Perette was a leading 'unionist', the wing of his party which became the UCRP during the party's split ahead of the 1957 Constitutional Assembly elections. To Perette is attributed the Pueblo ('People') tag of the party, meant to differentiate from the opposing ideas of Arturo Frondizi. Returning to the Argentine Chamber of Deputies between 1958 and 1962, he was the Vice President of the UCRP bloc. In the subsequently annulled elections of 18 March 1962 Perette was decisively beaten for the governorship of his province by the UCRI ('Intransigent Radical') candidate.

In 1963, Perette was elected Vice President of Argentina as the running mate for UCRP candidate Arturo Illia. Perette was an enthusiastic supporter of co-operatives and introduced legislation to support them. He played a decisive role in the construction of the Uranga-Begnis tunnel under the Paraná River between the cities of Paraná and Santa Fe, helping integrate the Argentine Mesopotamia into the rest of the nation upon its 1969 opening.

Illia and Perette was removed during the coup of June 28, 1966. He continued to follow Ricardo Balbín's style of Radicalism - the 'National Line' (Línea Nacional) - within the reunited UCR. He was elected to the Argentine Senate in 1973 and headed the Radical bloc until 1976. Following the fall of the military government, Perette stood as the running mate of Fernando De La Rua on the National Line slate in the internal selections for the 1983 Presidential elections, but they eventually withdrew their candidacy. The eventually successful Radical President Raúl Alfonsín named Perette Ambassador to Uruguay, serving between 1983 and 1989. He refused his vice-presidential and senatorial pensions in protest over the two coups that cut each of those terms short. Carlos Perette died in 1992.

Political offices
Preceded by Alejandro Gómez	Vice President of Argentina; 1963 - 1966	Succeeded by Vicente Solano Lima
