= Jorge Enea Spilimbergo =

Argentine politician and writer

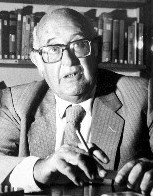
Spilimbergo in 1990

Jorge Enea Spilimbergo (born in La Boca, Buenos Aires, Argentina, on 25 September 1928; died in Buenos Aires on 4 September 2004) was an Argentine nationalist socialist politician, poet, journalist, and writer. He was one of the founders of the Izquierda Nacional party.

Spilimbergo wrote extensively on Latin America, the "semi-colonial world", and Argentina. He wrote on the national question and the inner fabric of alleged imperialist policies, gathered in his The national question in Marx.

He was influenced by such Marxist leaders and theoreticians as Vladimir Lenin, Leon Trotsky, Mao Zedong, Ernesto Guevara and Ho Chi Minh. He wrote on themes of the overthrow of class societies and the passage from the realm of necessity to the realm of liberty.

Spilimbergo worked largely in obscurity as a nonperson, allegedly due to objections from both the political right and the left, including from many Peronists, who objected primarily to his criticisms of the alleged national bourgeois limitations of Peronism.

Spilimbergo died in Buenos Aires on 4 September 2004.
