= Workers' Socialist Party (Argentina) =

Far-left political party in Argentina

Worker's Socialist Party Partido Socialista de los Trabajadores
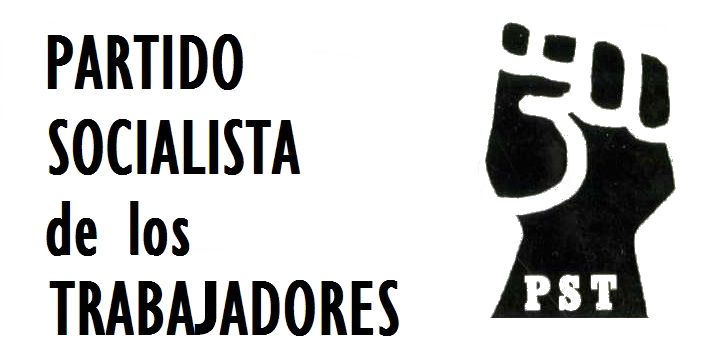
- Abbreviation: PST
- Leader: Nahuel Moreno
- Founded: 1972
- Dissolved: 1982
- Split from: Worker's Revolutionary Party
- Succeeded by: Movement for Socialism
- Headquarters: Buenos Aires, Argentina
- Ideology: Trotskyism; Morenism
- Political position: Far-left
- Colours: Red

The Worker's Socialist Party was a Trotskyist political party in Argentina.

== History ==
In 1965, Nahuel Moreno merged Worker's Word with Mario Santucho's FRIP, resulting in the Worker's Revolutionary Party. After the Cordobazo, Morenists clashed against the Santuchists because of the place industrial workers had in the proletarian revolution. Santucho, leader of the party, declared that the real proletariat was the peasants and not the industrial workers. Moreno and his followers left the party and established the Worker's Socialist Party in 1972.

In 1973, Moreno offered Agustín Tosco to be the presidential candidate for March elections, but he refused. Instead, Juan Carlos Coral ran for President both in March and September, getting 0,62% and 1,54% of the votes respectively.

After the 1976 Coup, the party went underground and was renamed Movement for Socialism.
