= Movimiento de Agrupaciones Obreras =

Argentine political organization

Movimiento de Agrupaciones Obreras ('Workers Groups Movement', abbreviated MAO) was a political labour organization in Argentina. MAO was founded in mid-1957 by a Nahuel Moreno's Trotskyist tendency (which had been organized in the Revolutionary Workers Party, POR, until that party had merged into the Socialist Party of the National Revolution in 1954). MAO formed part of the trade unionist resistance to the Revolución Libertadora.

On July 23, 1957, MAO began publishing the weekly newspaper Palabra Obrera ('Worker's Word'). The organization became commonly known by the name of its publication.

Through MAO, Moreno's group sought to practice entryism in the Peronist movement.

MAO was disbanded in the early 1960s.
