= Francisco Manrique =

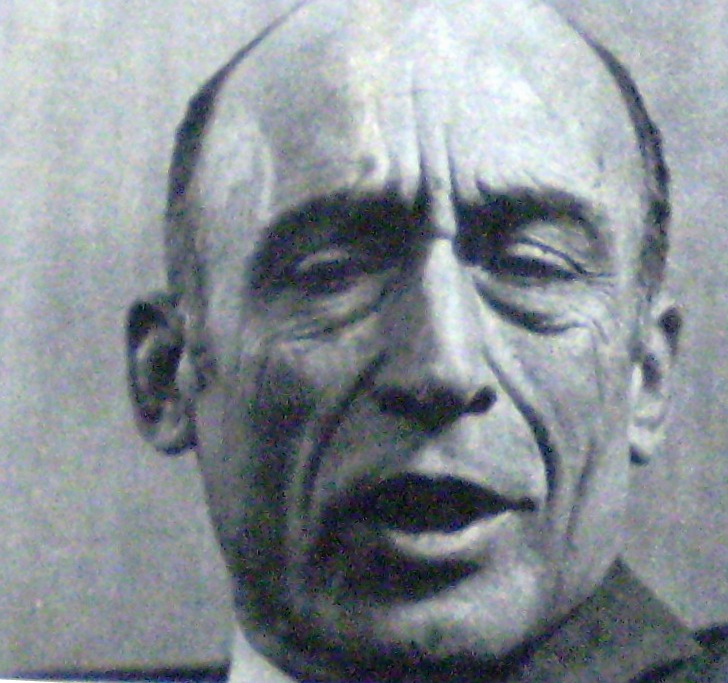

Secretary of Tourism
- In office May 16, 1986 – December 10, 1987
- President: Raúl Alfonsín

Minister of Social Welfare
- In office March 26, 1971 – August 8, 1972
- President: Alejandro Lanusse
- Preceded by: Amadeo Frúgoli
- Succeeded by: Oscar Puiggrós

Personal details
- Born: February 10, 1919 Mendoza, Argentina
- Died: February 15, 1988 (aged 69) Buenos Aires, Argentina
- Spouse(s): Esther Canepa Devoto (1943–77); Cristina Ruíz (1985–88)
- Education: Escuela Naval Militar

Francisco Manrique (February 10, 1919 – February 15, 1988) was an Argentine naval officer, journalist, policy maker and presidential candidate.

== Life and times ==
A native of Mendoza, in western Argentina, Francisco Manrique graduated from the Argentine Naval Academy in 1938 and from the Navy School in 1949. After being jailed as an opponent of President Juan Domingo Perón, he became head of the Casa Militar (the presidential military household) in 1955 following Perón's overthrow. He resigned as part of an effort to have the new military leader, President Eduardo Lonardi, removed, and was reinstated by Lonardi's successor, Pedro Aramburu, upon the former's resignation.

Manrique resigned from the Navy as a captain in 1958 to start a daily newspaper in opposition to President Arturo Frondizi, Correo de la Tarde. Following Frondizi's overthrow in 1962, he lad diplomatic efforts to have other members of the Organization of American States recognize the government of President José María Guido, who had been appointed in Frondizi's stead via the acephaly clause.

Correo de la Tarde failed in 1963, as did his subsequent weekly Leer para Creer. His next undertaking, Correo de la Semana, was more successful. Launched in 1965, it became known for its advocacy for senior citizens. He hosted the television public affairs interview program Comentario Político from 1965 until the show's curtailment by order of hard-line Interior Minister Francisco Imaz.

The head of a military junta at the time, President Alejandro Lanusse appointed Manrique Minister of Social Policy in 1971. In that capacity, he organized a myriad of federal and provincial health insurance programs into the Integrated Medical Attention Plan (PAMI) and housing assistance programs into the National Housing Fund (FONAVI). The reforms helped lead to a marked reduction in infant mortality in Argentina during the 1970s. Manrique ran for President in 1973 as the candidate of the Popular Federalist Alliance, a grouping of small, moderately conservative parties. He won 15% of the vote and placed third in the March 1973 election, the most received by a third-party candidate in Argentina up to then. His first wife, Esther Canepa Devoto, whom he married in 1943 and had three sons and a daughter with, died in 1977, and he married the former Cristina Ruíz in 1985.

Manrique actively supported the March 1976 coup and many of his Federalist Party colleagues were therein appointed to local government posts, including 78 mayors. Following seven years of ruinous military rule, however, elections were called for October 1983. Manrique again ran unsuccessfully for President as the candidate of the center-right Federal Alliance. The winner, Raúl Alfonsín of the centrist UCR, appointed him Secretary of Tourism, a non-Cabinet position in 1986, by which Manrique unsuccessfully proposed the implementation of a tax on tourism abroad. He won election as a legislator in 1987 as a nonpartisan candidate on the UCR ticket. Remaining editor-in-chief of Correo de la Semana, Manrique died in Buenos Aires from complications related to lymphoma, in 1988. He was 69 years old.
