= New National Left =

New National Left (in Spanish: Nueva Izquierda Nacional) was a far-left political party in Spain.

NIN was one of five groups that were registered as political parties by the Ministry of Interior on October 4, 1976, the first to be registered after the abolition of the one-party system.

NIN never attained any major importance. The group is no longer active today.
