= Arturo Umberto Illia =

34th President of Argentina

His Excellency Arturo Illia OLSM, OM
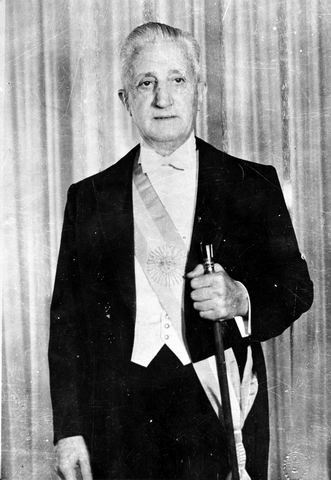
- Official portrait, 1963

34th President of Argentina
- In office 12 October 1963 – 28 June 1966
- Vice President: Carlos Humberto Perette
- Preceded by: José María Guido
- Succeeded by: Juan Carlos Onganía

National Deputy
- In office 20 April 1948 – 30 April 1952
- Constituency: Córdoba

Lieutenant Governor of Córdoba
- In office 17 June 1940 – 19 June 1943
- Governor: Santiago H. del Castillo
- Preceded by: Alejandro Gallardo
- Succeeded by: Asís Ramón

Provincial Senator of Córdoba
- In office 1 May 1936 – 24 April 1940
- Preceded by: Fidel Torres
- Succeeded by: Nicolás Pedernera
- Constituency: Cruz del Eje

Personal details
- Born: Arturo Umberto Illia; 4 August 1900 Pergamino, Buenos Aires, Argentina
- Died: 18 January 1983 (aged 82) Córdoba, Argentina
- Resting place: La Recoleta Cemetery, Buenos Aires
- Party: Radical Civic Union
- Spouse: Silvia Martorell (m. 1939; died 1966)
- Children: Emma Silvia Illia; Martín Arturo Illia; Leandro Hipólito Illia
- Education: University of Buenos Aires
- Arturo Umberto Illia's voice Recorded c. 1963-66

Arturo Umberto Illia (Spanish pronunciation: [aɾˈtuɾo wmˈbeɾto ilˈia]; 4 August 1900 – 18 January 1983) was President of Argentina from 1963 until his overthrow in 1966. He was part of the Radical Civic Union, and the People's Radical Civic Union during his presidency.

Illia reached the presidency of the Nation in elections controlled by the Armed Forces in which Peronism was outlawed and while the previous constitutional president Arturo Frondizi was detained. During his government, the national industry was promoted, 23% of the national budget was allocated to education (the highest figure in the history of the country), unemployment fell, the external debt decreased, a literacy plan was carried out and sanctioned the Minimum, Vital and Mobile Salary law and the Medications Laws.

He was noted for his honesty and trustworthiness, an example of this being the fact that Illia lived almost all his life in his humble home in Cruz del Eje, where he devoted himself to medicine, and that he never used his influence to his advantage, to the point such as having to sell his car while in office and refusing to use public funds to finance his medical treatments. After his government, he maintained his active political militancy, rejected the retirement perks he had earned as president, and returned home to continue dedicating himself to medicine.

== Biography ==
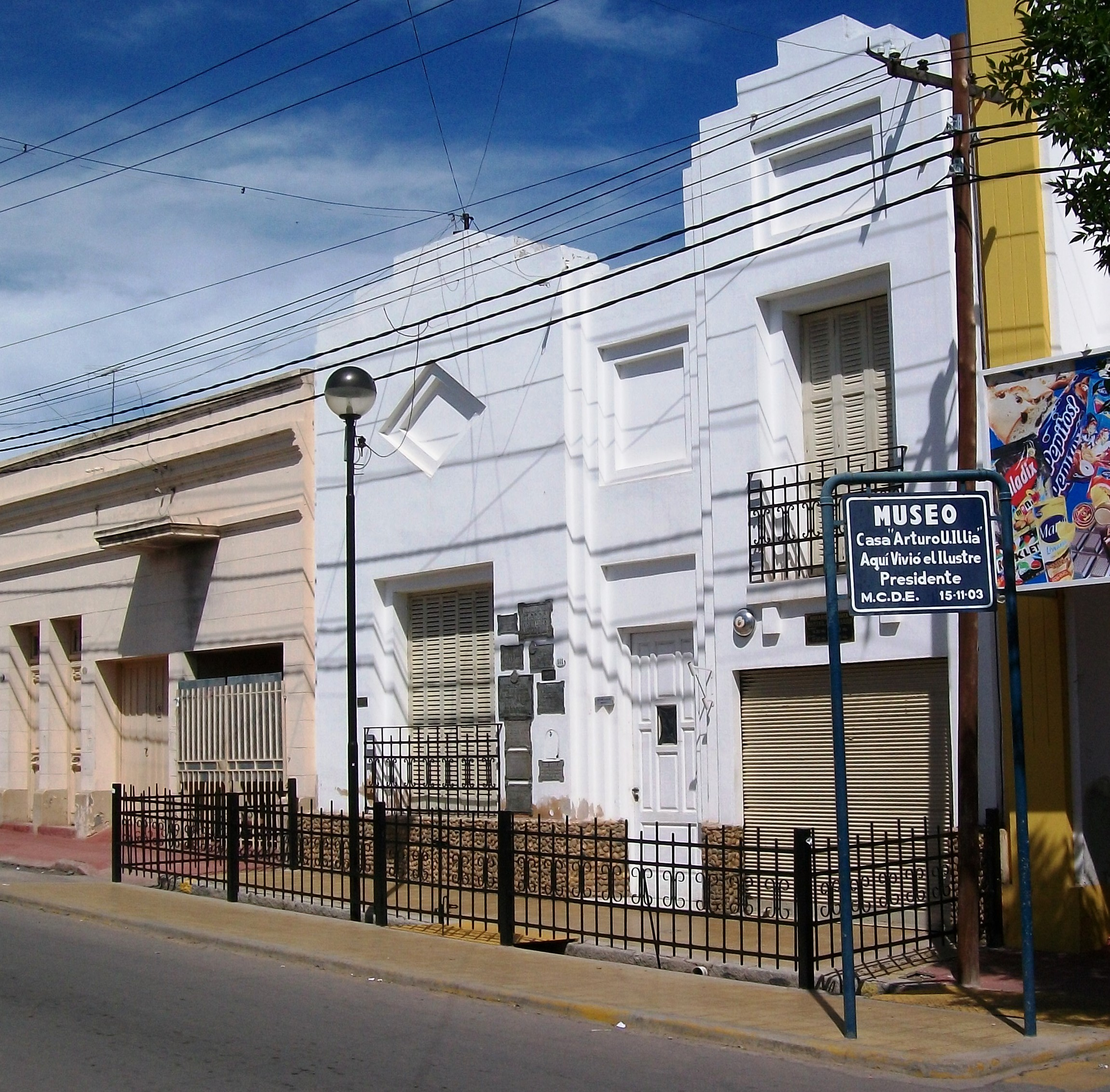
House in Cruz del Eje, in the Córdoba province, where Illia worked as a doctor for 30 years, today a museum.

Arturo Umberto Illia was born in Pergamino, Buenos Aires. He enrolled in the School of Medicine at the University of Buenos Aires in 1918. That year, he joined the movement for University reform in Argentina (Reforma Universitaria), which first emerged in the city of Córdoba, and set the basis for a free, open and public university system less influenced by the Catholic Church. This development changing the concept and administration of higher education in Argentina, and in a good portion of Latin America.

As a part of his medical studies, Illia begun working in the San Juan de Dios Hospital in the city of La Plata, obtaining his degree in 1927.

In 1928 he had an interview with President Hipólito Yrigoyen, the longtime leader of the centrist UCR, and the first freely-elected President of Argentina. Illia offered him his services as a physician, and Yrigoyen, in turn, offered him a post as railroad physician in different parts of the country, upon which Illia decided to move to scenic Cruz del Eje, in Cordoba Province. He worked there as a physician from 1929 until 1963, except for three years (1940–1943) in which he was vice-governor of the province.

=== Family ===
On 15 February 1939, he married Silvia Elvira Martorell, and had three children: Emma Silvia, Martín Arturo and Leandro Hipólito. Martín Illia was elected to Congress in 1995, and served until his death in 1999.

Gabriela Michetti, elected vice president in 2015, is a great-grandniece of Illia.

== Political activities ==
Arturo Illia became a member of the Radical Civic Union when he reached adulthood, in 1918, under the strong influence of the radical militancy of his father and of his brother, Italo. That same year, he began his university studies, with the events of the aforementioned Universitarian Reform taking place in the country.

From 1929 onwards, after moving to Cruz del Eje, he began intense political activity, which he alternated with his professional life. In 1935 he was elected Provincial Senator for the Department of Cruz del Eje, in the elections that took place on 17 November. In the Provincial Senate, he actively participated in the approval of the Law of Agrarian Reform, which was passed in the Córdoba Legislature but rejected in the National Congress.

He was also head of the Budget and Treasury Commission, and pressed for the construction of dams, namely Nuevo San Roque, La Viña, Cruz del Eje and Los Alazanes.

In the elections that took place on 10 March 1940, he was elected Vice-Governor of Córdoba Province, with Santiago del Castillo, who became governor. He occupied this post until the provincial government was replaced by the newly installed dictatorship of General Pedro Ramírez, in 1943.

From 1948 to 1952, Illia served in the Argentine Chamber of Deputies and frequently spoke out against the Peronist regime. Working in a Congress dominated by the Peronist Party, he took an active part in the Public Works, Hygiene and Medical Assistance Commissions.

== Election as President of Argentina ==
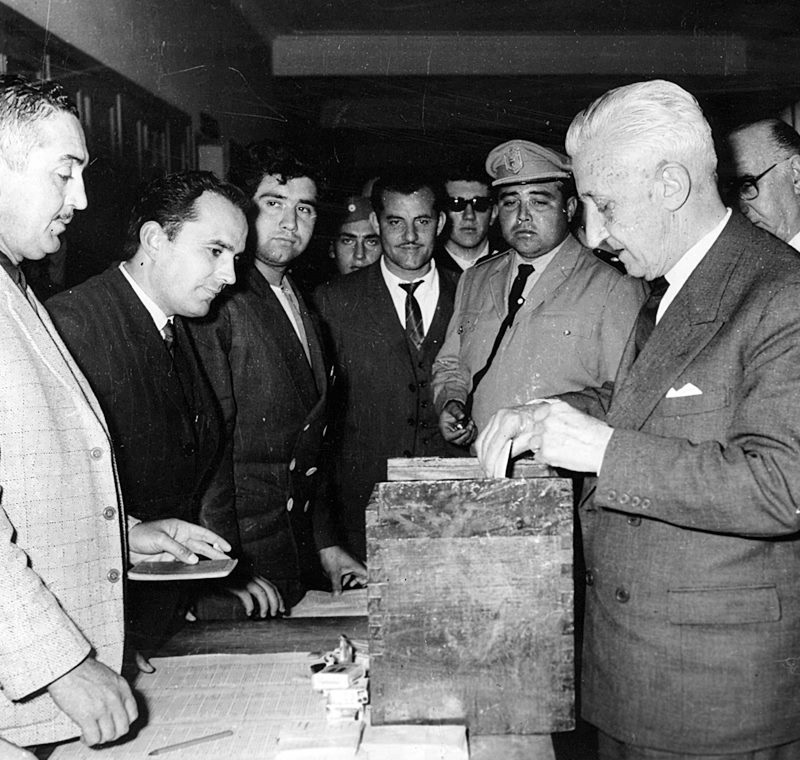
Illia voting in 1963.

The election held on 7 July 1963 marked a return to constitutional government in Argentina after a period of political instability and internal strife following the military overthrow of President Arturo Frondizi on 29 March 1962.

=== Provisional administration ===
Illia's predecessor, José María Guido, was installed as head of a nominally civilian administration when Frondizi was deposed. A "virtual captive" of the armed forces during his nineteen months in office, Guido dissolved Congress and annulled the results of the March 1962 mid-term election that had seen Peronists sweep 45 of the 95 Chamber of Deputies seats and 10 of the 14 governorships at stake. However, Guido succeeded in his top priority of convincing military leaders to allow the 1963 elections.

=== Military ===
The 1963 elections were made possible due to support from the moderate "Blue" faction (Azules in Spanish) of the Argentine military led by the head of the Joint Chiefs, General Juan Carlos Onganía and by the Internal Affairs Minister, General Osiris Villegas. The Azules defeated an attempted revolt in late 1962 and early 1963 by the rival "Red" faction (Colorados in Spanish), which consisted of hard-liners who favored a military dictatorship.

=== Ban on Peronism ===
Like in most elections after 1955, Peronists were banned from running in the 1963 election.

=== Divisions within the Radical Party ===
The UCR had been divided since their contentious 1956 convention into the mainstream "People's UCR" (UCRP) and the center-left UCRI. The leader of the UCRP, Ricardo Balbín, withdrew his name from the 10 March nominating convention and instead supported a less conservative, less anti-Peronist choice, and the party nominated Dr. Illia for president and Entre Ríos Province lawyer Carlos Perette as his running-mate.

=== Election results ===
In the electoral college on 31 July 1963, the Illia-Perette ticket obtained 169 votes out of 476 on the first round of voting (70 short of an absolute majority), but the support of three centrist parties on the second round gave them 270 votes, thus formalizing their election.

Illia assumed the presidency on 12 October 1963.

== Presidency ==
=== 1963 general election ===
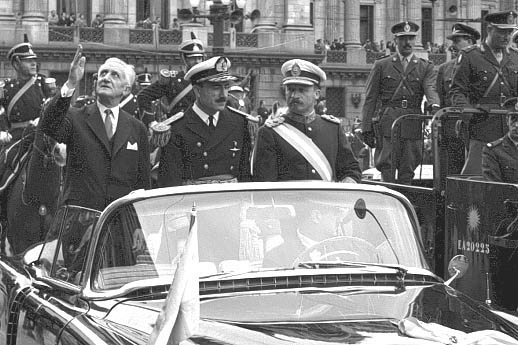
Illia and Ongania after assuming the presidency.

Arturo Illia became president on 12 October 1963, and promptly steered a moderate political course, while remaining mindful of the spectre of a coup d'état. A UCRP majority in the Senate contrasted with their 73 seats in the 192-seat Lower House, a disadvantage complicated by Illia's refusal to include UCRI men in the cabinet (which, save for Internal Affairs Minister Juan Palmero, would all be figures close to Balbín). Illia also refused military requests to have a general put in charge of the Federal District Police, though he confirmed Onganía as head of the Joint Chiefs of Staff and named numerous "Blue" generals to key posts.

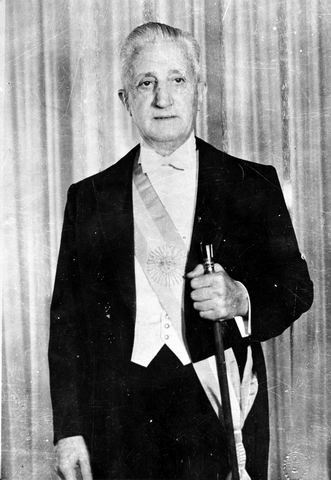
Arturo Illia with the presidential sash.

Illia started his presidency with an attempt to promote reconciliation and stability. His inaugural address included both praise for the armed forces and a call to reduce poverty and income inequality, citing encyclicals issued by then-Pope John XIII, Mater et Magistra and Pacem in Terris. Countering military objections, however, he made political rights an early policy centerpiece with an emphasis on constitutionality. His first act consisted in eliminating all restrictions over Peronism and its allied political parties, causing anger and surprise among the military (particularly the right-wing "Red" faction). Political demonstrations from the Peronist party were forbidden after the 1955 coup, by the Presidential Decree 4161/56, however, five days after Illia's inaugural, a Peronist commemorative act for the 17 October (in honor of the date in 1945 when labor demonstrations propelled Perón to power) took place in Buenos Aires' Plaza Miserere without any official restrictions.

Illia similarly lifted electoral restrictions, allowing the participation of Peronists in the 1965 legislative elections. The prohibition over the Communist Party of Argentina and the pro-industry MID (which many in the military, then controlled by cattle barons, termed "economic criminals") was also lifted. Among Illia's early landmark legislation was an April 1964 bill issuing felony penalties for discrimination and racial violence, which he presented in an address to a joint session of Congress.

Domestically, Illia pursued a pragmatic course, restoring Frondizi's vigorous public works and lending policies, but with more emphasis on the social aspect and with a marked, nationalist shift away from Frondizi's support for foreign investment. This shift was most dramatic in Illia's controversial petroleum policy.

Yet Illia struggled to reconcile the adversarial social forces that prevailed in Argentina during his term. The UCRP was unable to broaden its electoral base beyond its core middle-class constituency, which left the most powerful interest groups – Peronists, the military, and business leaders – excluded from formal sources of political authority. Illia refused to give the military a direct role in government, which he viewed as a violation of constitutional legality. Meanwhile, Illia's reluctance to engage in the clientelism that characterized Argentine politics left him isolated even within his own party. The newspaper La Nación would later write of his presidency, "It is not easy to find a president more denigrated and attacked during the exercise of power than Arturo Umberto Illia. Until the end, he remained calm and prudent in governing an intense country."

=== Economic record ===
Under the preceding Guido administration, Argentina had endured a sharp two-year recession under an orthodox stabilization program. Once in office, Illia implemented a pro-growth policy characterized by expansionary fiscal and monetary policy and deepening of import substituting industrialization. The result was a strong recovery with annual real GDP growth of nearly 10% in both 1964 and 1965, record agricultural exports, and double-digit growth in manufacturing output. However, Illia's opponents credited the boom to record harvests and therefore a "turn of good luck, thanks to the gods or to the pampas." Illia's administration moreover made limited progress in resolving labor unrest, persistent inflation, and foreign exchange shortages – all of which remain challenges for Argentina today. By the time Illia was removed from office in mid-1966, economic stagnation had returned.

==== Economic policy ====
Opponents characterized Illia's administration as a "do-nothing regime."

With a full term in office, Illia might have made more progress in improving Argentina's economic fundamentals. His administration's five-year National Development Plan was released in 1965 and was received favorably by economists and foreign officials. However, Illia's emphasis on compromise and gradualism frustrated business and military leaders who perceived an urgent need for more drastic restructuring and modernization of the economy.

==== Industrial expansion ====
Industrial production grew by 18.7% in 1964 and 13.8% in 1965, led by capital intensive sectors such as steel, plastics, and chemicals. Motor vehicle production, which increased from 105,000 units in 1963 to 195,000 in 1965, became a highly visible symbol of Argentina's industrialization.

==== Agriculture ====
Agriculture returned to growth after two decades of stagnation. Cereals production and cattle stock increased by 60% and 25% respectively between 1963 and 1965, the result of substantial investment after 1955 by the private sector in tractors, irrigation systems, and storage facilities, and by the government in public research and extension services. With favorable prices on world markets in the mid-1960s, Argentina's exports reached new records, rising from an average of US$950 million between 1954 and 1961 to US$1.6 billion by 1966.

=== Fiscal policy ===
Illia maintained the expansionary fiscal policy that dated back to the Perón administration. The budget deficit increased by 60% in 1964 to 5.8% of GDP due to his freezing of public utility rates, which reduced government revenue in real terms. Limited progress was made to balance the budget in 1965 with a fiscal deficit of 3.8% of GDP; a steep increase in tax revenue due to the economic recovery and elimination of many tax deductions was more than offset by increased social security benefits and a 50% wage increase for public sector employees.

Losses at state-owned companies remained a burden on public finances despite Illia's creation of the Syndicate of State Businesses to encourage efficiency in state-owned companies. The annual subsidy to cover losses at the national railway company accounted for almost 20% of central government expenditures in 1965. Government procurement costs increased due to legislation passed by Illia's administration that gave preferential status to domestic vendors in public contracts; by the late 1980s, Argentina's Ministry of Public Works found that this system resulted in an additional US$2 billion in spending per year.

Deteriorating provincial finances similarly consumed a growing proportion of central government resources. Transfers to provincial governments represented 22% of central government revenue in 1964 vs. less than 15% in the mid-1950s.

With the government avoiding additional foreign debt, the fiscal deficit was financed primarily by printing money. The money supply grew by 61% during Illia's first 18 months in office alone, contributing to an inflation rate that averaged 25% per year during his presidency.

=== Foreign trade and balance of payments ===
Due to record agricultural exports, Argentina enjoyed a substantial current account surplus during Illia's presidency. The country penetrated new markets such as Italy, Japan, and the Eastern Bloc, and started exporting industrial products, including a small but symbolically important number of motor vehicles to Paraguay, Ecuador, and Guatemala. Illia promoted regional integration with Latin American Free Trade Association (LAFTA) members, issuing Decree 1188 in February 1965 to allow increased imports of auto parts in exchange for compensatory exports to the same countries.

However, Argentina's balance of payments were burdened by the country's external debt. Although Illia reduced external debt from US$3.4 billion to US$2.7 billion, annual servicing costs remained high and were equivalent to 40% of annual exports. Scheduled repayments caused Argentina's foreign reserves to fall from US$280 million in 1963 to only US$70 million in 1965, requiring negotiations with the Paris Club group of creditors to refinance and defer payments. Resolution of Argentina's balance of payments issues were complicated by Illia's strained relationship with the International Monetary Fund and the World Bank. During his election campaign, Illia had denounced the IMF in particular as an economic intruder and refused a meeting with IMF officials upon assuming office.

Relations with the Inter-American Development Bank were more constructive. The Inter-American Development Bank granted Illia's government a US$92.6 million credit for development and educational projects shortly after his inauguration in October 1963, and in early 1965 the Bank approved US$30 million in funding for Argentine industry.

The expansion of heavy industry during Illia's time in office, while impressive at face value, created new burdens on Argentina's balance of payments. Import substitution in many cases simply replaced imports of finished goods with imports of capital and intermediate goods. Foreign direct investment brought an influx of external capital (although frequently in the form of second-hand equipment rather than cash investment), technology, and know-how, but subsequently led to capital outflows (profit repatriation, transfer pricing, and royalty payments) from Argentine subsidiaries to U.S. and European parent companies. As result, the Central Bank of Argentina in 1965 estimated that the motor vehicle industry imposed a foreign exchange burden of US$200 million per year.

Illia's administration therefore maintained Argentina's current account surplus through strict controls on imports, which had a negative impact on capital investment. By 1965, imports of capital goods had fallen to only a quarter of the level seen during the 1960-1961 investment boom under Frondizi. Given the constant pressures on the country's balance of payments, Illia's administration tightly controlled access to foreign currency, required exporters to convert their earnings into pesos, and introduced measures to prevent capital flight. Yet Illia's exchange rate policy was significantly more flexible than in prior administrations with a "crawling peg" exchange rate that devalued the peso in line with inflation, preventing the overvalued currency that had resulted in prior administrations that used a fixed exchange rate regime.

=== Petroleum policy ===
Illia's economic record was strongly impacted by his petroleum policy. During his presidential campaign, Arturo Illia promised to dissolve both the Investment Guarantee Agreement, as well as the oil contracts that were made during the Arturo Frondizi government without complying with legal regulations. Once in power, Illia announced that contracts that had been made illegally would be annulled, on 15 November 1963, Illia issued the decrees 744/63 and 745/63, which rendered said oil contracts null and void, for being considered "illegitimate and harmful to the rights and interests of the Nation."

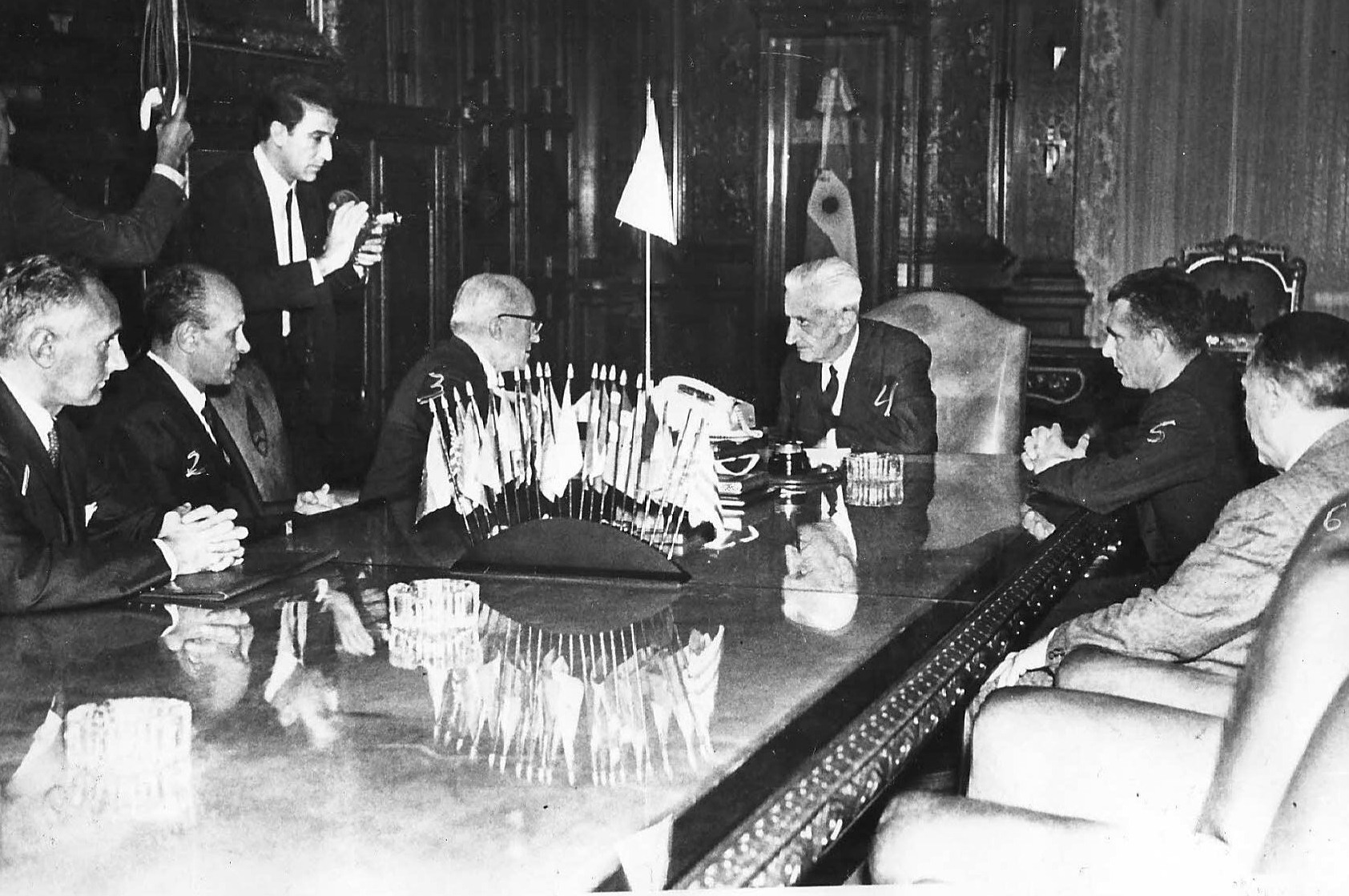
Illia with Agostino Rocca.

Frondizi had begun, during his 1958–62 presidency, a policy of oil exploration based on concessions of oil wells to foreign private corporations, leaving the state oil company Yacimientos Petrolíferos Fiscales (YPF) the sole responsibility of exploration and buying oil from private extractors. Arguing that such contracts were negative for the Argentine state and its people (YPF had to assume all the risks of investing in exploration of new wells, the price of oil had risen steadily since the contracts were negotiated, etc.), Illia denounced the Frondizi policy as negative for national Argentine interests, and promised to render the contracts of concession void, renegotiating them.

Although popular with the Argentine public, Illia's petroleum policy created headwinds for the economy and balance of payments. Under Frondizi, oil production had tripled between 1958 and 1962, resulting in self-sufficiency in oil by the end of his administration. However, production stagnated under Illia and oil imports resumed. The annulment of oil contracts created tensions with the United States, which placed a hold on Argentina's requests for multilateral assistance, including financing for aircraft imports, housing, and agricultural equipment. As a result, American aid to Argentina decreased from US$135 million in 1963 to only US$21 million in 1964, depriving the country of a critical source of foreign currency.

=== Labor policy ===
On 15 June 1964, the Law 16.459 was passed, establishing a minimum wage for the country. "Avoiding the exploitation of workers in those sectors in which an excess of workforce may exist", "Securing an adequate minimum wage" and "Improving the income of the poorest workers" were listed among the objectives of the project. With the same aims, the Law of Supplies was passed, destined to control prices of basic foodstuffs and setting minimum standards for pensions.

Since Perón's exile, the labor movement functioned as the representation of Peronism in the country. Led by the leader of the powerful metalworkers' union UOM, Augusto Vandor, the unions deployed a large-scale "Plan de Lucha" (Plan of Struggle). Between May and July 1964, 3.9 million workers occupied more than 11,000 industrial establishments. Given his sympathy for the working class, Illia refrained from using force to expel the occupiers, leading to charges from the business establishment of leniency toward the labor movement.

Workers benefitted from a rising standard of living during Illia's administration. Median real wages grew by 9.6% during 1964 alone, and had expanded by almost 25% by the time of the coup. Unemployment declined from 8.8% in 1963 to 4.6% by the end of 1965.

=== Social welfare policy ===
Illia modestly expanded Argentina's welfare state. The most significant program was the increase in value and coverage of family allowances. The government also opened approximately 250 maternal and infant health care centers and started planning for the Villa Lugano public housing development to replace what was then one of the largest villa miseria slums in Buenos Aires.

=== Education policy ===
During Illia's government, education acquired an important presence in the national budget. In 1963, it represented 12% of the budget, rising to 17% in 1964 and to 23% in 1965. On 5 November 1964, the National Literacy Plan was started, with the purpose of diminishing and eliminating illiteracy (At the time, nearly 10% of the adult population was still illiterate). By June 1965, the program comprised 12,500 educational centers and was assisting more than 350,000 adults of all ages.

=== Medical drugs law ===
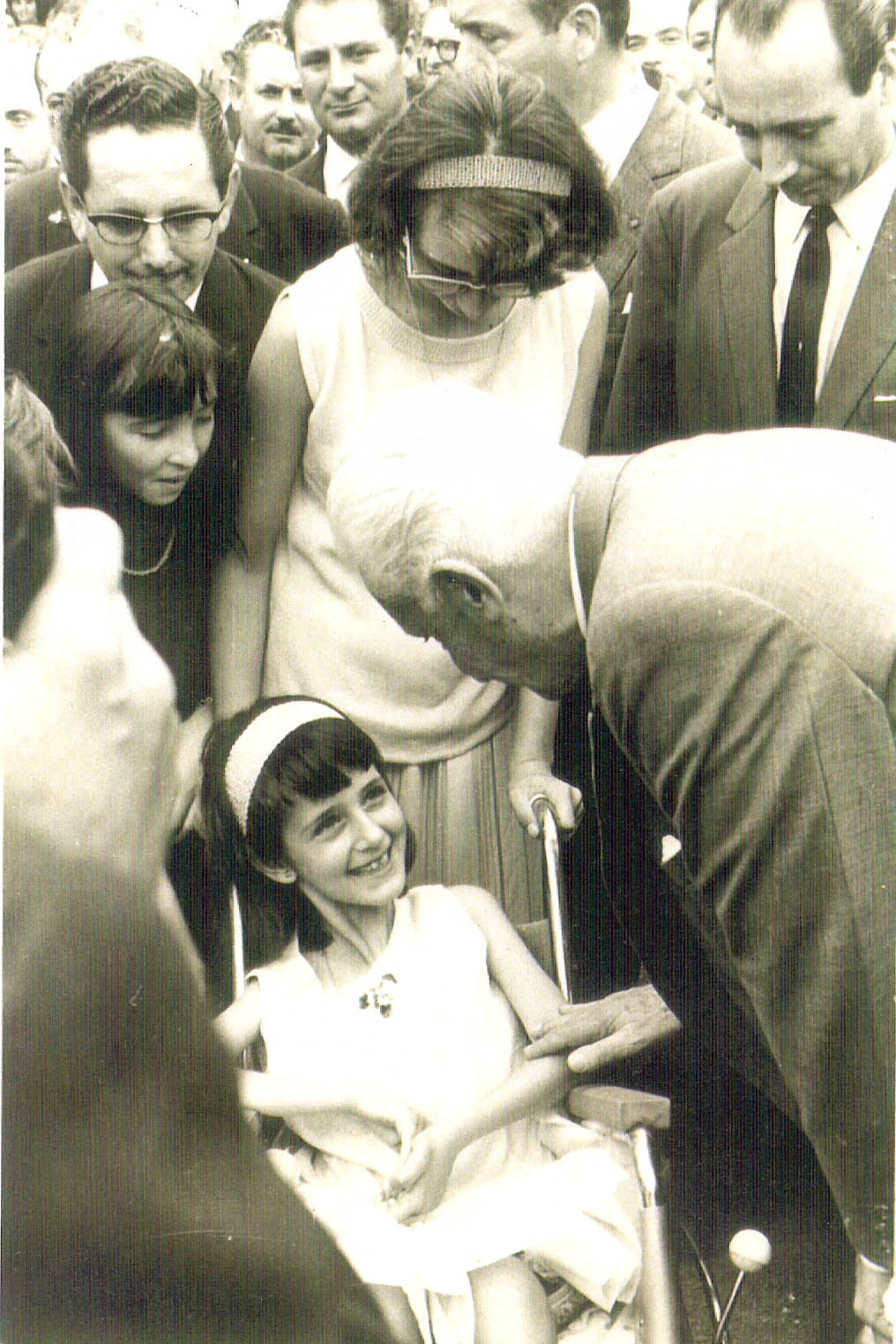
Illia with Adrianita Taddey.

Law 16.462, also known as 'Oñativia Law' (in honor of Minister of Health Arturo Oñativia), was passed on 28 August 1964. It established a policy of price and quality controls for pharmaceuticals, freezing prices for patented medicines at the end of 1963, establishing limits to advertising expenditures and to money sent outside the country for royalties and related payments. The regulation of this law by Decree 3042/65 also required pharmaceutical corporations to present to a judge an analysis of the costs of their drugs and to formalize all their existing contracts.

=== Foreign policy ===
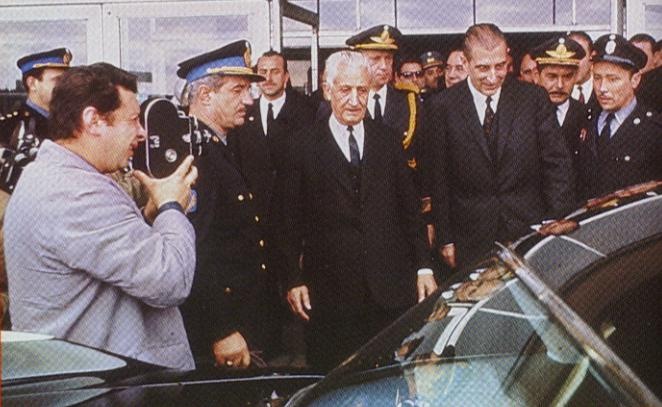
Illia with the Chilean president, Eduardo Frei Montalva in Mendoza.

Argentine foreign policy under Illia was nationalistic and marked by solidarity with nonaligned countries. Relations with the U.S. were frosty due to Illia's petroleum policy and refusal to send troops to support U.S. President Lyndon Johnson's military intervention in the Dominican Republic in 1965. However, Illia sided with the U.S. in supporting sanctions against Cuba over the objections of Mexico, Uruguay, Bolivia, and Chile at the American Foreign Ministers meeting in Washington, D.C. in July 1964. Illia also sought and received U.S. military aid to quell Cuban-backed guerilla forces in the province of Salta.

Relations with Chile deteriorated under Illia after a tentative rapprochement under Frondizi, who had entered an agreement with then Chilean President Jorge Alessandri in 1959 to increase economic and political integration between the two countries and to use arbitration rather than military conflict to resolve recurring border issues. Illia at first alternated between border incidents and declarations of peaceful intent until he annulled the Frondizi-Alessandri agreements in 1965.

Illia's approach to foreign policy combined the old Yrigoyen tradition of Krausist idealism with universalism. The first component was evidenced in the constant references of Illia and his foreign minister Miguel Angel Zavala Ortiz to a peaceful universal order, based on justice and not on the realistic criterion of the balance of power, and Americanism. In turn, the developmental component appeared in their references to the importance of the Alliance for Progress, the need to achieve integration and development at the national and continental level, and the inequality of economic opportunities between developed countries and developing countries as the main cause of global conflict.

Illia pronounced on 12 October 1963 -day of his assumption- before the Legislative Assembly: "Peace no longer consists only in the balance of power of the great powers but also in giving the undeveloped nations the opportunities and the means to eliminate the tremendous humiliation of their inequality and the misery in which their inhabitants live. To universalize peace, progress and well-being must be universalized. America cannot be solely a geographical nomenclature, but must be an active oriented and guiding unit, complementary to a universal order."

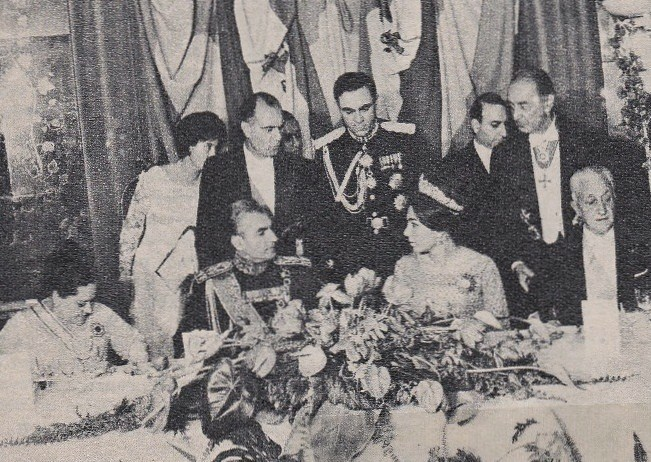
Arturo Illia and Silvia Martorell with the Shah and the Queen consort of Iran.

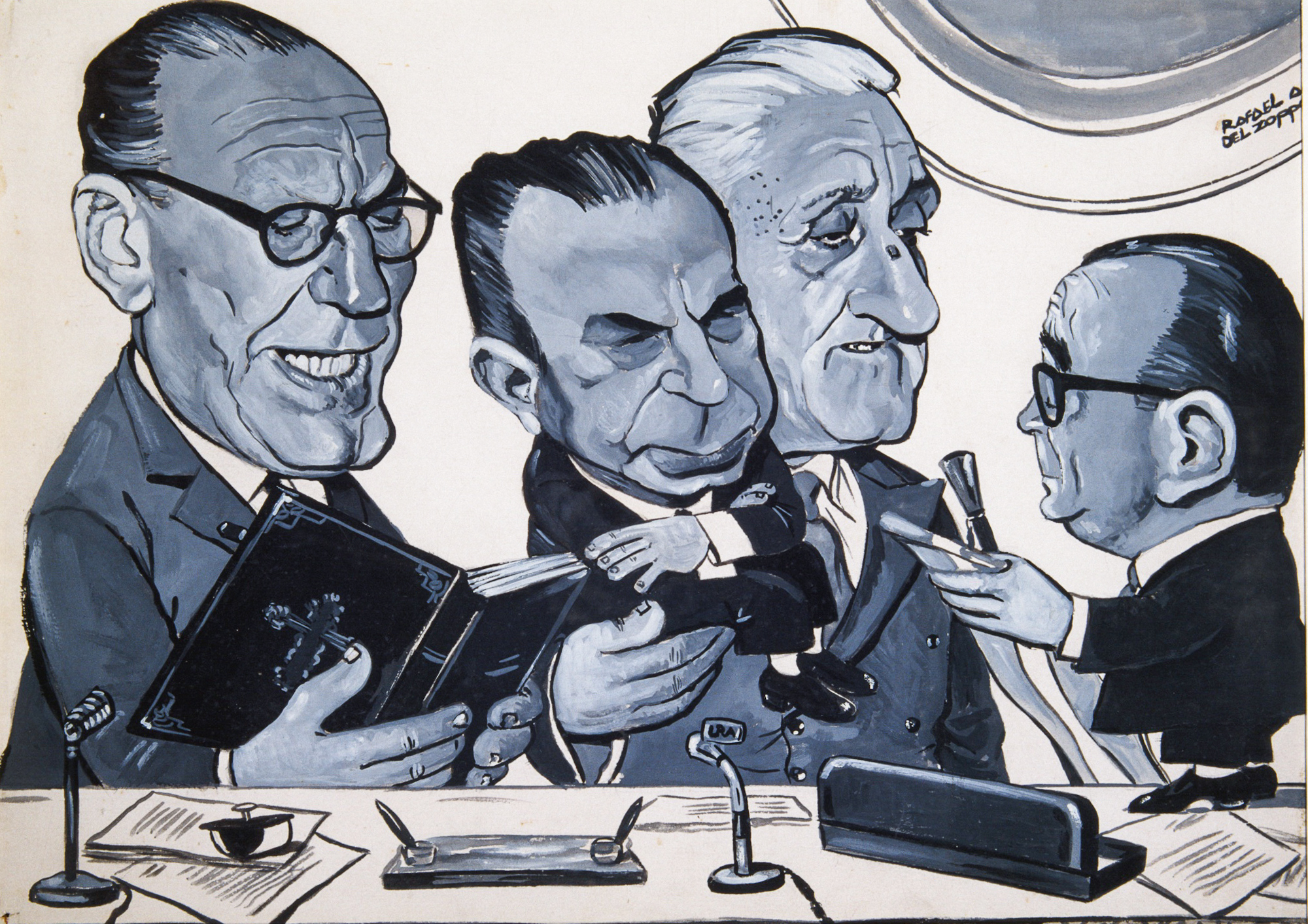
Caricature of the presidential assumption of illia.

During his government Illia revived the state visit of Charles de Gaulle, Giuseppe Saragat, Eduardo Frei Montalva, Mohammad Reza Pahlavi, Princess Margrethe, among others.

=== Public image and the media ===
In this climate of democratic fragility, the press mounted an active campaign that contributed to the military coup. They accused the president of being slow and ineffective, they represented him as a turtle or with a dove on his head; at the same time they argued that modernization required overcoming Argentina's fractious Congress and portrayed Juan Carlos Onganía as a messianic leader who would bring order.

A campaign against Illia was systematically carried out by Peronist journalists and press groups that supported former populist president Peron, who had been deposed and was currently in exile, and sought to bring him back to power. The defamatory push was spearhead by as Mariano Grondona in Primera Plana, a right-wing Peronist publication. Illia was often portrayed as a turtle and characterized as timid and lacking energy. Protestors reportedly released 200 tortoises in downtown Buenos Aires with the slogan "Long Live the Government" on their backs, to which Illia is said to have responded: "Turtle? Fine. Slow but sure."

Simultaneously, the personality of military chiefs was highlighted, particularly Juan Carlos Onganía, contrasting him with the image of politicians, encouraging their intervention to "safeguard the Homeland."

A coup was not only supported by the more conservative sectors, that where aligned with the military, but also by the Peronist movement led by the Justicialist Party along several aligned trade union.

=== March 1965 Congressional elections ===
With 99 of the 192 seats in Argentina's Chamber of Deputies up for re-election in March 1965, Illia permitted Peronists under the Unión Popular party to participate in federal elections for the first time since 1954. Illia also tolerated a Peronist political rally two nights before the election. The Union Popular won 31% of the vote with various neo-Peronist candidates winning an additional 7%. The strong Peronist electoral performance emboldened Illia's critics who were concerned that he would allow the Peronist party, or even Peron himself, to participate in the 1969 Presidential election.

Yet the political landscape was not entirely favorable towards the Peronists due to the divide between the Unión Popular and neo-Peronists. In the gubernatorial election for the province of Mendoza in April 1966, a conservative candidate won the governorship since Peronists and neo-Peronists presented competing lists, losing the election despite collectively winning a majority of the vote.

In some ways the 1965 Congressional election can be viewed as a political victory for Illia. Although Illia's UCRP lost three seats, its vote share increased to 30% from 25% in the 1963 Presidential election, winning converts primarily from the UDELPA, Progressive Democrat, and Democratic Socialist parties. Most of all, Illia succeeded in conducting a free and fair election with Peronist participation and survival of his constitutional government in spite of strong opposition by the military.

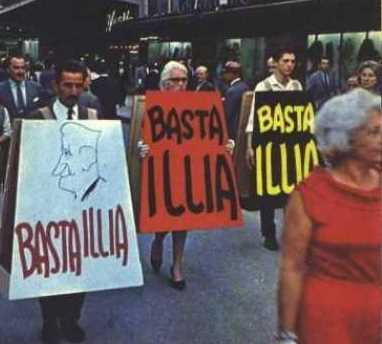
Protest against Illia.

=== June 1966 coup ===
Rumors of an impending military coup increased in early 1966 as Illia's control over his government grew tenuous. The upcoming coup was openly discussed – including logistical plans and even potential dates – in Argentine media, which tended to exaggerate the prospect of social disorder and gave a platform for military leaders to express contempt for Illia. Illia was increasingly unable to secure legislative support; for example, Congress refused to approve his 1966 budget at the time of the coup for a fiscal year that started in January. Meanwhile, a return to economic stagnation in 1966 (real GDP growth would be only 0.6% for the full year) after the 1964-1965 boom led to popular discontent with Illia's government.

On 28 June 1966, on a cold winter morning, the military coup took place amid the indifference of the citizens. The military forced Arturo Illia to abandon the presidency and took power again.

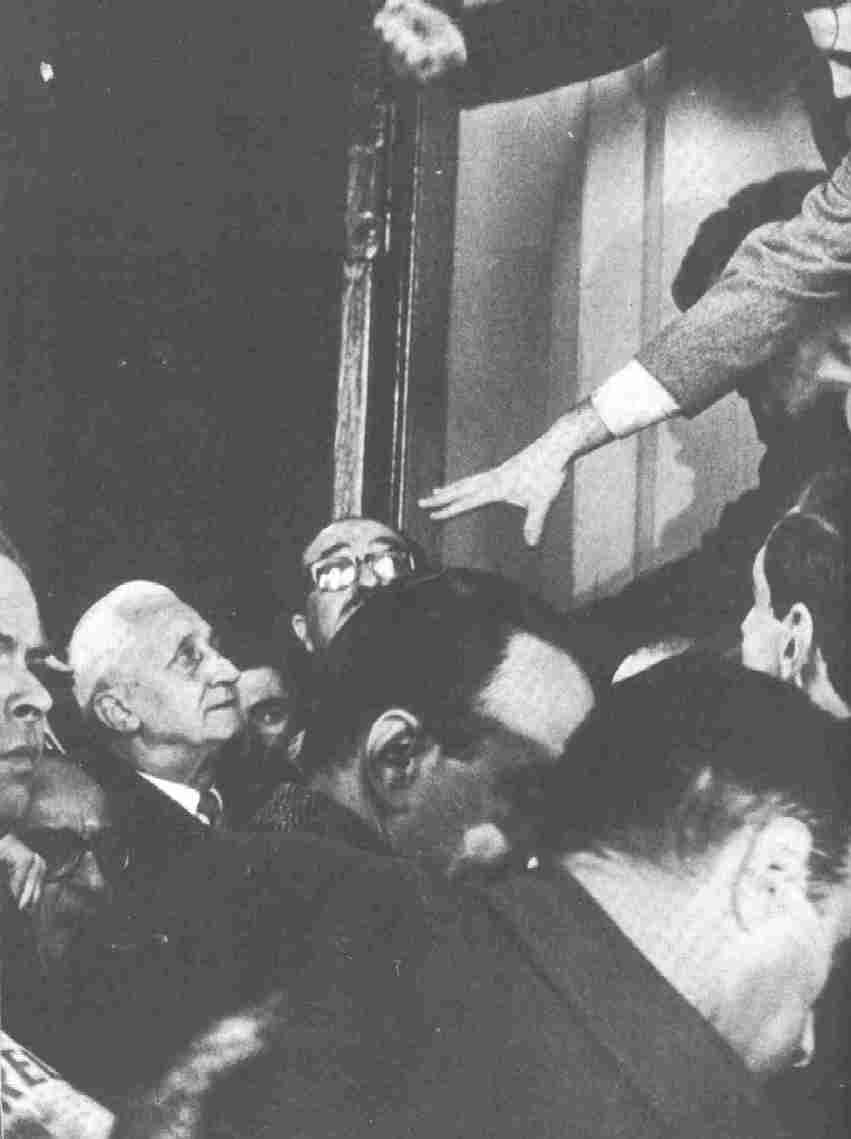
Illia leaving the Casa Rosada.

General Julio Rodolfo Alsogaray, Brigadier Rodolfo Pío Otero —head of the Casa Rosada Military House—, Colonel Luis Perlinger and a group of officers appeared at the presidential office to request that he leave the Government House, assuring him at all times their physical integrity. He flatly refused and after a heated discussion he told them: "I am the commander in chief of the Armed Forces," causing the military to leave the office. Faced with the strong refusal, the police officers entered with gas launchers, while the troops completely surrounded the Casa Rosada. Perlinger again asked the president to leave, assuring him that otherwise "he could not guarantee the safety of the people who accompanied him." Finally, Illia chose to leave the place.

Surrounded by his collaborators, he went down the stairs to the ground floor, crossed the entrance and went to the street, he was able to reach the exit door of the Government House surrounded by a lot of people who kept shouting ... They offered him a car of the presidency, but rejected it. At that he saw the one who had been his Minister of Education, Alconada Aramburú, approaching among the people and telling him to go with him. She followed him and they got into his car. Inside were seven people. Thus we got to his brother's house in the Buenos Aires town of Martínez. The following day, General Juan Carlos Onganía took office, calling the coup the Argentine Revolution.

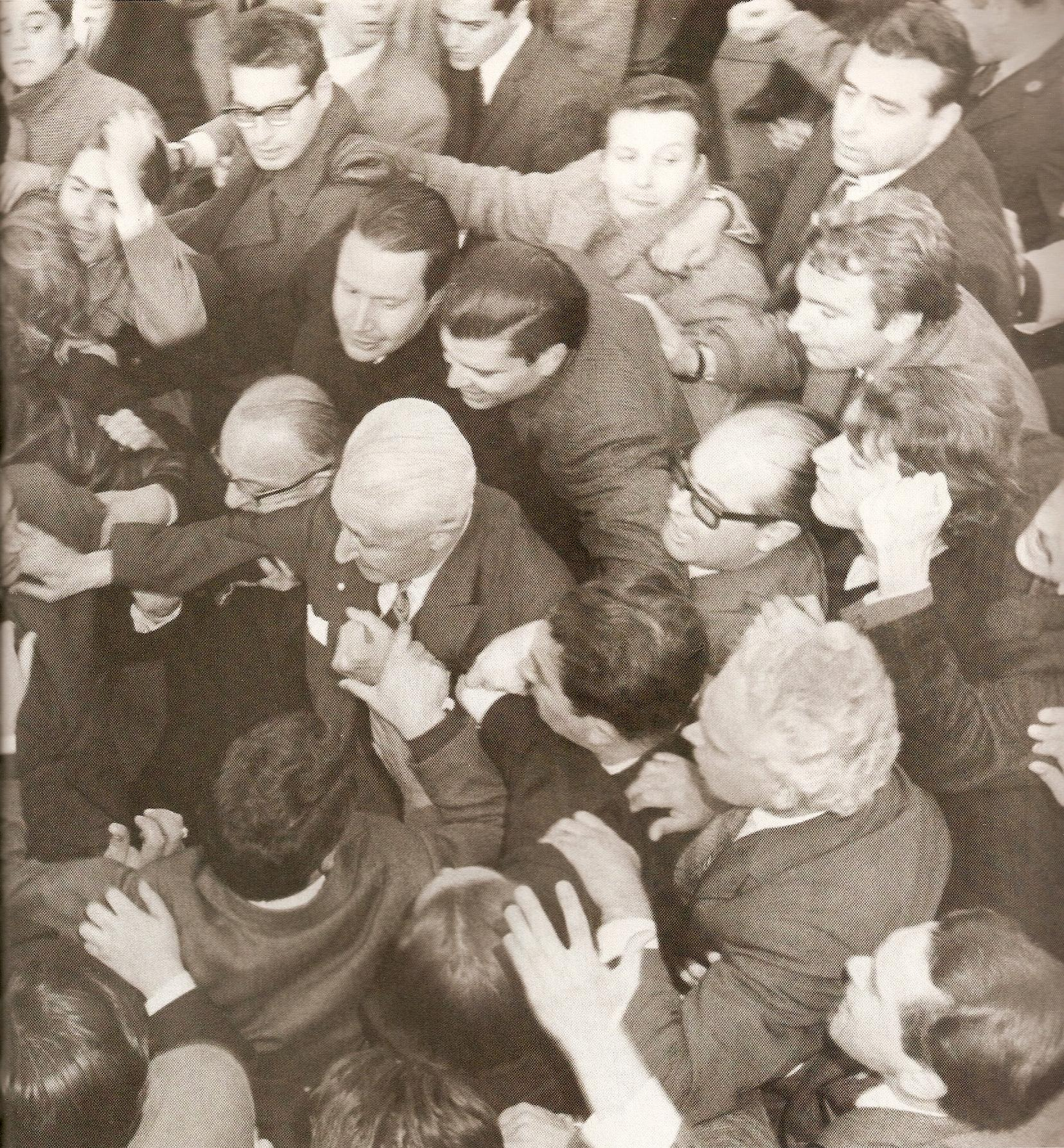
Illia leaving Government House amid a crowd.

=== Cabinet ===
Throughout his presidency he held the same cabinet members, except for Eugenio Blanco, who died in office, and had to be replaced by Juan Carlos Pugliese in August 1964.

Office	Holder	Term
President	Arturo Illia	12 October 1963 – 28 June 1966
Vice President	Carlos Perette	12 October 1963 – 28 June 1966
Ministry of Foreign Affairs	Miguel Ángel Zavala Ortíz	12 October 1963 – 28 June 1966
Ministry of Economics	Eugenio Blanco	12 October 1963 – 4 August 1964
	Juan Carlos Pugliese	4 August 1964 – 28 June 1966
Ministry of Defense	Leopoldo Suárez	12 October 1963 – 28 June 1966
Ministry of the Interior	Juan S. Palmero	12 October 1963 – 28 June 1966
Ministry of Education and Culture	Carlos Alconada Aramburu	12 October 1963 – 28 June 1966
Ministry of Social Assistance and Public Health	Arturo Oñativia	12 October 1963 – 28 June 1966
Ministry of Public Services	Miguel Angel Ferrando	12 October 1963 – 28 June 1966
Ministry of Work and Social Security	Fernando Solá	12 October 1963 – 28 June 1966

== Subsequent activity and death ==
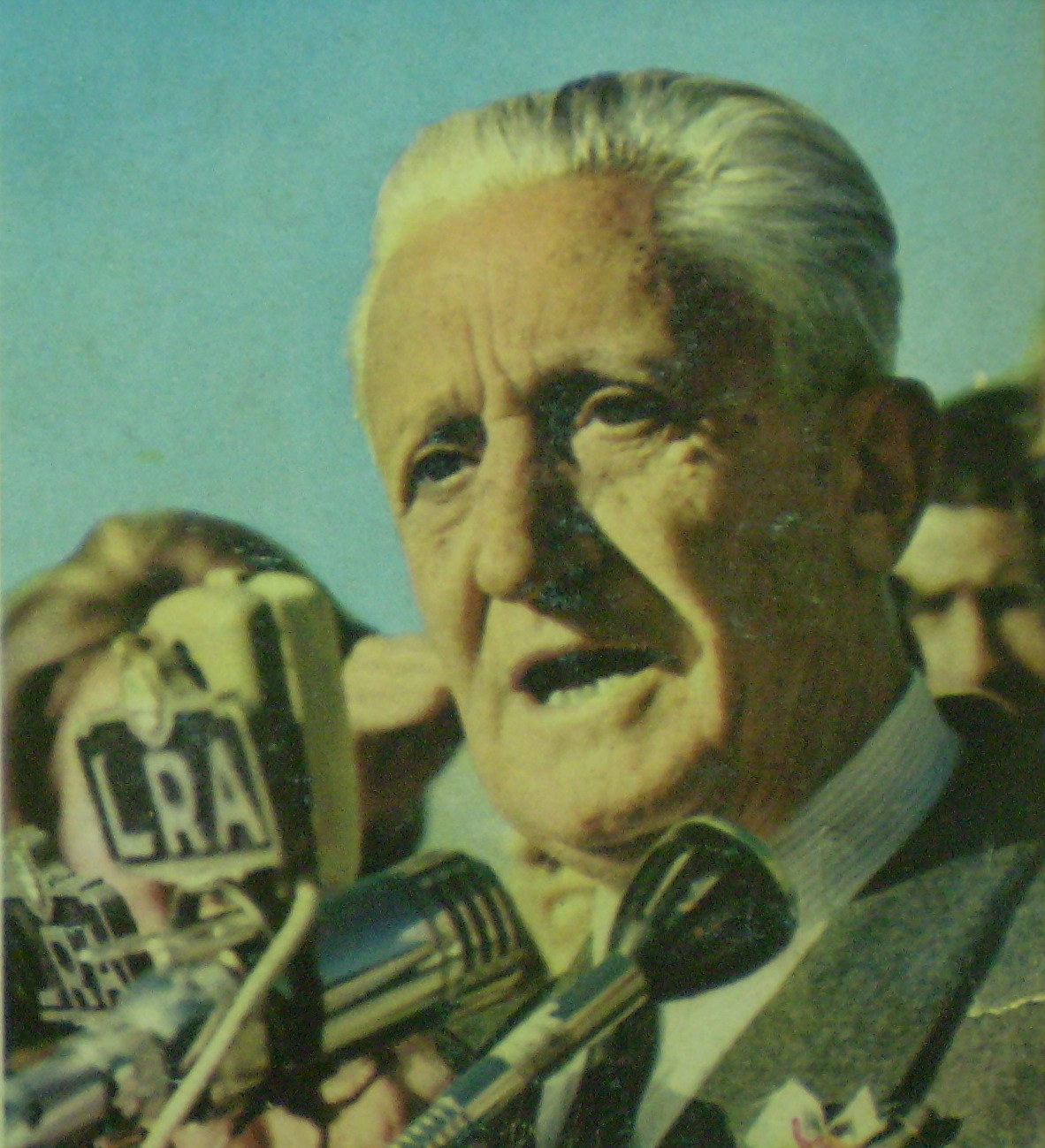
Ex-president Arturo Illia in 1970.

Illia lost his wife, Silvia Martorell, to cancer in September 1966, the same year he was deposed. For a short while he lived at his brother's home in the Buenos Aires suburb of Martínez, though he would make frequent trips to Córdoba. Judging the mild-mannered Illia not to be a threat, the Ongania administration allowed Illia to retire from politics without being held in detention like Frondizi or exiled like Perón. Illia returned to Cruz del Eje, Córdoba where he resumed his medical practice as a rural doctor often attending patients for free.

Illia would occasionally speak out during this period. For instance, after leftist guerrillas attacked the city of Córdoba, Illia called for the resignation of President Isabel Perón as the only solution to the country's social and political turmoil at the time.

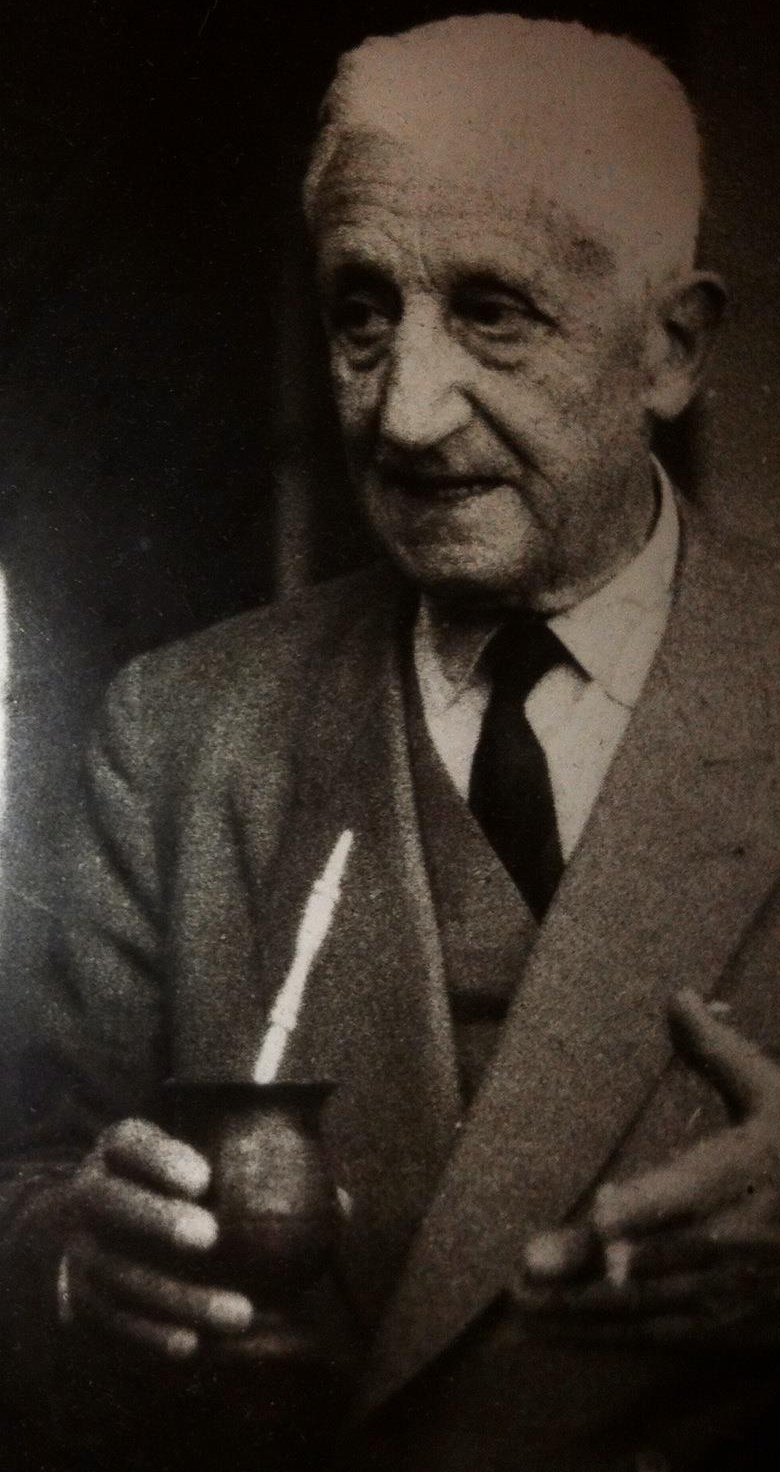
The ex-president of Argentina, Arturo Illia, in the Province of Misiones with a mate in one hand.

He died in Cruz del Eje on 18 January 1983, at the age of 82, shortly before the return of democracy. Following a state memorial in Congress, Arturo Umberto Illia was buried in La Recoleta Cemetery, in Buenos Aires.

=== Homages ===
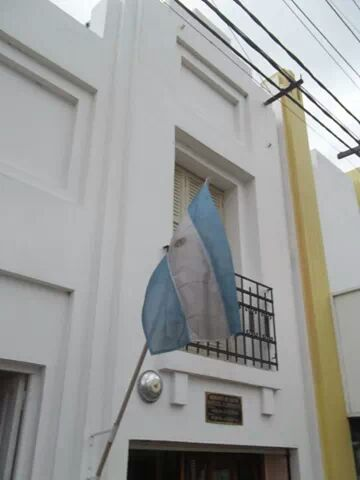
Arturo Illia's house museum.

The Arturo Umberto Illia House Museum located at 181 Avellaneda street in the downtown neighborhood of Cruz del Eje, in the province of Córdoba, Argentina, was declared a National Historic Monument on 27 November 2001, by Law 25,533.

The House-Museum constitutes a unique heritage. It was established in the center of the town of Cruz del Eje as a reflection of its owner, Arturo Illia. The house is characteristically middle class, built in the Art Deco style, with the balcony above the garage, three bedrooms, dining room, bathroom, kitchen and living room.

=== Honours ===
- Chile: Collar of the Order of Merit (29 October 1965)
- France: Knight Grand Cross of the Order of the Legion of Honour (October 1964)
- Italy: Knight Grand Cross with collar of the Order of Merit of the Italian Republic (8 September 1965)

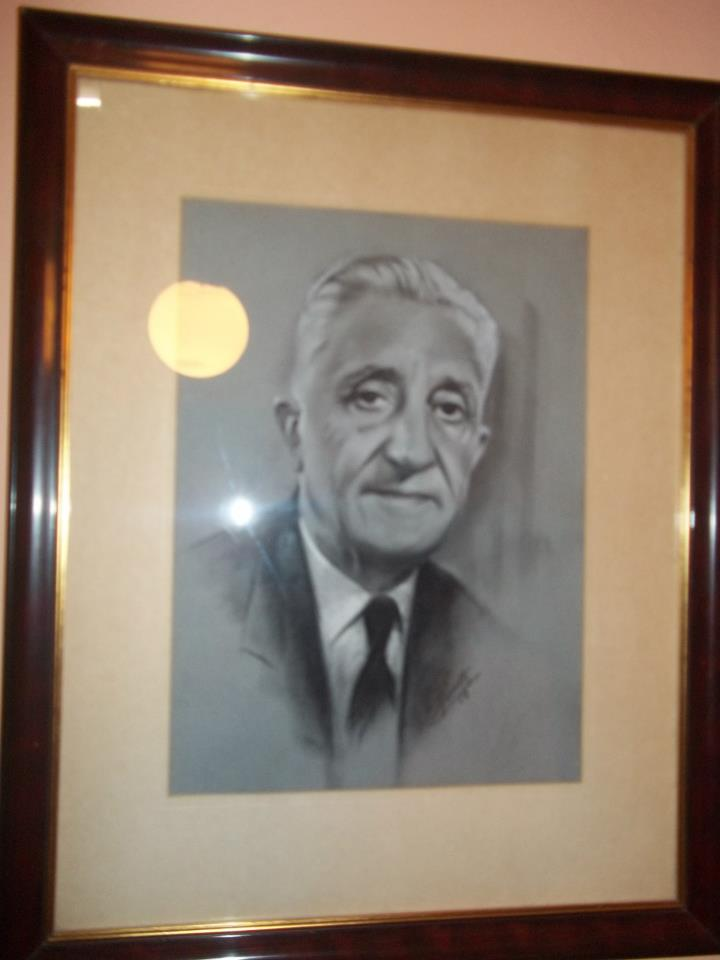
portrait of illia.

Assembly seats
Preceded by Fidel Torres	Provincial Senator of Córdoba for Cruz del Eje; 1936–1940	Succeeded by Nicolás Pedernera
Government offices
Preceded by Alejandro Gallardo	Vice Governor of Córdoba; 1940–1943	Succeeded by Ramón Asìs
Party political offices
Preceded by Ricardo Balbín	Radical Civic Union nominee for President of Argentina; 1963	Succeeded by Ricardo Balbín
Political offices
Preceded by José María Guido	President of Argentina; 1963–1966	Succeeded by Juan Carlos Onganía
