= Decree Law 4161/56 =

Government of Argentina
- Long title: Decree Law 4161/56 - By which the Peronist Party is dissolved in its two branches by virtue of its performance and its liberticidal vocation, and Considering: That in its political existence the Peronist Party, acting as an instrument of the deposed regime, used an intense propaganda aimed at deceiving the citizen consciousness for which I create images, symbols, signs and significant expressions, doctrines, articles and artistic works
- Citation: 1956, c. 37
- Territorial extent: Argentina
- Enacted by: President of Argentina
- Signed by: Pedro Eugenio Aramburu
- Commenced: 5 March 1956
- Repealed: 30 October 1964

Repealed by
- Law Nº 16.648 of 1964

Summary
- Outlaw of Peronism

Keywords
- Peronism
- Status: Repealed

Decree Law 4161/56 (Spanish: Decreto ley 4161/56) was an Argentine government decree designed to suppress Peronist sentiment among the Argentine people. Enacted on 5 March 1956, six months after the 1955 overthrow of President Juan Perón in the Revolución Libertadora, the decree instituted a wide-ranging ban on any "affirmation of Peronism" under the government of Pedro Eugenio Aramburu.

== Decree Law 4161/56 ==
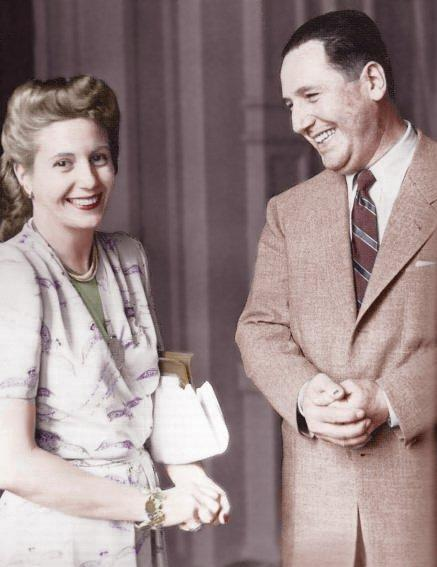
Juan Perón and Evita Perón, as depicted on a 1950s photograph. Decree Law 4161/56 prohibited their names from being mentioned.

The decree officially outlawed the "affirmation of Peronism, publicly performed, or Peronist propaganda, by any person, whether by individuals or groups of individuals, associations, unions, political parties, corporations, legal entities of public or private images, symbols, signs, significant expressions, items and artwork doctrines, intending genuine or could be taken by anyone as such owned or used by individuals or bodies representative of Peronism."

Violation of the decree was punishable by a prison sentence of 30 days to 6 years. Additionally, offenders were subject to a fine ranging from 500 to 1 million Argentine pesos and were barred from holding office in public institutions, trade unions or political parties. If the infringer was a commercial company, its operations were to be suspended for 15 days and permanently should the offence be repeated. Dissolution of legal entities was also a possible sanction. The sanctions could not be imposed on a suspended sentence, and the penalties were not excarcelable.

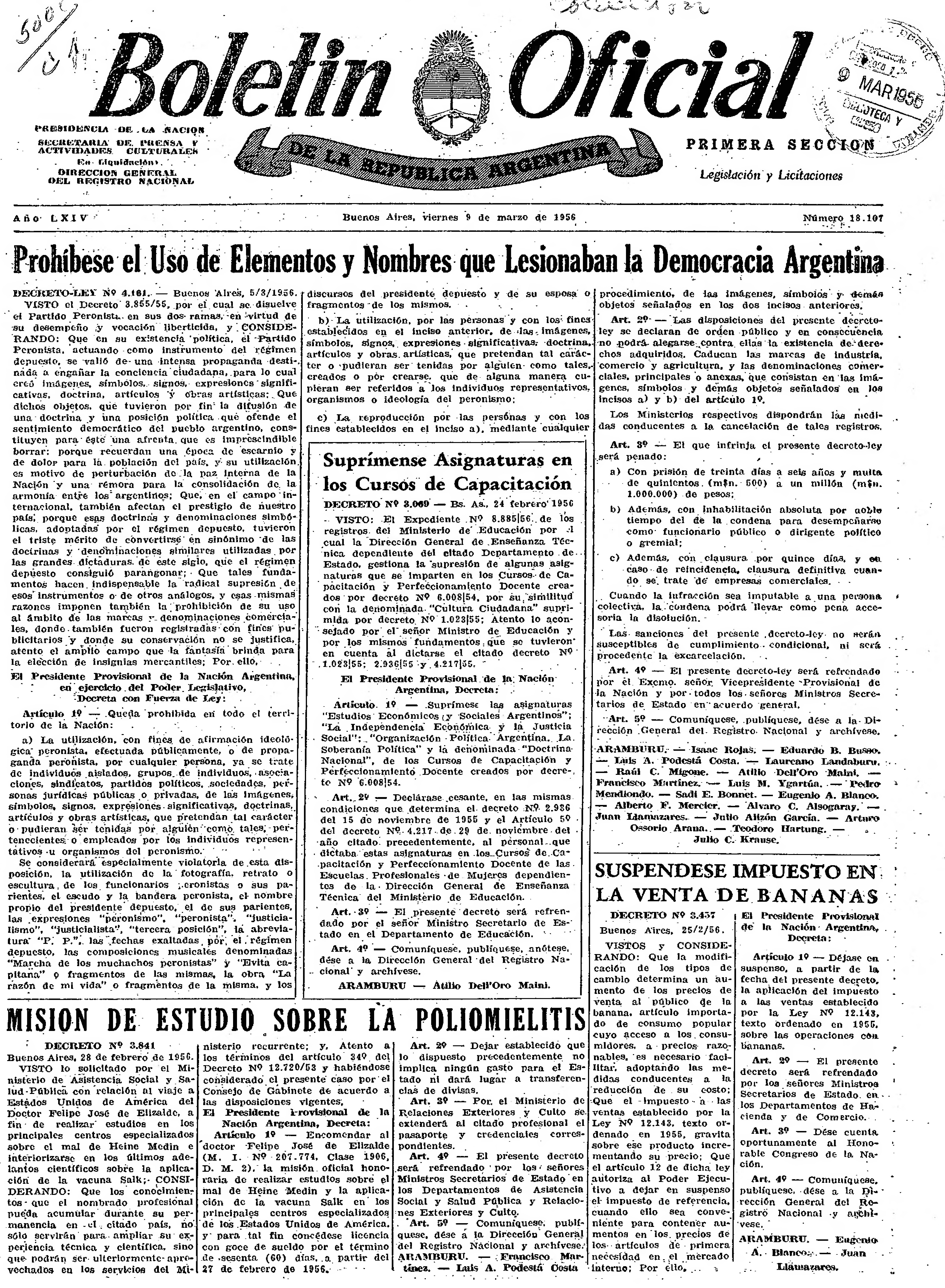
Decree/Law 4161/56 in the Boletín Oficial

The law explicitly prohibited images of the former president and even went as far as to outlaw mentioning the names of both the former president and his wife Evita, a woman particularly popular with the poor Argentines of the working class, as Article I of the decree banned not only the "photographs, portraits, and sculptures" of the former president but also the very names of Juan and Eva Perón, the names of Perón's officials, and other symbols and references to the Peróns, the former administration, and the Justicialist Party. Two musical works which celebrated Juan and Eva Perón – Marcha de los Muchachos Peronista and Evita Capitana – were banned explicitly.

Aramburu himself only referred to Perón as "the monster" and newspapers identified him as "the fugitive tyrant." Anthropologist Antonius Robben describes the shouting of Perón's name as "a small act of resistance" under Aramburu.

Implementation of the decree was suspended during the tenure of Arturo Frondizi.

== Repeal ==
The Decree/Law 4161/56 was repealed by Law 16648, voted in the National Congress on October 30, 1964 and promulgated (published in the Boletín Oficial) by Arturo Umberto Illia on November 18, 1964.
