= Socialist Party of the National Left =

The Socialist Party of the National Left (Spanish: Partido Socialista de la Izquierda Nacional, PSIN) was a political party in Argentina, founded in 1962 by Jorge Abelardo Ramos, Jorge Enea Spilimbergo and others, representative of the National Left Argentine political tradition.

The political philosopher Ernesto Laclau was a member of the PSIN until 1969, when the British historian Eric Hobsbawm supported his entrance to Oxford.

== See also ==
- National Left
