= Nahuel Moreno =

Argentine Trotskyist activist (1924–1987)

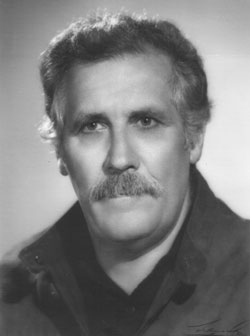
- Moreno before 1987
- Born: Hugo Miguel Bressano Capacete; 24 April 1924; Buenos Aires, Argentina
- Died: 25 January 1987 (aged 62); Buenos Aires, Argentina
- Occupations: Unionist, writer and politician
- Known for: Founding the International Workers League – Fourth International

Nahuel Moreno (real name Hugo Miguel Bressano Capacete; 24 April 1924 – 25 January 1987) was a Trotskyist leader from Argentina. Moreno was active in the Trotskyist movement from 1942 until his death.

== Biography ==
=== 1950s–1960s ===
During the 1953–1963 split in the Fourth International he backed the International Committee faction led by the Socialist Workers Party (United States). For much of this time he published a journal called Palabra Obrera, and organised the Movimiento de Agrupaciones Obreras, which sought to act as the left wing of the Peronist movement.

Prior to the reunification of the two factions in 1963, the International Secretariat's best-known leader in Latin America, J. Posadas, left to form his own Fourth International (Posadist). After Posadas' departure, Moreno became the central leader of the International's Latin American Bureau. When the Fourth International was reunified in 1963, his current helped to found the Revolutionary Workers Party in Argentina.

=== 1970s–1980s ===
In the 1970s, when divisions surfaced over guerrilla warfare inside the International, Moreno led the pro-SWP faction of the PRT which eventually established a public faction, the PRT-La Verdad. This group oriented around fighting for union rights and mass-based party building. In 1973, it fused with the pro-Trotskyist Socialist Party of Argentina to found the Socialist Workers Party (PST) of Argentina. The PST sided with the SWP as Moreno had sided with them for several years. As factional differences within the International peaked, the American SWP formed the Leninist Trotskyist Faction, of which Moreno's PST was a part.

After the LTF was dissolved, The PST helped to form the Bolshevik Faction which left the International late in 1979, partly in opposition to the nature of the USFI's support for the FSLN's strategy and tactics in the revolution of Nicaragua.

Moreno formed a new international grouping with Pierre Lambert's supporters, but this lasted only until 1981. Moreno and his supporters then formed their own international grouping, the International Workers' League (IWL), mostly, but not exclusively, based in Latin America. In 1983 they built the Argentine Movement for Socialism (MAS) and shortly thereafter the Brazilian Socialist Convergence, based in the Metal Workers Confederation and an initial organizer of the Workers' Party (PT). In response to what they viewed as an undemocratic process and pro-capitalist orientation of the PT, they left and formed the United Socialist Workers' Party (PSTU) but were also part of the IWL disintegration after Moreno's death.

== See also ==
- Movement for Socialism (Argentina)
