= José Ignacio Rucci =

Argentine politician (1924–1973)

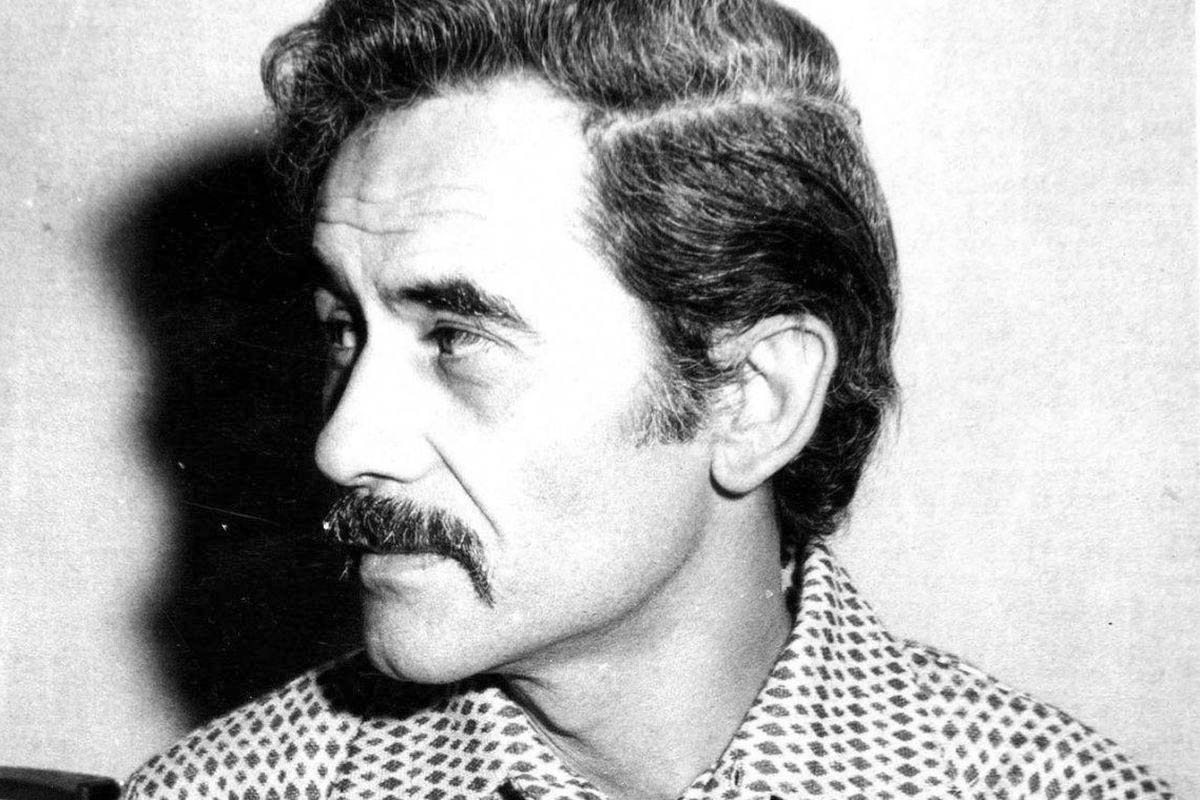
- Born: 15 March 1924; Alcorta, Santa Fe, Argentina
- Died: 25 September 1973 (aged 49); Buenos Aires, Argentina
- Cause of death: Shot in an attack
- Occupation: Secretary General of the CGT
- Children: 2, including Claudia Rucci

José Ignacio Rucci (5 March 1924 – 25 September 1973) was an Argentine politician and union leader, appointed general secretary of the CGT (General Confederation of Labour) in 1970. Close to the Argentine president Juan Perón, and a chief representative of the "syndical bureaucracy" (the trade-union movement's right wing), he was assassinated in 1973.

== Trade unionist career ==
The son of modest Italian immigrants, he was born in Alcorta, Santa Fe Province, and emigrated to Buenos Aires as a young man to find work. He became a steelworker in the Ballester-Molina weapons factory. There he met Hilario Salvo, leader of the recently founded Unión Obrera Metalúrgica (UOM) steelworkers' union.

Rucci was present on the Plaza de Mayo, as well as thousands of workers, on 17 October 1945, a historical date in Peronism. Elected trade union delegate for the first time in 1947, he retained this function until 1953.

Following the self-styled Revolución Libertadora, a military coup which ousted Perón in 1955, Rucci progressively acquired fame by participating in the Peronist Resistance movement and was jailed several times for breaching Decree Law 4161/56, which proscribed the very mention of Perón's name. Following the creation of the 62 Organizations, the political branch of the CGT, to which he ascribed, Rucci quickly progressed inside the unions' hierarchy, alongside fellow UOM leader Augusto Vandor.

At first a unionist leader in the SOMISA steelworking factory in San Nicolás de los Arroyos (the nation's largest), he assumed the post of press secretary of the UOM in 1960 and sat on its board of directors alongside Vandor, Paulino Niembro, Avelino Fernández and Lorenzo Miguel. He was named inspector in 1964 for the San Nicolás de los Arroyos union local, where he later became the general secretary.

Rucci strongly opposed the unionist Agustín Tosco, the leader of the Córdoba trade union Luz y Fuerza, who held a more leftist position than Rucci and opposed the syndical bureaucracy's "participationist" (pragmatic) stance towards the military government of General Juan Carlos Onganía, installed in 1966.

== General secretary of the CGT ==
The CGT split into the conservative Azopardo branch (named after the headquarters' address in Buenos Aires) and the CGT de los Argentinos (CGTA) following the annulment of the election of the left-wing graphic workers' leader Raimundo Ongaro as secretary general. The eventual Cordobazo of May 1969 led to the CGT-Azopardo's placement in receivership (the CGTA had been banned from the start), though in December, the order was lifted.

Displacing José Alonso in July 1970, Rucci was elected general secretary of the CGT, by 544 delegates of 618 present, during the Normalization Congress, which led to deepened differences between the CGT-Azopardo and the CGTA, which claimed a more radical leftist stance opposed to the military junta. Those who voted against were the Vandoristas, on the right-wing (Vandor had spoken in favour of a "Peronism without Perón", supporting the "participationist" tendency among the workers' movement), and the Cordobeses, who were in favour of armed struggle against the junta.

As the new general secretary of the CGT (hereafter CGT-Azopardo), Rucci launched the slogan "Nothing Without Perón" (Nada sin Perón) and, after initial optimism, opposed President Alejandro Lanusse's National Accords (Gran Acuerdo Nacional) of July 1971, which outlined a road map to the return to democratic rule, but which preserved the military's vetting power over policy. This helped unite Peronist forces towards the goal of Perón's return from exile.

Privately, however, Rucci maintained contacts in the Lanusse regime, and lobbied against repeated wage freeze proposals. Hosting Lanusse at an April 1971 summit with the CGT, Rucci persuaded the president to begin negotiations with Perón and other political leaders and to return the late Eva Perón's remains to Argentina. At least as powerful a symbol among Peronists as the leader himself, Evita had been ordered hidden in Milan by the regime that overthrew Perón in 1955, and their repatriation of her remains would buy time for all concerned in the negotiations.

Ongoing delays and the failure of the National Accords led Rucci to public threats of a general strike, while maintaining his contacts with Lanusse, and giving Perón the opportunity to appear magnanimous by urging against them. Privately, however, Rucci came to doubt that the aging Perón would return in time to run again for office and began exploring a "syndicalist-military option," by which Lanusse would call elections, and the CGT would back an amenable candidate from within the armed forces – most likely Lanusse's labor liaison, General Tomás Sánchez de Bustamante.

Ultimately, Lanusse agreed to elections, and to allow Perón to visit Argentina in preparations. Perón arrived on 17 November 1972 and secured a number of alliances for the upcoming March 1973 elections. Rucci provided a lasting anecdote on the occasion when, during a strong rain, he greeted Perón as the latter deplaned, and spontaneously opened his umbrella to shield the aging leader.

Elected by a landslide, Perón's stand-in, Dr. Héctor Cámpora, took office with a left-wing agenda opposed by Rucci, much of the syndical apparatus, and Perón's influential chief of staff, José López Rega. Cámpora allowed Peronism's "Revolutionary Tendency" faction the pick of several cabinet positions and other significant government posts. Perón, in turn, insisted on the right-wing López Rega's appointment as the Minister of Social Welfare (controlling 30% of the national budget).

Making inflation reduction a top policy priority, Economy Minister José Ber Gelbard implemented the Social Pact, which Rucci signed with the Confederación General Económica (CGE) representing management. The agreement, which proposed a price freeze and an increase of wages, was opposed both by the Peronist Left and by the employers' organizations, who claimed it went against free market precepts. Although Rucci was depicted by the Peronist Left as part of the Syndical Bureaucracy, according to the author Berzaba, he received no support, from either López Rega, UOM leader Lorenzo Miguel (a top Syndical Bureaucracy figure), or even Gelbard, once the latter had obtained his signature on the Social Pact.

Perón himself returned to Argentina on 20 June, three weeks after Cámpora's inaugural. Rucci, Miguel and other syndicalist figures organized the event at which Perón was to address the hundreds of thousands of supporters gathered near Ezeiza Airport. Hours before the scheduled landing, snipers following orders from López Rega shot at leftists in the crowd from the platform. The ensuing Ezeiza Massacre irreparably split Peronists between the revolutionary left wing and the right wing. The latter's benefactor, López Rega, would increasingly wield influence through Perón's neophyte wife, Isabel.

== Final days ==
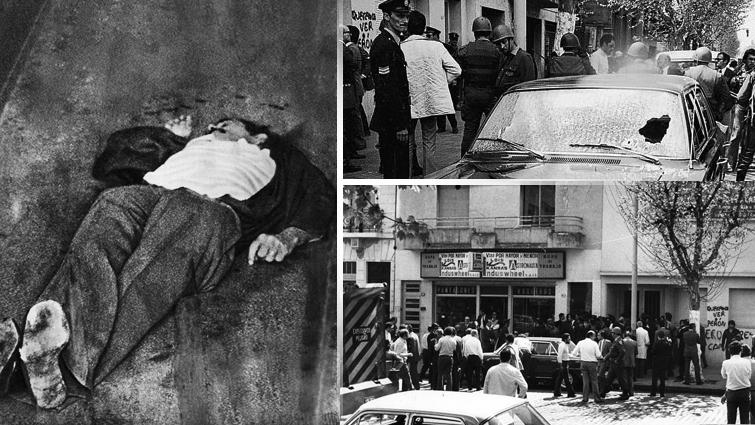
The murder of Rucci, 25 September 1973

In the context of increased social conflicts and worsening tensions, Rucci's personal secretary, Osvaldo Bianculli, was assassinated, after which Rucci moved into the CGT's cramped headquarters in an attempt to protect his life. He was increasingly isolated and well aware of the threats on his life.

Following snap elections in September, which resulted in Perón's return to high office, Rucci returned to his Flores neighborhood home. As he approached his car on the morning of 25 September, he was ambushed and shot twenty-three times. His body was found in front of a poster for the Traviatta crackers, which were known for having twenty-three small holes punched through them. This led to Rucci being mockingly nicknamed "Traviatta" by some political sectors.

Allegedly led by a Montoneros operative known as "Roqué," the commando operation had not been agreed to by the entire leadership of the far-left Montoneros. Carlos Hobert, one of its senior leaders, learned of the assassination by the radio. Some, such as El Barba Gutiérrez, leader of the Peronist Workers' Youth, as well as Juan Carlos Dante Gullo, of the Peronist Youth, believed that Rucci had been assassinated by the CIA, in an attempt to destabilize Peronism. Perón himself declared at Rucci's death: "They killed my son. They cut off my legs". After Rucci's assassination, Perón went into a state of depression and his health declined further.

Years later, the Montoneros' leadership unofficially recognized their responsibility in Rucci's assassination, which emotionally shook the unsentimental Perón, who cried for the first time in public. The majority of the Montoneros admitted this murder, which prompted Perón to support López Rega's Triple A death squad, was arguably a major political mistake.

== Bibliography ==
- Beraza, Luís Fernando. José Ignacio Rucci, Editorial: Vergara, 2007 (in Spanish).
- Garbely, Frank: El viaje del arco iris. Buenos Aires: El Ateneo, 2003 (in Spanish).
