= Argentine Revolution =

Military junta that ruled Argentina from 1966 to 1973

1966 Argentine coup d'état
- Part of the Cold War
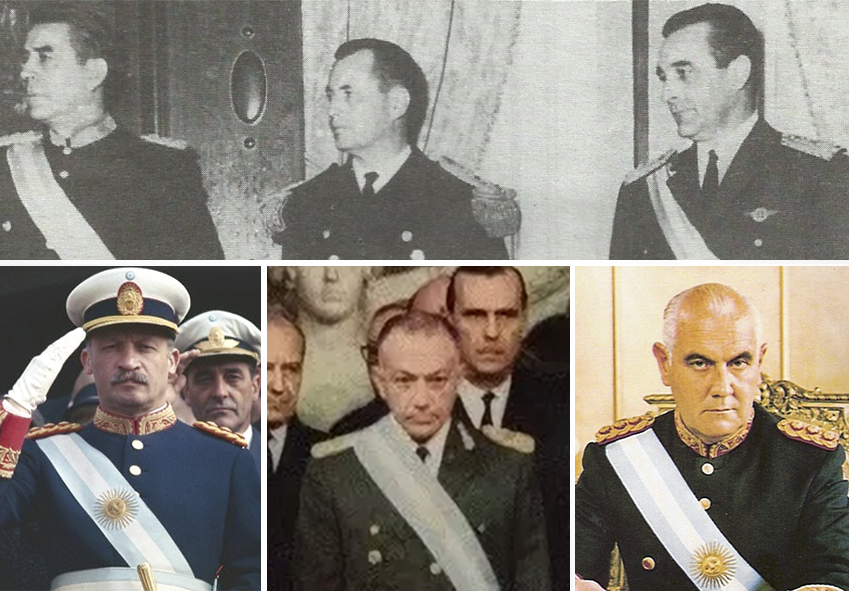
- At the top, the commanders of the Revolutionary Junta, and below, Generals Juan Carlos Onganía, Roberto Marcelo Levingston, and Alejandro Lanusse, the three successive dictators of the Argentine Revolution who de facto held the office of President of the Argentine Nation.
Date	28 June 1966
Location	Casa Rosada, Buenos Aires, Argentina
Result	Overthrow of the government of Arturo Umberto Illia. Suspension of the liberal democracy and establishment of military dictatorship.

Belligerents
Argentine Armed Forces rebels	Government of Argentina: Radical Civic Union

Commanders and leaders
Pascual Pistarini; Adolfo Álvarez; Benigno Varela	Arturo Umberto Illia

The Argentine Revolution (Spanish: Revolución Argentina) is the self-styled name of the civil-military dictatorship that overthrew the constitutional president Arturo Illia through a coup d'état on June 28, 1966, and ruled the country until May 25, 1973. The dictatorship did not present itself as a "provisional government" (as all the previous coups had done in Argentina), but rather sought to establish itself as a new permanent dictatorial system later associated with the concept of the bureaucratic-authoritarian State.

== General view of the self-styled "Revolución Argentina" and the authoritarian-bureaucratic state ==
The June 1966 coup established General Juan Carlos Onganía as the de facto president and dictator, supported by several leaders of the General Confederation of Labour (CGT), including the general secretary Augusto Vandor. This was followed by a series of military-appointed presidents and the implementation of liberal economic policies, supported by multinational companies, employers' federations/industrial capitalists, and a section of the workers' movement —which by the 1960s had become bureaucratized and corrupt in some of Argentina's trade unions—, as well as most of the press.

While preceding military coups were aimed at establishing temporary and transitional juntas, the "Revolución Argentina" headed by Onganía aimed at establishing a new political and social order, opposed both to liberal democracy and to Communism, which would give the Armed Forces of Argentina a leading political and economic role, all with the aim of staying in power for decades. Political scientist Guillermo O'Donnell named this type of regime "authoritarian-bureaucratic state", in reference to the Revolución Argentina, the 1964–1985 Brazilian military regime and Augusto Pinochet's regime (starting in 1973).

=== Technocracy under the Onganía regime ===
From its onset, the Onganía regime proposed to eliminate the existing organizational scheme and restructure the entire state apparatus. Article 2 of the "Estatuto de la Revolución Argentina" announced a new law to establish the number of ministries and Secretariats of State that would be entrusted with the affairs of State, as well as their functions and interdependence.

The careers of the new members of the state were marked by technical specialization. This attribute gave them a technocratic legitimacy, useful for modernizing public offices without political components. Thus, both the origin of economic or cultural activities and the technocratic attributes of the new ministerial layer gave a corporate tone to the formation of the first cabinet of the Argentine Revolution. An example in this sense is the Secretary of Housing whose heads were construction entrepreneurs and an architect.

For its part, the ministry of economy was briefly headed by Salimei, a businessman in the oilseed trade, while the other two ministers (Adalbert Krieger Vasena and Jose Maria Dagnino Pastore) listed prior experience in government and academe. Also worth noting is the appointment of private sector executives to the secretariats, in Agriculture, farmer Lorenzo Raggio; in Energy and Mining, businessman of a foreign electrical material firm, Luis Gotelli; and in Public Works, the director of a cement company contracted by the State, Esteban Guaia. With a study even affirming that 76% of the Onganía Regime came from private business backgrounds.

This way, each ministerial sector was confined to a businessman from the sector, evidencing the attempt to promote the integration of representatives of the vital forces of development in decision-making. This new paradigm of participation and representation breaks with the model of ministerial integration of previous governments, which were mainly staffed by party accountants with regard to economic functions.

=== Corporatism under the Onganía regime ===
The Onganía regime had a corporatist ideology, experimenting in particular in Córdoba under the governance of Carlos Caballero. Although in practice, it represented a type of exclusive corporatism, where only private interests were represented through organizations. They were given representation in the State in exchange for accepting certain controls.

In reality, this led to many functions and structures of the State passing into private hands, but in an unbalanced way. Business and religious groups ended up taking control of important areas of the government. As a result, the state's ability to act independently and efficiently was greatly reduced, which also explains why resistance to these measures arose.

For instance, some Catholic fundamentalists were in the Ministry of Social Welfare (although with a short stay), such as Minister Roberto Petracca and the Secretary of Promotion and Community Assistance (SEPAC), Roberto Gorostiaga. Both were Catholic militants, members of Ciudad Católica, of the Verbo Magazine and followers of Jacques de Mahieu. Together with these, in 1967, there were also other types of Catholic groups in the Ministry of Social Welfare, with social Christian principles and modernizing for the time. In this spectrum were the minister, Julio Álvarez, the secretary of SEPAC, Raúl Puigbó, the undersecretary of SEPAC, Antonio Critto, and the undersecretary of Security.

During Onganía's government, the idea of "community development" of the organizations and Catholics came together and allowed the formation of the framework of intervention of the Ministry of Social Welfare. Based above all on the need to decentralize and give importance to the different sectors of the community in the development of some social initiatives.

Thus, the integration of the ministries offers a clear example of the corporatist element of this period. Especially, as it opened institutional areas to the representation of some interests of civil society. However, this opening occurred selectively, including mainly groups that already supported the government. The private actors that were incorporated had a limited role, as they could only provide information and technical advice, since this was considered to be the best form of participation.

== Onganía's rule (1966–1970) ==
The new Minister of Economy, Adalbert Krieger Vasena in December 1966 inaugurated a period that would last until May 1969, characterized by the absence of a well-organized and unified civil opposition. Krieger Vasena, decreed a wage freeze and a 40% devaluation, which weakened the economy – in particular the agricultural sector – and favored foreign capital. Vasena suspended collective labour conventions, reformed the "hydrocarbons law" which had established a partial monopoly of the Yacimientos Petrolíferos Fiscales (YPF) state firm, and passed a law facilitating the eviction of tenants over their non-payment of domestic rent. Finally, the right to strike was suspended (Law 16,936) and several other laws passed reversing previous progressive labor legislation (reducing retirement age, etc.).

The workers' movement divided itself between Vandoristas, who supported a "Peronism without Perón" line (Augusto Vandor, leader of the General Confederation of Labour, declared that "to save Perón, one has to be against Perón") and advocated negotiation with the junta, alongside "Participationists" headed by José Alonso, and Peronists, who formed the General Confederation of Labour of the Argentines (CGTA) in 1968 and were opposed to any kind of participation with the military junta. Perón himself, from his exile in Francoist Spain, maintained a cautious and ambiguous line of opposition to the regime, rejecting both the endorsement and open confrontation.

=== Cultural and education policies ===
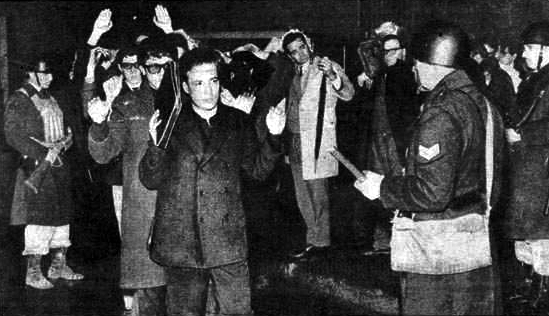
The Night of the Long Batons, one of the most notorious episodes of the "Argentine Revolution", was an attack by the dictatorship (using police violence) against University of Buenos Aires' professors, teachers, students and faculty members, which led both to international condemnation of the dictatorship and a massive migration of Argentine intellectuals, professionals and scholars abroad.

Onganía ended university autonomy, which had been achieved by the University Reform of 1918.

He was responsible for the July 1966 La Noche de los Bastones Largos ("The Night of the Long Truncheons"), where university autonomy was violated, in which he ordered police to invade the Faculty of Sciences of the University of Buenos Aires. They beat up and arrested students and professors. The university repression led to the exile of 301 university professors, among whom were Manuel Sadosky, Tulio Halperín Donghi, Sergio Bagú, and Risieri Frondizi.

Onganía also ordered repression on all forms of "immoralism", proscribing miniskirts, long hair for young men, and all avant-garde artistic movements. This moral campaign alienated the middle classes, who were massively present in universities.

=== Change of direction of the armed forces ===
Towards the end of May 1968, General Julio Alsogaray dissented from Onganía, and rumors spread about a possible coup d'état, with Algosaray leading the opposition to Onganía. At the end of the month Onganía dismissed the leaders of the armed forces: Alejandro Lanusse replaced Julio Alsogaray, Pedro Gnavi replaced Benigno Varela, and Jorge Martínez Zuviría replaced Adolfo Alvarez.

=== Increasing protests ===
On 19 September 1968, two important events affected Revolutionary Peronism. John William Cooke, former personal delegate of Perón, an ideologist of the Peronist Left and friend of Fidel Castro, died from natural causes. On the same day a group of 13 men and one woman who aimed at establishing a foco in Tucumán Province, in order to head the resistance against the junta, was captured; among them was Envar El Kadre, then a leader of the Peronist Youth.

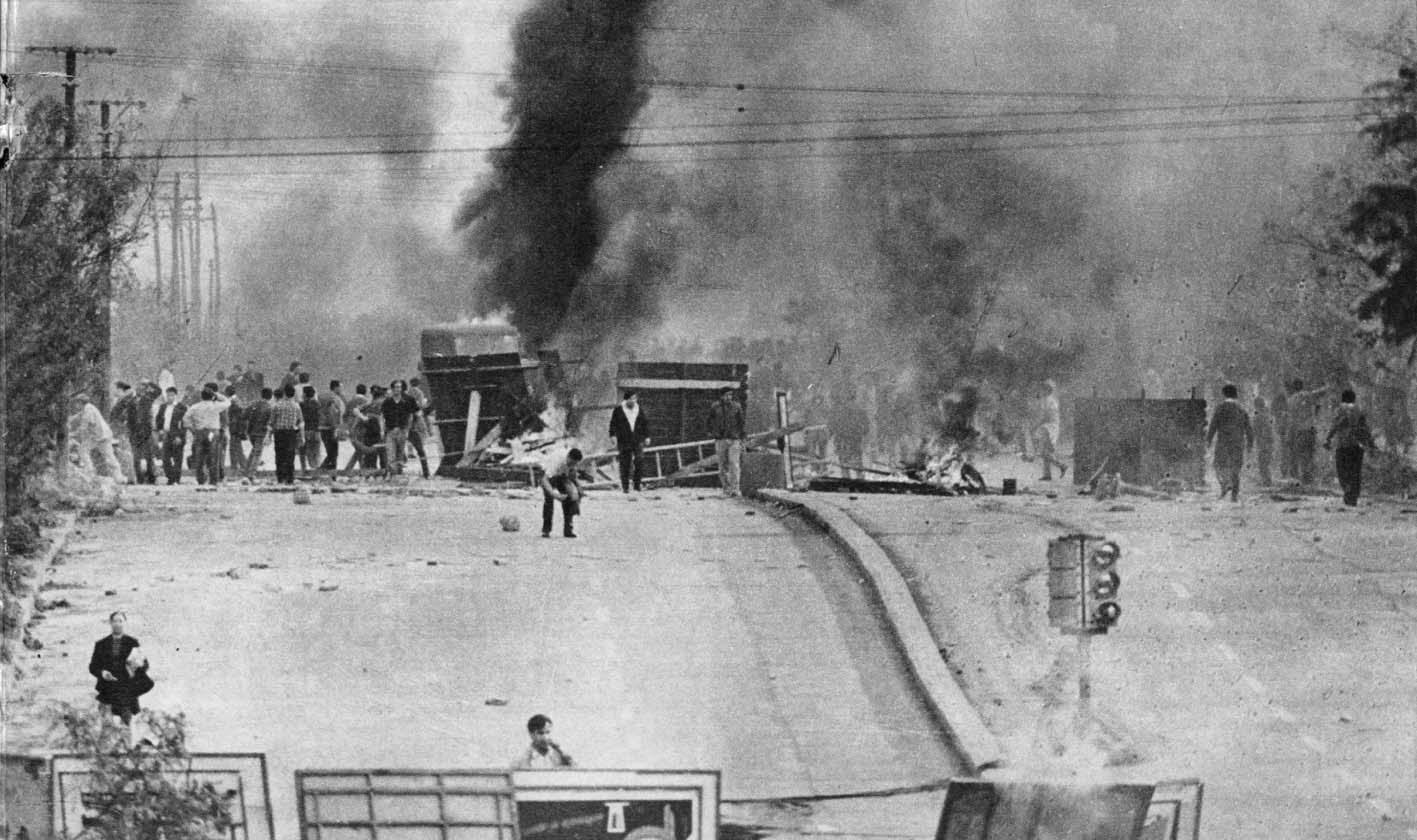
Images of the Cordobazo, May–June 1969

In 1969, the CGT de los Argentinos (led by Raimundo Ongaro) headed protest movements, in particular the Cordobazo, as well as other movements in Tucumán, Santa Fe and Rosario (Rosariazo). While Perón managed a reconciliation with Augusto Vandor, he followed, in particular through the voice of his delegate Jorge Paladino, a cautious line of opposition to the military junta, criticizing with moderation the neoliberal policies of the junta but waiting for discontent inside the government ("hay que desensillar hasta que aclare", said Perón, advocating patience). Thus, Onganía had an interview with 46 CGT delegates, among them Vandor, who agreed on "participationism" with the military junta, thus uniting themselves with the Nueva Corriente de Opinión headed by José Alonso and Rogelio Coria.

In December 1969, more than 20 priests, members of the Movement of Priests for the Third World (MSTM), marched on the Casa Rosada to present to Onganía a petition pleading him to abandon the eradication plan of villas miserias (shanty towns).

The same year, the MSTM issued a declaration supporting Socialist revolutionary movements, which led the Catholic hierarchy, by the voice of Juan Carlos Aramburu, coadjutor archbishop of Buenos Aires, to proscribe priests from making political or social declarations.

Various armed actions, headed by the Fuerzas Armadas de Liberación (FAL), composed by former members of the Revolutionary Communist Party, occurred in April 1969, leading to several arrests among FAL members. These were the first left-wing urban guerrilla actions in Argentina. Beside these isolated actions, the Cordobazo uprising of 1969, called forth by the CGT de los Argentinos, and its Cordobese leader, Agustín Tosco, prompted demonstrations in the entire country. The same year, the People's Revolutionary Army (ERP) was formed as the military branch of the Trotskyist Workers' Revolutionary Party, leading an armed struggle against the dictatorship.

== Levingston's rule (1970–1971) ==
Faced with increasing opposition, in particular following the Cordobazo, General Onganía was forced to resign by the military junta, composed of the chiefs of the Army, the Navy and the Air Force. He was replaced by General Roberto M. Levingston, who, far from calling free elections, decided to deepen the Revolución Argentina. Levingston expressed the nationalist-developmentist sector of the Armed Forces, and was supported by the most intransigent military elements. He named the radical economist Aldo Ferrer as Minister of Economy.

A coalition of political parties issued the statement known as La Hora del Pueblo ("Time of the People"), calling for free and democratic elections which would include the Justicialist Party. Under this pressure, Levingston was ousted by an internal coup headed by the Chief of Staff of the Armed Forces and strongman of the Revolución Argentina, General Alejandro Agustín Lanusse.

== Lanusse's rule (1971–1973) ==
The last of the military presidents de facto of this period, Alejandro Lanusse, was appointed in March 1971. He was as unpopular as his predecessors. His administration started building infrastructure projects (roads, bridges, etc.) necessary for the development of the country, without responding to popular demands concerning social and economic policies.

General Lanusse tried to respond to the Hora del Pueblo declaration by calling elections but excluding Peronists from them, in the so-called Gran Acuerdo Nacional (Great National Agreement). He nominated Arturo Mor Roig (Radical Civic Union) as Minister of Interior, who enjoyed the support of the Hora del pueblo coalition of parties, to supervise the coming elections.

There had been no elections since 1966, and armed struggle groups came into existence, such as the Ejército Revolucionario del Pueblo (ERP, the armed wing of the Workers' Revolutionary Party, PRT), the Catholic nationalist Peronists Montoneros and the Fuerzas Armadas Revolucionarias (FAR).

In August 1972, an attempt by several revolutionary members to escape from prison, headed by Mario Roberto Santucho (PRT), was followed by what became known as the Trelew massacre. Fernando Vaca Narvaja, Roberto Quieto, Enrique Gorriarán Merlo and Domingo Menna managed to complete their escape, but 19 others were re-captured. 16 of them, members of the Montoneros, the FAR, and the ERP, were killed, and 3 managed to survive. On the same night of August 22, 1972, the junta approved law 19,797, which proscribed any information concerning guerrilla organizations. The massacre led to demonstrations in various cities.

Finally, Lanusse lifted the proscription of the Justicialist Party, although he maintained it concerning Juan Perón by increasing the number of years of residency required of presidential candidates, thus excluding de facto Perón from the elections since he had been in exile since the 1955 Revolución Libertadora.

Henceforth, Perón decided to appoint as his candidate his personal secretary Héctor José Cámpora, a leftist Peronist, as representative of the FreJuLi (Frente Justicialista de Liberación, Justicialist Liberation Front), composed of the Justicialist Party and minor, allied parties. The FreJuLi's electoral slogan was "Cámpora in Government, Perón in power" (Cámpora al Gobierno, Perón al poder).

== See also ==
- History of Argentina
