= Raimundo Ongaro =

Argentine union leader (1924–2016)

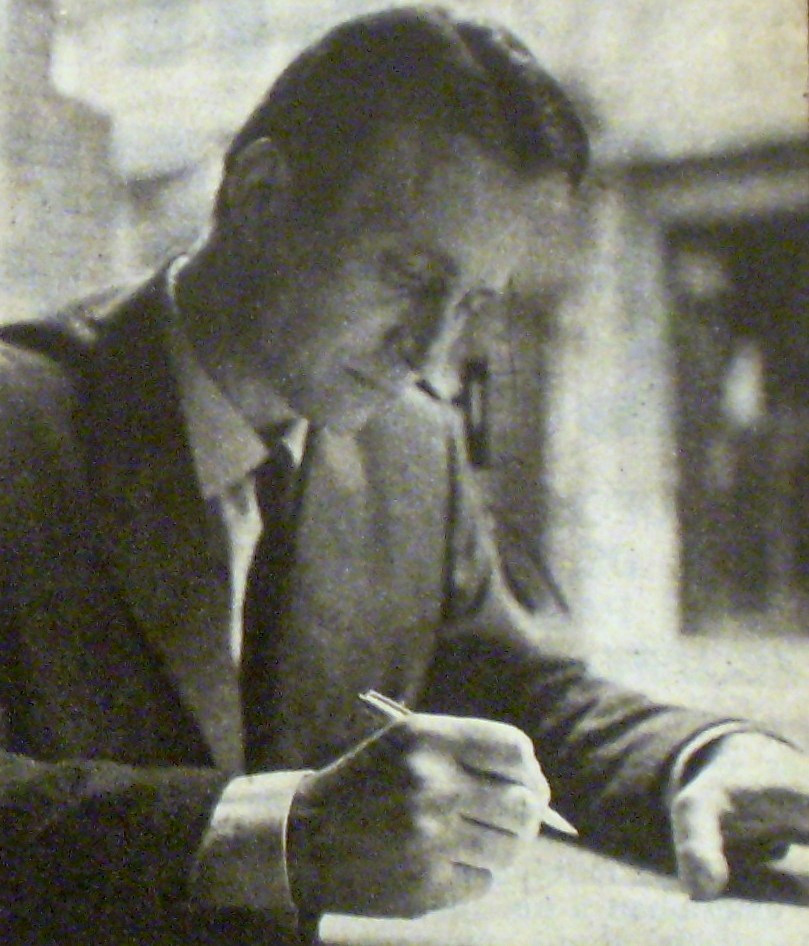

Secretary General of the General Confederation of Labour of the Argentines
- In office March 30, 1968 – September 16, 1974
- Preceded by: Francisco Prado
- Succeeded by: Adelino Romero

Secretary General of the Buenos Aires Printworkers Federation
- In office December, 1984 – April 15, 2016
- Succeeded by: Héctor Amichetti
- In office November 13, 1966 – May, 1975

Personal details
- Born: February 13, 1924 Mar del Plata, Argentina
- Died: August 1, 2016 (aged 92) Los Polvorines, Argentina
- Occupation: Union leader

Raimundo José Ongaro (13 February 1924 – 1 August 2016) was an Argentine union leader. He was secretary general of the General Confederation of Labour of the Argentines (CGTA) between 1968 and 1974.

== Early career and rise to prominence ==
Ongaro was born to a middle-class family of Italian Argentines from the Friuli-Venezia Giulia region, in the Argentine seashore city of Mar del Plata in 1924. Fluent in Latin and schooled in music composition, Ongaro became an apprenticed graphist and was eventually hired at COGTAL, one of Argentina's largest publishing cooperatives. Becoming active in the Buenos Aires Printworkers' Federation (FGB), the 1966 coup d'état against President Arturo Illia and its resulting advent of anti-labor policies led Ongaro to remove FGB leader Osvaldo Vigna in a coup of his own, that November. This move, however, met with the disapproval of José Alonso, the head of the CGT (among whose 62 unions the FGB belonged) and forced Ongaro to pursue alliances within the fractious CGT union (then South America's largest). Ongaro's only ally among the 62 unions was initially the sanitary workers' Amado Olmos, and the duo were no match for Alonso's conciliatory strategy with the repressive new regime of General Juan Carlos Onganía. This stance, shared with powerful CGT leaders such as the steelworkers' Augusto Vandor and the construction workers' Rogelio Coria, was shaken by Security Committee head General Osiris Villegas' violent March 1967 assault on CGT headquarters done to impede a planned general strike.

Belonging to a CGT disoriented by the regime's surprise attack, Ongaro traveled to Cuba in early 1968, where, during a political conference, he met Argentine journalist and writer Rodolfo Walsh, with whom Ongaro flew to Madrid to introduce to the CGT's benefactor, exiled populist leader Juan Perón. Perón was impressed with both men and subscribed to Ongaro's view that the CGT leadership's efforts at dialogue with the dictatorship would be in vain. President Onganía had already ordered eight of the 62 CGT unions into government receivership (including the second-largest, the railway workers') and CGT elections in March 1968 pitted the steelworker's Vandor against Perón's own choice, Raimundo Ongaro. Vandor's steelworkers' union was the largest in the CGT and he still had allies such as Alonso and Coría; but Ongaro's allies now included the rail workers' Lorenzo Pepe and the telecom workers' Julio Guillán, both of whose unions were in receivership. Where Ongaro had Perón's own support, Vandor could only boast the endorsement of Onganía's new Labor Minister, Rubens San Sebastián, the architect of the President's "divide and conquer" strategy towards the CGT.

== The CGTA ==
Ongaro was elected Secretary General of the CGT on March 30, 1968, without a concession from the defeated Vandor and the Labor Minister annulled the election, impeding Ongaro's taking office. Writer Rodolfo Walsh and numerous adherents of the activist Third World Priests' Movement joined Ongaro, Pepe and their CGT supporters in creating the Argentine CGT (CGTA), a coalition announced during a rally on May 1, the international labor day.

Drawing from his publishing background, Ongaro had the CGTA draft a weekly newsletter which, under Ricardo de Luca's direction and with regular contributions from Walsh, Rogelio García Lupo and Horacio Verbitsky, became renowned for its treatment of local as well as international issues (the first issue featured coverage of the aftermath of the assassination of civil rights leader Martin Luther King Jr.). The CGTA was also the subject of banned documentaries by filmmaker Fernando "Pino" Solanas and others in the vanguard Grupo Cine Liberación. Numerous leaders from within Alonso's official CGT also extended their support, notably Córdoba Province light and power workers' leader Agustín Tosco, who earned the enmity of his union's national leader Juan José Taccone, by joining the CGTA. The CGTA was the target of intense harassment by the dictatorship, who over the next year had around 5,000 of its members detained nationwide. Tosco's support of a local autoworkers' strike at the important Córdoba FIAT plant in May 1969 was decisive in the demonstrations' brutal May 29 repression, whose subsequent riots became known as the Cordobazo.

The Cordobazo encouraged a hard line in the regime's labor relations policy. Having detained Tosco and numerous others, the mysterious June 30 assassination of Augusto Vandor provided a pretext for Ongaro's arrest and the banning of the CGTA. These struggles brought him to the attention of the International Labour Organization, which elected him a member of their administrative council later that year. Tosco's and Ongaro's repeated stays in prison and continued pressure led to the CGTA's inactivity and, on Ongaro's release in January 1972, he disbanded the defunct trade union and founded the independent Argentine Printworkers' Sindicate (SGA). Increasingly focused on influencing Juan Perón, whose return from exile was imminent, he established "Basic Peronism," a leftist political advocacy group.

== Terror and exile ==
Political pressure led the dictatorship to call for free and fair national elections in March 1973, which Perón's Justicialist Party won in a landslide; one Basic Peronism supporter, journalist Rodolfo Ortega Peña, was among those elected to Congress on Perón's FREJULI party list. Ongaro's independent union and leftist stance, however, made him a target to the CGT and to a far-right adviser close to Perón himself, José López Rega. Congressman Ortega Peña was assassinated by López Rega's death squad, the Argentine Anti-Communist Alliance (Triple A), on July 31, 1974, and the Ongaro family's home in the Buenos Aires suburb of Los Polvorines was frequently raided with impunity, leading to Mrs. Ongaro's miscarriage on one occasion.

Undeterred, Ongaro organized a September 16 meeting in Bella Vista, Tucumán, to support a sugarmill workers' strike led by Atilio Santillán. Reunited with other former CGTA allies including Agustín Tosco and steelworkers Francisco "Barba" Gutiérrez and Alberto Piccinini, Ongaro organized a conflict resolution committee geared for the defense of targeted unions. Piccinini's November election as shop steward at steelmaker ACINDAR's Villa Constitución plant eventually led to the March 1975 mass arrests of those at the plant as well as those of Ongaro and others at the committee.

Allowed a radio, he learned of the May 7 murder of his teenage son, Alfredo Máximo Ongaro, at the hands of the Triple A, and, upon his August 29 release, he was deported to Lima, Peru; Mrs. Ongaro and her remaining children had left days earlier, and only the warden's precautions prevented Ongaro's abduction and murder by the Triple A. The overthrow of Peru's populist dictator, Juan Velasco Alvarado, the following day led to an increasingly hostile climate for left-wing Argentine exiles in general, and Ongaro departed for Spain in June 1976.

Supported by Spanish sympathizers, European radio and TV interviews and remittances from the FGB itself, the Ongaros returned in March 1984, three months after Argentina's return to democracy.

== Ongaro's return to the FGB ==
Ongaro was reelected Secretary General of the FGB, which, despite its recent ordeal, still counted with around 25,000 members and remained Argentina's largest print workers' union. Welcomed into the CGT by Secretary General Saúl Ubaldini (a colleague of Ongaro's at the ILO), the FGB became less prominent as one of the smallest of the CGT's 62 unions. Ongaro, who earned renown for his uncompromising stance against anti-labor policies two decades earlier, concurred with the CGT's grudging support of the anti-labor President Carlos Menem (a Justicialist candidate elected with the CGT's support in 1989). Adverse to conflict, Ongaro refused to condemn Menem's October 1989 pardon of those who led Argentina's last dictatorship during its infamous 1976-79 campaign of human rights abuses.

Ongaro also kept a low profile during the advent of free market policies that ushered in an unprecedented era of corporate takeovers and mergers in Argentina during the 1990s. One such takeover, that of Editorial Atlántida (Argentina's leading magazine publisher) by Editorial Perfil in 1998, led to differences between affected employees and Ongaro, himself, who did not oppose the merger. The event led to strain between Ongaro and the FGB rank-and-file, though he has since been reelected as their Secretary General. The FGB's relatively conciliatory stance in collective bargaining negotiations fostered the emergence in 2011 of a rival faction, the Eduardo Ayala Classist Graphics Group.

Having led Argentina's largest print workers' unions, the FGB, since 1966, Ongaro became the dean of Argentine labor leaders.
