= José Alonso (trade unionist) =

Argentine politician and union leader

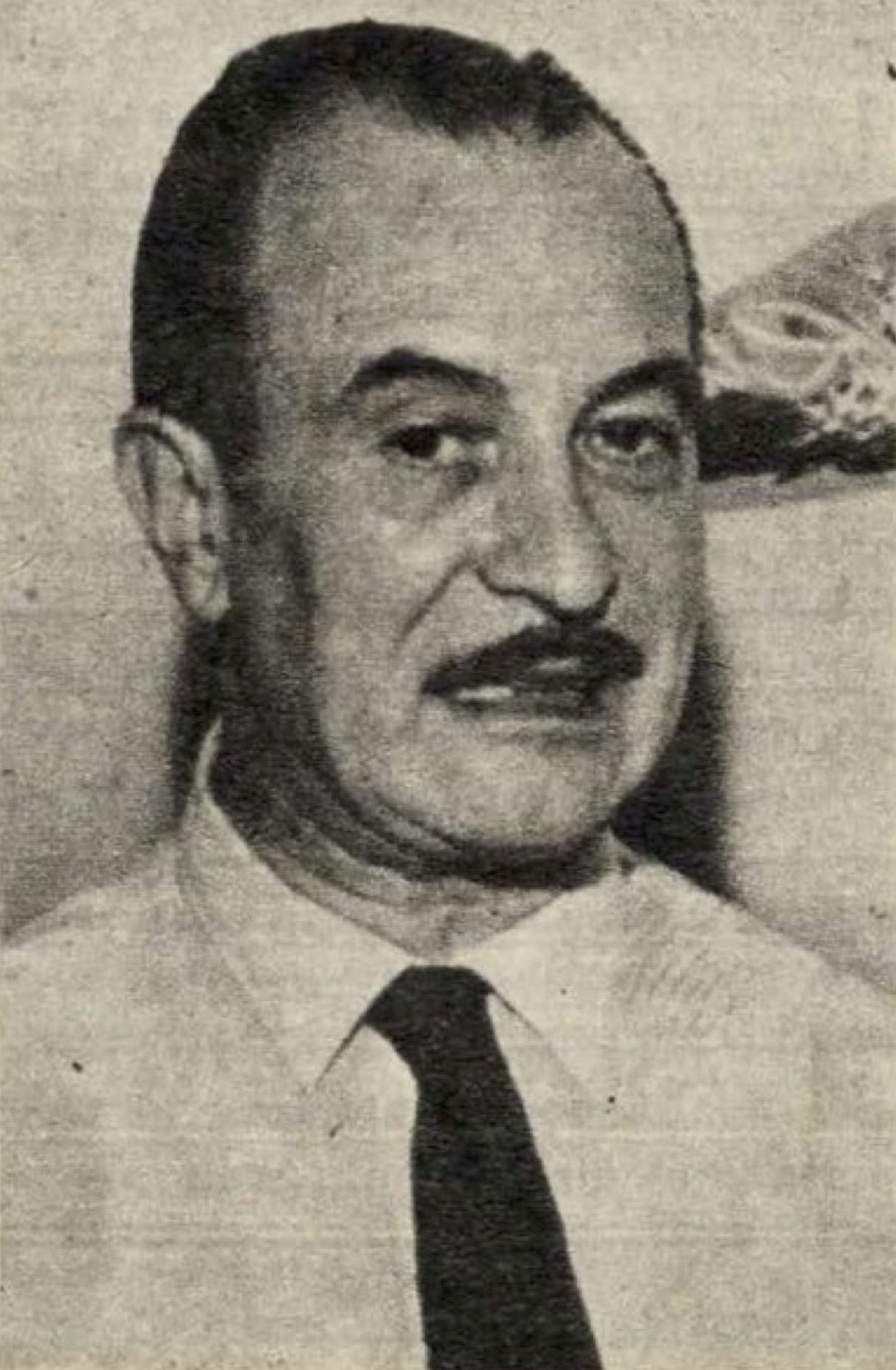
- José Alonso c. 1963.
- Born: February 6, 1917; Montserrat, Buenos Aires, Argentina
- Died: August 27, 1970 (aged 53); Buenos Aires, Argentina
- Cause of death: Assassination
- Occupations: Trade unionist, politician
- Organization: General Confederation of Labour

José Alonso (6 February 1917 – 27 August 1970) was an Argentine politician and trade unionist.

== Early life ==
José Alonso was born in the Monserrat, Buenos Aires, in 1917. The son of a Spanish tailor, he dedicated himself to the same profession, and was first elected as a union delegate of the tailors in 1938. Alonso initially supported socialism and Alfredo Palacios, but balked from the Socialist Party of Argentina in his support for the populist Colonel Juan Perón, Secretary of Labor of Pedro Pablo Ramírez' military government in power since June 4, 1943.

On March 23, 1943, Alonso created the SOIVA (Sindicato de la Industria del Vestido de la Capital Federal, Trade-Union of the Clothing Industry of the Federal Capital) textile trade-union to counter the influence of the communist FOV (Federación Obrera del Vestido, Workers' Federation of Clothing). Supported by Perón, the SOIVA soon became one of the strongest trade-unions of Argentina. In 1945, also with support of the military junta in power at that time, Alonso founded the FONIVA (Federación Obrera Nacional de la Industria del Vestido, National Workers' Federation of the Clothing Industry), and became its vice-secretary.

== During the Peronist government ==
José Alonso, elected secretary of the SOIVA in 1946, became part of the Confederal Central Committee of the General Confederation of Labour. He travelled abroad, being delegate of Argentine workers' in several conferences of the International Labour Organization (ILO) and took part in the formation of the ATLAS (Agrupación de Trabajadores Latinoamericanos Sindicalistas, a Latin American trade-union confederation) in 1952.

Around that time he married María Luisa Pinella, another trade-unionist, who had earned Eva Perón's trust.

José Alonso then participated, along with other unionist leaders, as representative of the CGT, to the first National Congress of Philosophy, held in Mendoza in March–April 1949, which contributed to set the bases of the Peronist movement.

He also collaborated to the creation of the FATRE (Federación Argentina de Trabajadores Rurales y Estibadores, Argentine Federation of Rural Workers and Dockworkers) and was a member of the directorship of the Fundación Eva Perón from 1952 to 1955, as well as secretary of the directorship of the EPASA, which published La Prensa and other newspapers.

Alonso was elected deputy of the Federal Capital from 1952 to 1955. He participated in the elaboration of the law on collective bargaining and the law on the pay of free day for workers working at home.

== Revolución Libertadora ==
Following the Revolución Libertadora in 1955, a military coup which ousted Perón, Alonso was detained, before being unexpectedly released on 25 June 1956. Apparently that was an error, and the junta tried to capture him again, but Alonso managed to join Perón in his exile to Venezuela. He then participated to the negotiations between Perón and Rogelio Julio Frigerio, who represented presidential candidate Arturo Frondizi of the UCRI. These negotiations resulted in Perón's decisive endorsement of Frondizi in the 1958 presidential elections.

Alonso returned to Argentina in 1957, and was again detained, for several months, following the strike in the Frigorífico Nacional Lisandro de la Torre. He then tried to re-organize his former group of textile workers, as the trade-union had been put under federal receivership by the dictatorship. Frondizi would win the February 1958 elections, and would gradually restore the CGT to its former, independent status.

In March 1960, he was elected as secretary general of the CGT, and participated in the CGT de la Resistencia, headed by the steelworker Armando Cabo (the father of Dardo Cabo, who would join the Montoneros). He authorized his union's adhesion to the 62 Organizaciones, a Peronist trade-union association created following the 1957 CGT Congress.

== General Secretary of the CGT ==
Alonso became a member of the "Commission of the 20", a unionist organization which gathered Peronists and independents, and headed the CGT following its legalization by Frondizi's government on February 28, 1961. Until 1963, the CGT was not completely institutionally normalized. President José María Guido authorized the CGT Normalization Congress in 1963. One hundred trade unions participated, and because the 62 Organizations supported José Alonso as candidate for Secretary General of the CGT, he was thus elected on February 1, 1963.

Alonso initially supported the political reforms issued under President Arturo Illia(1963-1966), such as the cancelling of oil contracts subscribed by Frondizi. But on December 4, 1963, he presented a 15 points petition list, which requested increased wages, rupture with the International Monetary Fund (IMF), active participation of workers' in the state firms and the elimination of unemployment.

A few days later, he started his speech in La Boca by declaring: "Long live 1964, because it is the year in which Perón will return to the country." He then headed the CGT's struggle against Illia's policies (Plan de Acción), between March 1964 and July 1965. On 21 May 1964, around 80 factories of Greater Buenos Aires were occupied, and 6 other strikes were organized under the CGT's leadership, followed by 3,900,000 workers and 11,000 working sites.

The plan, initially supported by independents among the CGT, then led to the resignation of the graphist and vice-secretary general of the CGT, Héctor Riego Ribas, who opposed himself to the mobilization in favor of Perón's return.

== Operativo Retorno and the break with Vandor ==
In December 1964, Alonso participated in the organization of Operativo Retorno ("Operation Return"), aimed at bringing back Perón from exile. The Operation was defeated by the incumbent government.

In 1965, he was reelected as a representative of the CGT, and began to break with the steelworker leader, Augusto Vandor, who headed the 62 Organizations and wanted a more independent stance from Perón's directives, launching the famous the mot d'ordre "A Peronism without Perón". Along with Lorenzo Pepe, Andrés Framini and Amado Olmos, Alonso established the anti-Vandor "62 Organizations Standing with Perón".

When Isabel Perón, Juan Perón's third wife, traveled to Argentina to head the opposition to Vandor, Alonso became her main counselor. Meanwhile, the government and the military supported internal struggles among the CGT, particularly following Labor Minister Rubens San Sebastián's implementation of a "divide and conquer" policy, around 1966.

Despite open support from Perón and his wife, José Alonso lost his functions at the CGT on 2 February 1966, under pressure from the Vandoristas, and was replaced by Fernando Donaires.

The CGT General Congress then named Francisco Prado as secretary general, a man from the trade union Light and Power (Luz y Fuerza), who were allies of Vandor.

Alonso then chose a new turn. Using his effective diplomatic relationship with the Roman Catholic Church in Argentina and the Armed Forces, he supported a coup d'État against Arturo Illia's elected government, and managed to reach an agreement with Vandor, both unified in common criticisms of liberal democracy.

== Onganía's dictatorship ==
Following Juan Carlos Onganía's military coup of June 28, 1966, Alonso declared: "We congratulate ourselves in having witnessed the fall of the last bourgeois liberal government, because it will never be able to establish itself here again.".

The main trade unionist leaders, Vandor, Prado, Light and Power workers' leader Juan José Taccone, and Alonso attended the inaugural of the new de facto President Onganía. Along with Rogelio Coria, José Alonso participated to the Nueva Corriente de Opinión, which, headed by Taccone, supported a "participationist" or "collaborationist" attitude toward the military regime. A new tendency, opposed to the latter, formed in the workers' movement, headed by Amado Olmos, Raimundo Ongaro, Julio Guillán, Jorge Di Pasquale, Ricardo De Luca, Atilio Santillán, and Agustín Tosco.

However, trade unionists, and in particular José Alonso, began to oppose themselves to Onganía's dictatorship following Perón 's public condemnation of the military regime in September 1966. On November 21, 1966, Alonso stated that the military's policies were handing out the country to foreign hands.

The break with the military junta became definitive with the nomination of the orthodox liberal Adalbert Krieger Vasena to the Economic and Labor Ministry, in December 1966. The government began to detain trade unionists. Francisco Prado resigned from his functions as CGT general secretary in May 1967, and called a Normalization Congress at the end of March 1968. The radical tendency, opposed to collaboration with the military, won the elections, and the print workers' leader, Raimundo Ongaro, was elected general secretary. Since the "participationists" (Vander, Alonso, etc.) retained control of the CGT's headquarters, Ongaro headed a split, leading to the creation of the CGT de los Argentinos.

In this context, the Cordobazo riots of 1969 erupted, followed by the assassination of Vandor on June 30, 1969. Ongaro's CGT de los Argentinos was outlawed, while the CGT itself was temporarily suspended. On July 4, 1970, the right-wing unionist and steelworker José Ignacio Rucci was elected general secretary of the CGT.

== Assassination ==
Alonso was assassinated on August 27, 1970, by Montoneros militants, although the crime has never been solved. He was buried in La Chacarita Cemetery.
