= General Confederation of Labour (Argentina) =

Trade union

General Confederation of Labor
- Confederación General del Trabajo
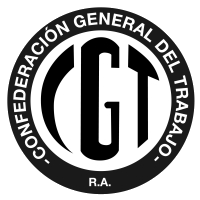

- Headquarters building
- Abbreviation: CGT
- Predecessor: Unión Sindical Argentina; Confederación Obrera Argentina
- Founded: September 27, 1930
- Headquarters: Azopardo 802; Buenos Aires, Argentina
- Location: Argentina
- Members: 7,000,000
- Key people: Carlos Acuña; Héctor Daer; Juan Carlos Schmidt
- Affiliations: ITUC
- Website: https://cgtoficial.org/

The General Confederation of Labor (in Spanish: Confederación General del Trabajo, CGT) is a national trade union federation in Argentina founded on 27 September 1930, as the result of the merger of the U.S.A. (Unión Sindical Argentina) and the C.O.A (Confederación Obrera Argentina) trade unions. Nearly one out of five employed – and two out of three unionized workers in Argentina – belong to the CGT, one of the largest labor federations in the world.

It was founded in 1930 by socialists, communists and independents to generate a plural union central. It had a socialist majority until 1945 and Peronist since then.

== The CGT during the Infamous Decade ==
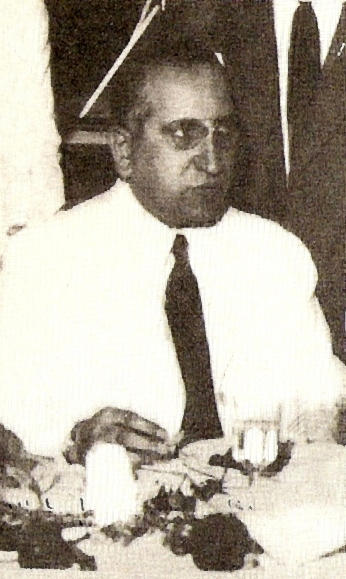
Retail Workers' Union leader Ángel Borlenghi, who became Juan Perón's closest ally in the labor movement.

The CGT was founded on 27 September 1930, the result of an agreement between the Socialist Confederación Obrera Argentina (COA) and the Syndicalist Unión Sindical Argentina (USA), which had succeeded to the FORA IX (Argentine Regional Workers' Federation, Ninth Congress); smaller, Communist-led unions later joined the CGT as well. The COA, which included the two unions covering rail transport in Argentina (Unión Ferroviaria and La Fraternidad), was the larger of the two with 100,000 members; the USA, which included, telephone, port, tramway, and public sector unions, represented 15,000.

During the Infamous Decade of the 1930s and subsequent industrial development, the CGT began to form itself as a strong union, competing with the historically anarchist FORA V (Argentine Regional Workers' Federation, Fifth Congress). Centered initially around the railroad industry, the CGT was headed in the 1930s by Luis Cerruti and José Domenech (Unión Ferroviaria); Ángel Borlenghi (Confederación General de Empleados de Comercio); and Francisco Pérez Leirós (Unión de Obreros Municipales). The CGT became the Argentine affiliate of the International Federation of Trade Unions (an organization that both USA and COA had been members of for shorter periods).

The CGT split in 1935 over a conflict between Socialists and Revolutionary Syndicalists, leading to the creation of the CGT-Independencia (Socialists & Communists) and the CGT-Catamarca (Revolutionary Syndicalists). The latter reestablished the Unión Sindical Argentina (USA) in 1937. The CGT again split in 1942, creating the CGT n°1, headed by the Socialist railroader José Domenech and opposed to Communism; and the CGT n°2, also headed by a Socialist (Pérez Leirós), which gathered Communist unions (construction, meat, print) and some important Socialist unions (such as the retail workers' union led by Borlenghi and the municipal workers' union led by Pérez Leirós).

== The CGT following the "Revolution of '43" ==
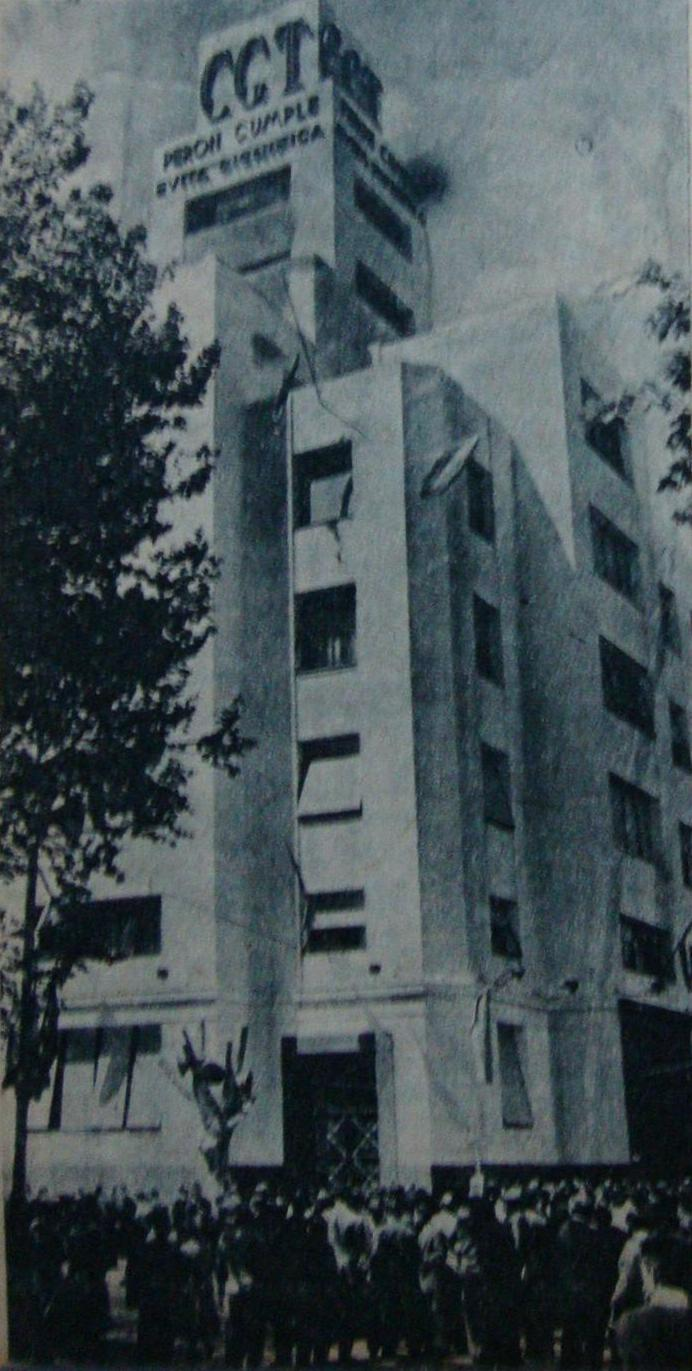
CGT headquarters in 1953

After the coup d'état of 1943, its leaders embraced the pro-working class policies of the Labour Minister, Col. Juan Perón. The CGT was again unified, due to the incorporation of many unionists who were members of the CGT n°2, dissolved in 1943 by the military government.

When Perón was separated from the government and confined on Martín García Island, the CGT called for a major popular demonstration at the Plaza de Mayo, on 17 October 1945, succeeding in releasing Perón from prison and in the call for elections. Founding on the same day the Labour Party (Partido Laborista), the CGT was one of the main support of Perón during the February 1946 elections. The Labor Party merged into the Peronist Party in 1947, and the CGT became one of the strongest arms of the Peronist Movement, as well as the only trade union recognized by Perón's government. Two CGT delegates, the Socialist Ángel Borlenghi and Juan Atilio Bramuglia were nominated Minister of Interior and Minister of Foreign Affairs, respectively. Colonel Domingo Mercante, who was perhaps the military officer with the closest ties to labor, was elected Governor of Buenos Aires (a key constituency).

The number of unionized workers grew markedly during the Perón years, from 520,000 (of which half belonged to the CGT) to over 2.5 million (all belonging to the CGT's 2,500 affiliated unions). His administration also enacted or significantly extended numerous landmark social reforms supported by the CGT, including: minimum wages; labor courts; collective bargaining rights; improvements in housing, health and education; social insurance; pensions; economic policies which encouraged import substitution industrialization; growth in real wages of up to 50%; and an increased share of employees in national income from 45% to a record 58%.

== From the 1950s to the 1980s democratic transition ==
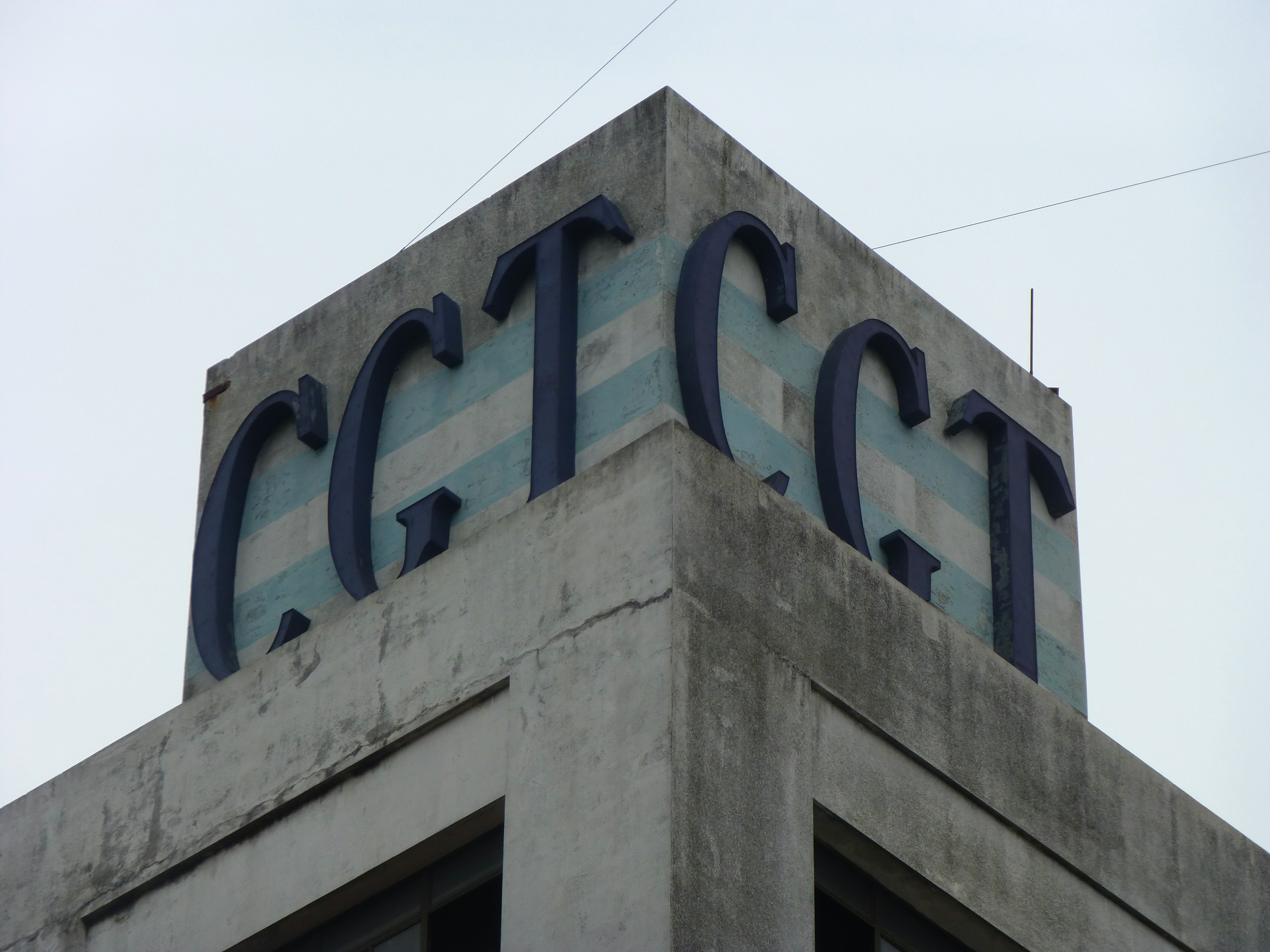
Detail of the sign on top of the building.

After the Revolución Libertadora military coup in 1955, which ousted Perón and outlawed Peronism, the CGT was banned from politics and its leadership replaced with government appointees. In response, the CGT began a destabilization campaign to end Perón's proscription and to obtain his return from exile. Amid ongoing strikes over both declining real wages and political repression, AOT textile workers' leader Andrés Framini and President Arturo Frondizi negotiated an end to six years of forced government receivership over the CGT in 1961. This concession, as well as the lifting of the Peronists' electoral ban in 1962, led to Frondizi's overthrow, however. During the 1960s, the leaders of the CGT attempted to create a "Peronism without Perón" – that is, a form of Peronism that retained the populist ideals set forth by Juan Perón, but rejected the personality cult that had developed around him in the 1940s and 1950s. The chief exponents of this strategy were the Unión Popular, founded by former Foreign Minister Juan Atilio Bramuglia (who, as chief counsel for the Unión Ferroviaria rail workers' union, had a key role in forming the alliance between labor and Perón), and UOM steelworkers' leader Augusto Vandor, who endorsed the CGT's active participation in elections against Perón's wishes and became the key figure in this latter movement. Vandor and Perón both supported President Arturo Illia's overthrow in 1966, but failed to reach an agreement with dictator Juan Carlos Onganía afterward.

While membership in CGT unions remained well below their peak before Perón's 1955 overthrow, they enjoyed unprecedented resources during the 1960s. The CGT diversified their assets (largely restituted by Frondizi) through investment banking via the Banco Sindical, captive insurance, and investments such as real estate; indeed, by 1965, union dues accounted for only a third of CGT unions' income as a whole. Besides strike funds and employee health insurance organizations (obras sociales), unions plowed these profits into member services such as clinics, retirement homes, kindergartens, libraries, technical schools, subsidized retail chains, and hotels in seaside Mar del Plata and elsewhere. A thriving balance sheet also increasingly engendered corruption among union leaders, however. Many solicited bribes from employers using the threat of strike action and one – Commercial Union leader Armando March – was convicted in 1969 of embezzling up to US$30 million from his union's accounts over the course of the decade.

=== The 1968 split between the CGT-Azopardo and the CGT de los Argentinos ===
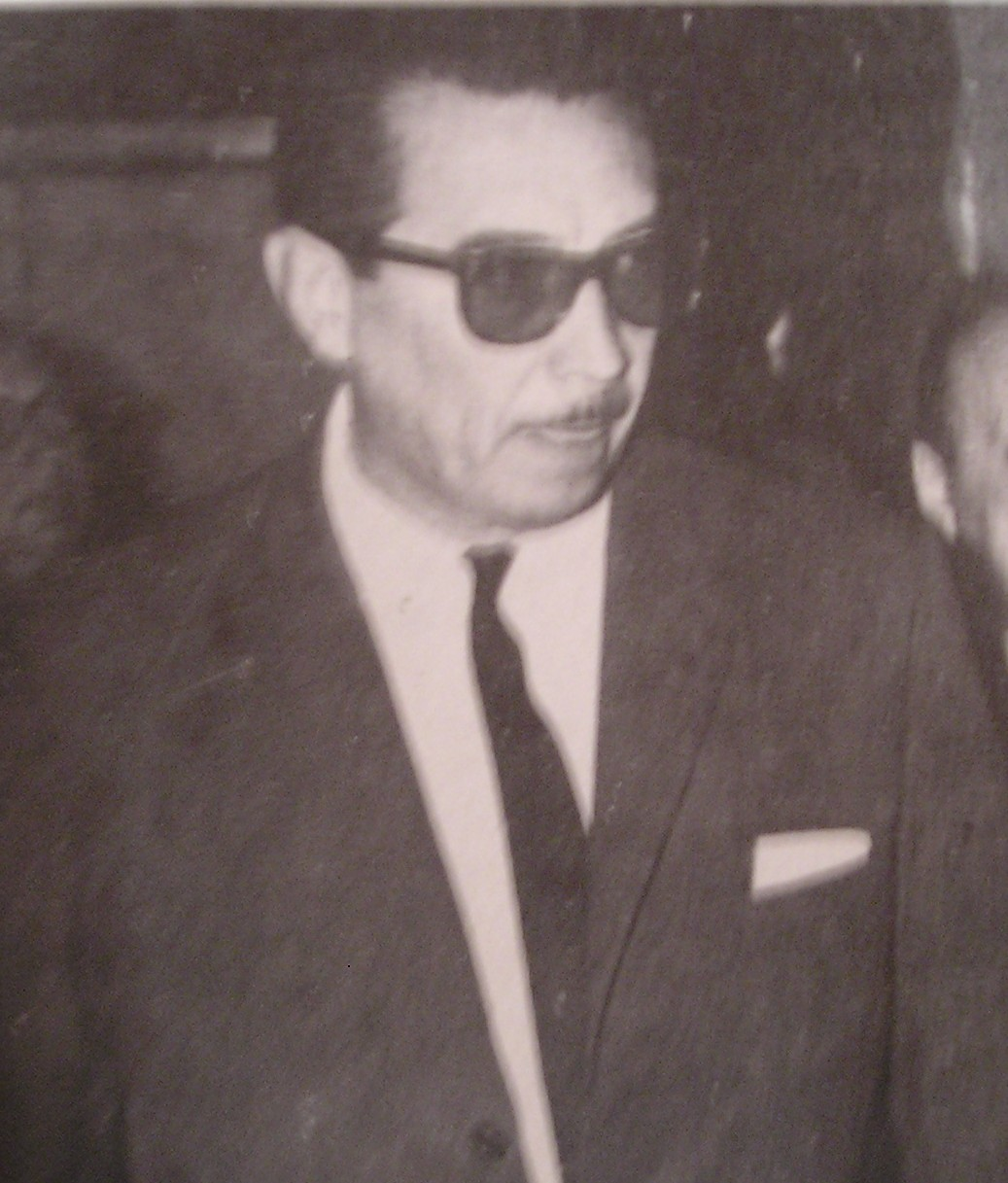
Andrés Framini, who won the lifting of six years of government receivership in 1961

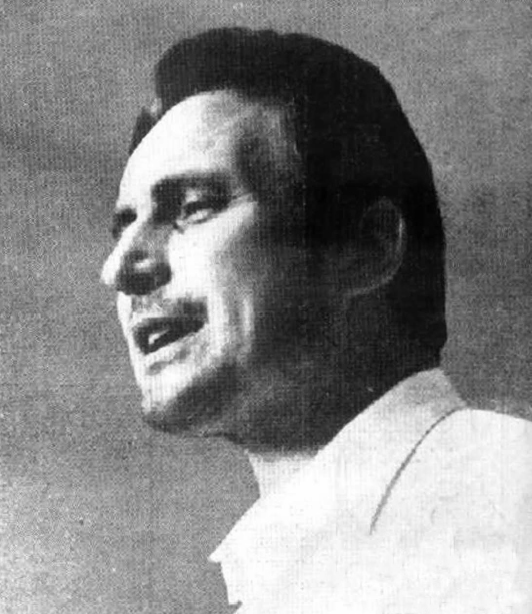
Raimundo Ongaro, who led the breakaway CGTA between 1968 and 1972

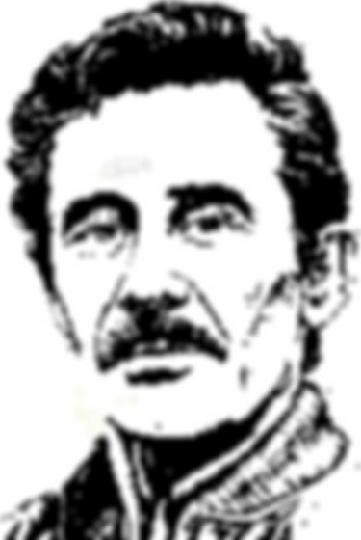
José Ignacio Rucci, whose assassination by leftists touched off the Dirty War

The election of Print Union leader Raimundo Ongaro as Secretary General in 1968 led to a new schism at the CGT. This was owed as much to the rivalry between Ongaro and other labor leaders, as to the "divide and conquer" strategy pursued by Labor Minister Rubens San Sebastián (who made the schism inevitable by refusing to certify Ongaro's election). The CGT would now be divided into the CGT-Azopardo, which gathered proponents of collaboration with the military junta (also named "participationists", including the general secretary of the CGT Augusto Vandor, as well as José Alonso and the future general secretary of the CGT-Azopardo José Ignacio Rucci); and the CGTA (CGT de los Argentinos), a more radical union headed by Ongaro. The CGTA, which also included the Córdoba Light and Power Workers' leader Agustín Tosco, played a key role in the Cordobazo student-labor uprising of 1969, during which it called for a general strike. The military junta then jailed most of the CGTA leadership, who were close to left-wing causes such as the Movement of Priests for the Third World, Liberation Theology, and the Grupo Cine Liberación film movement.

Following the failure of a 120-day strike at the Fabril Financiera industrial conglomerate, and the reconciliation between Augusto Vandor – leader of the "participationists" – and Perón, the CGTA witnessed many of its unions joining the "62 Organizations," the Peronist political front of the CGT. Perón and his delegate, Jorge Paladino, followed a cautious line of opposition to the military junta, criticizing with moderation the neoliberal policies of the junta but waiting for discontent inside the government. Despite this, in 1969 the CGTA still boasted 286,184 members; while the Nueva Corriente de Opinión (or Participationism), headed by José Alonso and Construction Union leader Rogelio Coria, boasted 596,863 members; and the CGT Azopardo, headed by Vandor, boasted 770,085 members and the majority in the Confederal Congress.

=== Assassinations of the leadership and conflict with the far left ===
The 1969 assassination of UOM Secretary General Augusto Vandor, and that of the CGT Secretary General, José Alonso, in 1970, created a power vacuum that left Vandor's conservative successor at the UOM, Lorenzo Miguel, at the CGT's leading power-broker. He used his influence to advance a rival within the UOM, José Ignacio Rucci, as the new Secretary General of the CGT. The pragmatic Miguel thus turned a rival into an ally, while impeding the more combative Light and Power workers' leader, Agustín Tosco, from rising to the powerful post.

Rucci maintained good relations with the dictatorship and earned the aging Perón's friendship. The next years were blemished by often bloody internal disputes and the fight against the leftist Montoneros, however, and in September 1973, a commando killed Secretary-General Rucci. The Montoneros, who neither claimed responsibility nor denied it, were accused of Rucci's death, and the event triggered an escalating conflict between left and right-wing Peronists spearheaded by the Montoneros and the Argentine Anticommunist Alliance, respectively. Other CGT leaders killed by leftists include Machine and Autoworkers Union head Dirk Kloosterman and Construction Union head Rogelio Coria.

=== Dirty War ===
Staunchly anti-Communist, in 1975 the CGT affiliated itself with the International Confederation of Free Trade Unions (ICFTU). Following the March 1976 coup, however, 10,000 factory delegates, of a total of 100,000, were arrested. During the Dirty War of the second half of the 1970s at least 2,700, or 30%, of the disappeared were blue-collar workers; this included numerous CGT leaders and activists, notably René Salamanca of the Córdoba Auto Workers' Union and Light and Power Union leader Oscar Smith. At first temporarily suspended, the CGT was then dissolved by the junta. Despite having been outlawed, by 1978 the CGT unions had reorganized themselves into two factions: one supporting frontal opposition to the dictatorship (known initially as the "Commission of 25"), and the other supporting negotiation with the military, named at first CNT and then CGT-Azopardo (led by Ramón Baldassini and Jorge Triaca); both the CGT-Brasil and the CGT-Azopardo were named after the streets on which the headquarters were located. CGT-Azopardo was thus able to negotiate with the military dictatorship the control of employee health insurance organizations.

The CGT and labor in general was suppressed not only directly, but by a sharp turn to the right in economic policy embodied by Economy Minister José Alfredo Martínez de Hoz. Repeated wage freezes that led to a 40% decline in real pay, as well as free trade policies and financial deregulation that damaged industrial output and domestic credit, adversely impacted the CGT. The "25" thus proclaimed the first of a series of general strikes against the dictatorship on 27 April 1979, and its leadership was jailed. Though still officially banned, these unions reconstituted the CGT as "CGT-Brasil" on 7 November 1980, and elected Beer Workers Union leader Saúl Ubaldini as secretary general. The regrouped CGT called a second general strike on 22 July 1981, as a wave of bank failures led to sharp recession, and rallied tens of thousands. Even larger numbers responded to its call on 30 March 1982, to demonstrate in favor of democracy on the Plaza de Mayo, in Buenos Aires, and in other cities throughout the country. Thousands were subsequently detained, and two days later, greatly weakened, the military junta began the Falklands War in an ill-fated attempt to bolster nationalistic feeling and unite the country behind its rule.

== The CGT since the return to democracy ==
=== Crisis and conflict ===
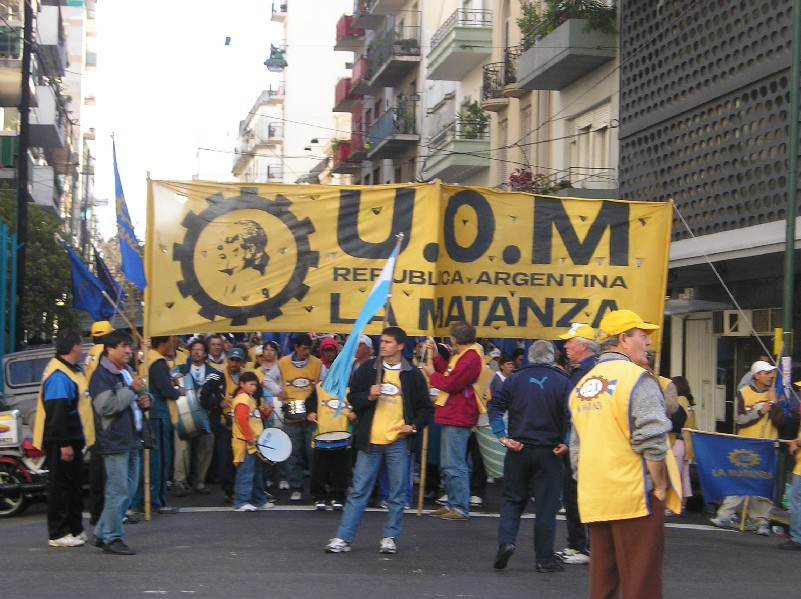
Rank-and-file from the CGT's largest section, the Steel and Metal Workers' Union, demonstrates in Buenos Aires in 2006.

Elections now imminent, the CGT was again split in 1982 over the issue of combativeness, with Plastics Union leader Jorge Triaca heading the pro-dialogue faction at Azopardo Street with the support of UOM leader Lorenzo Miguel, and Ubaldini again heading the more combative faction from Brasil Street. Disunity at the CGT and a renewed wave of strikes dovetailed into an effective campaign message by the Peronists' traditional rivals – the UCR and its nominee, Raúl Alfonsín – who denounced both the ongoing chaos and the association between Labor and the junta, criticizing a "military-labor pact." Elected President of Argentina in 1983, he failed in 1984 to pass a new law through the Senate regulating trade unions and guaranteeing freedom of association, and in negotiations with the CGT, Alfonsín conceded the position of Minister of Labor to a CGT figure (Pasta Makers' Union leader Hugo Barrionuevo).

The CGT was reunited under Ubaldini following the 1983 elections. Amid a renewed decline in real wages the CGT called 13 general strikes during Alfonsín's government, as well as hundreds of sectoral strikes. With hyperinflation corroding the economy by 1989, the CGT introduced a 26-point program to support Justicialist Party nominee Carlos Menem's presidential bid, including measures such as declaring a unilateral external debt default. Menem won the 1989 elections on a populist campaign platform, but entrusted the Ministry of Economy to the Bunge y Born company, a major agribusiness firm. This turn led to a rupture within the CGT in late 1989, though following a 1991 conference in which concern over new Economy Minister Domingo Cavallo's free-market policies ruled the agenda, the CGT was reunited under an agreement to keep the union in a stance of conditional support for the measures, which had already been reigniting economic growth. The intransigent Ubaldini was replaced by Light and Power Workers' leader Oscar Lescano.

The move caused some dissent, however, and led to the establishment of the Central de Trabajadores Argentinos (CTA), led by Víctor de Gennaro, and to the development of a dissident faction led by Truckers' Union leader Hugo Moyano, the MTA. Menem's ample victories in the 1991 mid-term elections gave momentum to his agenda of labour reforms, many of which included restricting overtime pay and easing indemnifications for layoffs, for instance. Under pressure from the rank-and-file, Lescano called for a general strike late in 1992 (the first during the Menem tenure). Increasingly marginalized within the Justicialist Party, however, he resigned the following May in favor of Steelworkers' leader Naldo Brunelli.

The CGT endorsed Menem's 1995 re-election campaign; but following a sharp recession, the CGT, CTA, and MTA reacted jointly in mid-1996 with two general strikes against the government's neoliberal policies, whose emphasis on free trade and sharp productivity gains they believed responsible for the highest unemployment rates since the great depression. Aside from these shows of force, the CGT, led by Food Processing Union leader Rodolfo Daer, remained conciliatory with the anti-labor Menem for the sake of the Justicialist Party. The party's defeats in the 1997 mid-term elections bode poorly for their chances in 1999 (elections they went on to lose).

=== Revival and new divisions ===
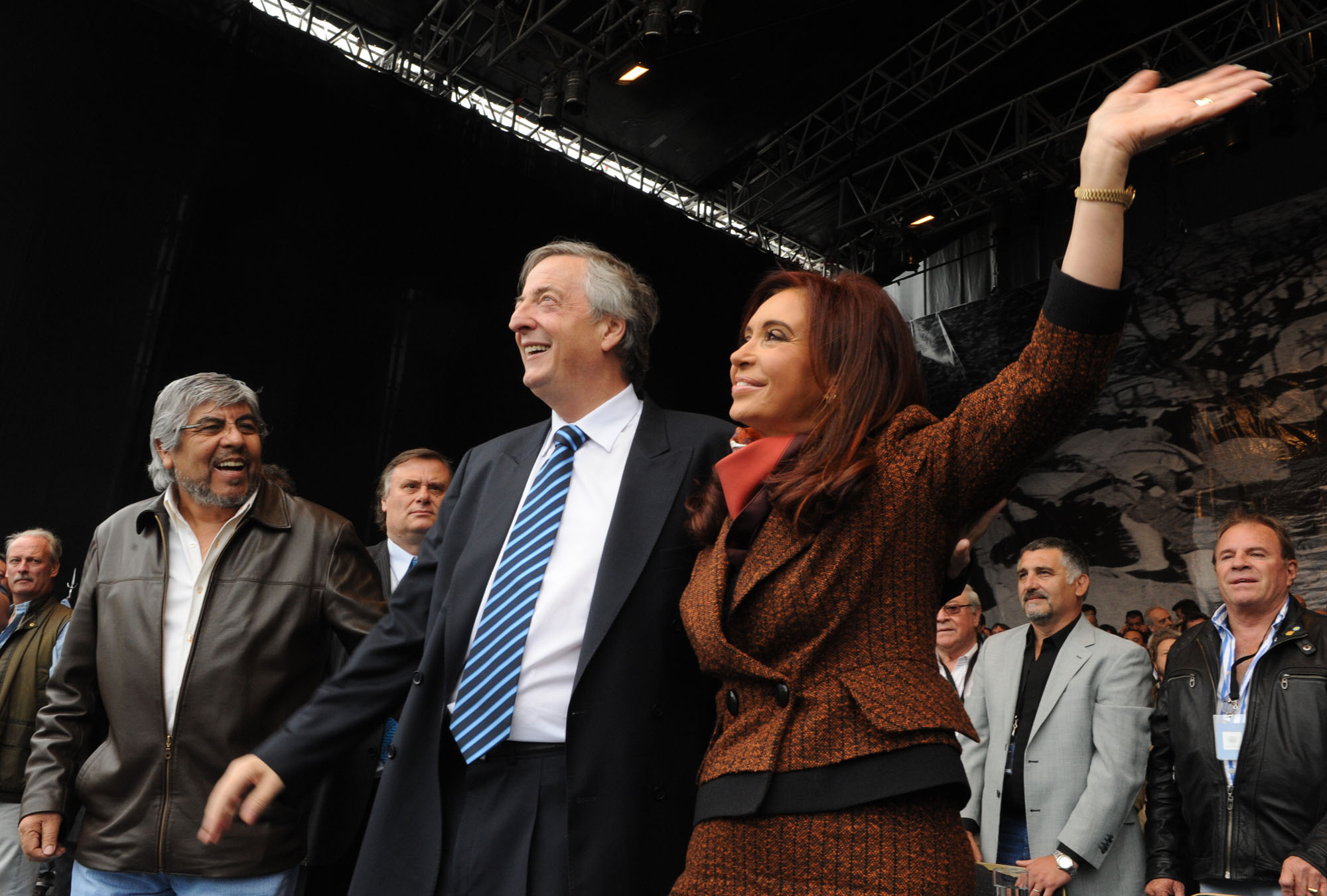
Rallying a revitalized CGT, Néstor and Cristina Kirchner lead a Loyalty Day rally in 2010 with CGT leader Hugo Moyano (left). The Kirchners' alliance with Moyano soured after the latter was sidelined during the 2011 elections.

Cohesiveness within the CGT was again strained in 2000. President Fernando de la Rúa's push for labor law flexibilization ended in scandal and undid his rapprochement with Daer and the CGT leadership; Daer's conciliatory stance, in turn, resulted in a "Rebel" CGT faction led by Julio Piumato and made Moyano's break with the CGT official. The collapse of de la Rúa's government in late 2001 made way for the parliamentary selection of former Buenos Aires Province Governor Eduardo Duhalde, whose alliance to MTA leader Hugo Moyano helped lead to the gathering of much of what remained of the CGT under his leadership. The reunited CGT elected Moyano Secretary General in 2004. Benefiting from a close alliance with Kirchnerism (in power in Argentine Government since 2003), Moyano leveraged his capacity as head of the Council on Salaries (an officially sanctioned advisory board) to secure a stronger collective bargaining position and frequent increases in the minimum wage.

From the 1990s onward, and in spite its strength as the only labor representative in many forums, the CGT has faced growing opposition from other trade unions, such as the CTA, or the left-leaning grassroots organisations of unemployed people known as Piqueteros (Picketing Men), groups first in evidence during the Menem years which later become tenuously allied with the Kirchner administrations.

The CGT, as fractious historically as its political partner the Justicialist Party, continued to be beset by disunity, moreover. Long-standing differences with Restaurant Workers' leader Luis Barrionuevo led to a new schism within the CGT during 2008, when Barrionuevo led 40 unions into a "Blue-and-White" CGT. Moyano secured his reelection as CGT head, however, and retained the support of 134 unions, including most of the larger ones. His alliance with Kirchnerism eroded quickly after the 2011 elections, however. Largely sidelined during the campaign and denied demands to include more CGT officials in the Front for Victory party list for Congress, Moyano's alliance with the Kirchner administration effectively ended with a series of strikes called by the Trucking Workers' Union (led by his son, Pablo) during June 2012, and by July Moyano had lost the support of most of the larger unions. These latter rallied behind Steelworkers' Union (UOM) leader Antonio Caló, who was elected Secretary General of the "official" CGT in October while Moyano continued to lead the now "dissident" CGT in a loose alliance with Barrionuevo and Pablo Micheli of the Dissident CTA.

The four-year schism ended in 2016 following a series of austerity measures decreed by newly elected President Mauricio Macri. Representatives of most CGT unions agreed on a framework on July 22 that would reunify the CGT under a triumvirate led by Rodolfo Daer, Juan Carlos Schmidt, and Carlos Acuña. Each represents the three CGT factions: Daer, the CGT-Alsina led by Antonio Caló; Schmidt, the CGT-Azopardo led by Hugo Moyano; and Acuña, the Blue & White CGT (the most conservative) led by Luis Barrionuevo. The triumvirate was formally sworn in on August 22.

Upon the election of Javier Milei and subsequent protests against him, CGT, with its now seven million members, led a national general strike.

== Leadership ==
Secretary General	Union	Tenure	Notes
Luis Cerruti	Railway	1930 — 1936	
José Domenech	Railway	1936 — 1942	
José Domenech (CGT I); Francisco Pérez Leirós (CGT II)	Railway; Municipal	1942 — 1943	Schism
Ramón Seijas	Tramway	1943 — 1944	
Alcides Montiel	Beer	1944 — 1945	
Silverio Pontieri	Railway	1945 — 1946	
Luis Gay	Telephone	1946 — 1947	
José Espejo	Food Processing	1947 — 1952	
Eduardo Vuletich	Pharmacy	1952 — 1955	
Andrés Framini; Luis Natalini; Dante Viel	Textile; Light and Power; State	1955	Triumvirate
Alberto Patrón Laplacette		1955 — 1958	Military Receivership
Osvaldo Tercuare		1958 — 1961	Government Receivership
Andrés Framini; Augusto Vandor; José Alonso	Textile; Metallurgy; Garment	1961 — 1963	Committee of 20
José Alonso	Garment	1963 — 1965	
Fernando Donaires	Paper	1965 — 1966	
Francisco Prado	Light and Power	1966 — 1968	
Vicente Roqué (CGT Azopardo); Raimundo Ongaro (CGTA)	Flour; Print	1968 — 1970	Schism
José Ignacio Rucci (CGT Azopardo); Raimundo Ongaro (CGTA)	Metallurgy; Print	1970 — 1973	Schism
Adelino Romero	Textile	1973 — 1974	
Segundo Palma	Construction	1974 — 1975	
Casildo Herreras	Textile	1975 — 1976	
Ramón Baldassini (CNT); Saúl Ubaldini (CGT Brasil)	Postal; Beer	1978 — 1980	Schism of an ad hoc nature (CGT banned by dictatorship in 1976)
Saúl Ubaldini	Beer	1980 — 1989	Jorge Triaca (Plastics) led a rival CGT-Azopardo in 1982-83
Saúl Ubaldini (CGT Azopardo); Guerino Andreoni (CGT San Martín)	Beer; Commerce	1989 — 1992	Schism
Oscar Lescano; José Rodríguez; José Pedraza	Light and Power; Machinery; Railway	1992 — 1993	Executive Committee
Naldo Brunelli	Metallurgy	1993 — 1994	
Antonio Cassia	Petroleum	1994 — 1995	
Gerardo Martínez	Construction	1995 — 1996	
Rodolfo Daer	Food Processing	1996 — 2000	
Rodolfo Daer (Official CGT); Hugo Moyano (Dissident CGT)	Food Processing; Trucking	2000 — 2002	Schism
Hugo Moyano; Susana Rueda; José Luis Lingieri	Trucking; Health; Water Works	2002 — 2004	Triumvirate
Hugo Moyano	Trucking	2004 — 2012	
Antonio Caló (CGT Alsina); Hugo Moyano (CGT Azopardo)	Metallurgy; Trucking	2012 — 2016	Schism
Carlos Acuña; Héctor Daer; Juan Carlos Schmidt	Valets; Health; Dredging and Signal	2016 —	Triumvirate

== Leading CGT unions ==
Union	Sector	Leader	Members (1963)	Members (2010)
Federación Argentina de Empleados de Comercio y Servicios (Argentine Federation of Commerce and Services Employees)	Commerce	Armando Cavallieri	200,001	432,000
Confederación de Trabajadores de la Educación de la República Argentina (Confederation of Education Workers of the Argentine Republic)	Education	Sonia Alesso	(founded in 1973)	294,000
Unión Obrera de la Construcción de la República Argentina (Construction Workers Union of the Argentine Republic)	Construction	Gerardo Martínez	95,000	221,000
Unión del Personal Civil de la Nación (Union of the Civil Personnel of the Nation)	Civil Service	Andrés Rodríguez	190,000	219,000
Federación Nacional de la Alimentación (National Food Federation)	Food Processing	Luis Morán	37,000	189,000
Federación de Asociaciones de Trabajadores de la Sanidad Argentina (Federation of Associations of Argentine Health Workers)	Health	Susana Rueda	38,000	187,000
Unión Obrera Metalúrgica (Metallurgical Workers Union)	Metalworking	Antonio Caló	219,000	170,000
Unión de Trabajadores del Turismo, Hoteleros y Gastronómicos de la República Argentina (Union of Tourism, Hotel and Gastronomic Workers of the Argentine Republic)	Restaurants	Luis Barrionuevo	60,000	162,000
Federación Nacional de Trabajadores Camioneros y Empleados del Transporte (National Federation of Trucker Workers and Transportation Employees)	Transport	Hugo Moyano	22,000	150,000
Asociación Trabajadores del Estado (Association of State Workers)	State	Julio Godoy	150,000	143,000
Unión Argentina de Trabajadores Rurales y Estibadores (Argentine Union of Rural Workers and Longshoremen)	Rural	Gerónimo Venegas	35,000	117,000
Sindicato de Mecánicos y Afines del Transporte Automotor (Union of Automotive Transport Mechanics and Related Workers)	Machinery and Auto	Ricardo Pignanelli	40,000	89,000
Federación Argentina de Trabajadores de Luz y Fuerza (Argentine Federation of Light and Power Workers)	Utilities	Guillermo Moser	41,000	
Unión Tranviarios Automotor (Automotive Tramways Union)	Buses	Roberto Fernández	50,000	56,000
Asociación Obrera Textil (Textile Workers Association)	Textile	Jorge Lobais	150,000	43,000

== See also ==
- Trade unions in Argentina
- Ángel Borlenghi
- Juan Atilio Bramuglia
- Juan Perón
- José Alonso (trade unionist)
- Augusto Vandor
- José Ignacio Rucci
- Hugo Moyano
