= United Nations Security Council Resolution 318 =

UN Security Council Resolution 318
- Date: 28 July 1972
- Meeting no.: 1,655
- Code: S/RES/318 (Document)
- Subject: Question concerning the situation in Southern Rhodesia
- Voting summary: 14 voted for; None voted against; 1 abstained
- Result: Adopted

Security Council composition
- Permanent members: China; France; Soviet Union; United Kingdom; United States
- Non-permanent members: Argentina; Belgium; Guinea; India; Italy; Japan; Panama; Somalia; Sudan; Yugoslavia

United Nations Security Council Resolution 318, adopted on July 28, 1972, after reaffirming previous resolutions on the topic, the Council approved the recommendations of the committee established in resolution 253. The Council then condemned all acts violating the provisions of the previous resolutions, called upon all states continuing to have economic and other relations with Southern Rhodesia to stop immediately and demanded that all member states scrupulously carry out their obligations under the previous resolutions. The Resolution then requested the Secretary-General provide all appropriate assistance to the committee established in resolution 253.

The resolution passed with 14 votes to none, with one abstention from the United States.

== See also ==
- List of United Nations Security Council Resolutions 301 to 400 (1971–1976)
- Unilateral Declaration of Independence (Rhodesia)
- United Nations Security Council Resolution 314
