= Grupo Cine Liberación =

Argentine film movement

The Grupo Cine Liberación ("The Liberation Film Group") was an Argentine film movement that took place during the end of the 1960s. It was founded by Fernando Solanas, Octavio Getino and Gerardo Vallejo. The idea of the group was to give rise to historical, testimonial and film-act cinema, to contribute to the debate and offer an open space for dialogue and freedom of expression that was illegal at that time. With strong anti-imperialist ideas, he harshly criticized Peronism and neocolonialism. In the subsequent years other films directors (grupo Realizadores de Mayo, Enrique and Nemesio Juárez, Pablo Szir, etc.) revolved around the active core of the Cine Liberación group.

Along with Raymundo Gleyzer's Cine de la Base in Argentina, the Brazilian Cinema Novo, the Cuban revolutionary cinema and the Bolivian film director Jorge Sanjinés, the Grupo Cine Liberación was part of the Tercer Cine movement. The name of Tercer Cine (or Third Film, in an obvious allusion to the Third World) was explicitly opposed to "First World" cinema, that is, Hollywood, and was also contrasted with auteur film, deciding to engage itself more explicitly in the social and political movements.

From his exile in Francoist Spain, Juan Peron sent in 1971 two letters to Octavio Getino, one congratulating him for this work of Liberation Film Group, and another concerning two documentaries that were to be done with him (La Revolución Justicialista and Actualización política y doctrinaria).

The graphist Raimundo Ongaro, also founder of the CGT de los Argentinos (CGTA) trade-union, was also close to this movement.

== Theory and practice ==
One of the principles of the Grupo Cine Liberación was to produce anonymous films, in an endeavour to favorite collective creation processes, to create a collective discourse, and also to protect themselves from political repression. According to Lucio Mufud, the collective authorship movement of the 1960s and 1970s was "among other things, about erasing any authorial mark. It concerned itself, on the one hand, with protecting the militant creators from state repression. But it was also about having their voice coincide with the 'voice of the people.'" Another similar group included the Grupo Cine de la Base (The Base Film Group), which included the film director Raymundo Gleyzer, who produced Los Traidores (The Traitors, 1973), and was later "disappeared" during the dictatorship.

Both Grupo Cine Liberación and Grupo Cine de la Base were especially concerned with Latin American integration, neo-colonialism and advocated the use of violence as one of the alternative possible means against hegemonic power.

== La Hora de los hornos (1968) ==
In 1968, the Cuban film director Santiago Álvarez collaborated with Octavio Getino and Fernando Solanas on the four-hour documentary La hora de los hornos ("The Hour of the furnaces"), about foreign imperialism in South America. The title of the film itself comes from a writing by 19th Century Cuban poet and independence leader José Martí, who proclaimed, in an eponymous manifest, the need to start the independence war against Spain again.

Among the other subjects explored in this film were the musical and cultural scene in Latin America and the dictatorships which gripped the region – at the same time, several Latin American authors, including the Mexican Carlos Fuentes and the Argentine Julio Cortázar, initiated the Dictator Novel genre. The movie was diffused only in alternative circuits, both by choice and by censorship obligations.

== Ya es tiempo de violencia (1969) ==
In 1969, the film director Enrique Juárez thus anonymously produced Ya es tiempo de violencia (Now is the Time for Violence), mainly concerned with the events of the May 1969 Cordobazo riots and the assassination of the trade-unionist Augusto Vandor on 30 June 1969. Other images included those of the massive funerals of Emilio Jáuregui, another trade-unionist shelled three days before Vandor's death during a demonstration in protest of Nelson Rockefeller's (owner of Miramax there) arrival to Argentina.

The film, entirely made clandestinely, criticized Juan Carlos Onganía's dictatorship and the media's official discourse. Ya es tiempo de violencia was thought to have been destroyed in the turmoil of the 1976 coup d'état and the "Dirty War," but a copy of it was in fact stored by the Cuban film institute Icaic. In 2007, the film was brought back to Buenos Aires by Fernando Krichmar, a member of the Grupo Cine Insurgente (Insurgent Cine Group), and Aprocinain (Asociación para el Apoyo Patrimonial Audiovisual y la Cinemateca Nacional) made another copy of it to insure its preservation.

In this film documentary, Enrique Juárez used a multiplicity of voice-overs (among which an anonymous narrator and an anonymous Peronist activist, among others) against censorship exerted by the hegemonic discourse – the voices are in fact those of Juárez himself, the actor Héctor Alterio, etc.

The film itself was almost exclusively composed from media images, with the editing used to contradict the official discourse by using contradictory voices and images (i.e. a civil servant of Juan Carlos Onganía's dictatorship states that everything is well, contradicted by images showing the Cordobazo riots). Furthermore, the voice-over often address itself directly to the spectator, urging him to take action.

== El Camino hacia la muerte del viejo Reales (1968) ==
El Camino hacia la muerte del viejo Reales was mainly produced by Gerardo Vallejo, and depicted the exploitation of sugarcane workers. Persecuted by Ongania's dictatorship, Vallejo fled to Rome and finished the film there. Although the movie won several awards abroad, it was censored in Argentina in 1972, and diffused in clandestine networks. It only re-appeared legally due to a decree passed by Juan Peron's after his return in 1973 to Argentina. Vallejo returned from exile after Peron's return, but he was again forced into exile after a bomb planted by the Argentine Anticommunist Alliance exploded in his home in December 1974.

== Films ==
- Ya es tiempo de violencia (1969, completely anonymous, produced by Enrique Juárez)
- La desconocida (1962), also by Enrique Juárez
- El Camino hacia la muerte del viejo Reales (1968, by Octavio Getino, Fernando Solanas and Gerardo Vallejo)
- Perón, la revolución justicialista (1971, by Octavio Getino and Fernando Solanas)

== See also ==
- Grupo Cine de la Base (The Base Film Group), a similar contemporary group
- Colectivo Situaciones, modern groups inspired by these collective creation principles
- Grupo Alavio, modern group inspired by these principles
- AgoraTV, modern Brazilian group inspired by Cine Liberación
- Films depicting Latin American military dictatorships
- The Dictator Novel
- Underground film
