= United Nations Security Council Resolution 314 =

United Nations Security Council resolution

UN Security Council Resolution 314
- Date: 28 February 1972
- Meeting no.: 1,645
- Code: S/RES/314 (Document)
- Subject: Question concerning the situation in Southern Rhodesia
- Voting summary: 13 voted for; None voted against; 2 abstained
- Result: Adopted

Security Council composition
- Permanent members: China; France; Soviet Union; United Kingdom; United States
- Non-permanent members: Argentina; Belgium; Guinea; India; Italy; Japan; Panama; Somalia; Sudan; Yugoslavia

United Nations Security Council Resolution 314, adopted on February 28, 1972, concerned that certain states were not complying with resolution 253, the Council decided that the sanctions against Southern Rhodesia set out in 253 would remain fully in force. It also urged all states to implement fully resolution 253 and declared that any legislation passed or act taken by any state with a view to permitting the importation of any commodity from Southern Rhodesia falling into the scope of 253 (chrome ore was specifically mentioned) would undermine the sanctions and be contrary to the state's obligations under the United Nations Charter.

The Council drew the attention of all States to the need for increasing vigilance in implementing the provisions and requested the Committee established in 253 meet and submit a report not later than April 15 recommending ways and means by which the implementation of the sanctions would be ensured and requested the Secretary-General to provide all appropriate assistance to the Committee.

The resolution was adopted by 13 votes to none, with two abstentions from the United Kingdom and United States.

== See also ==
- List of United Nations Security Council Resolutions 301 to 400 (1971–1976)
- Unilateral Declaration of Independence (Rhodesia)
