= Movement of Priests for the Third World =

Argentine Catholic movement

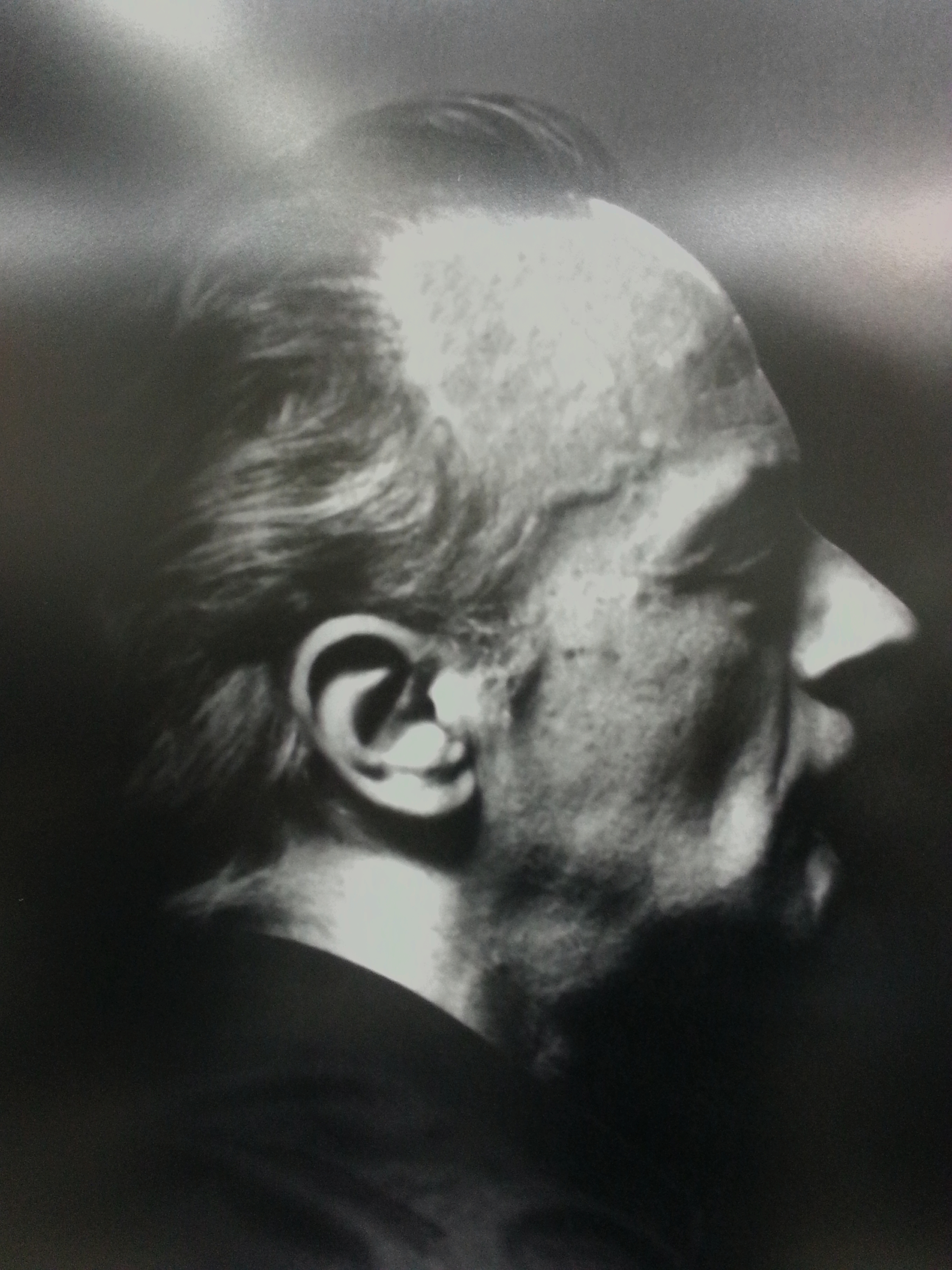
Lucio Gera

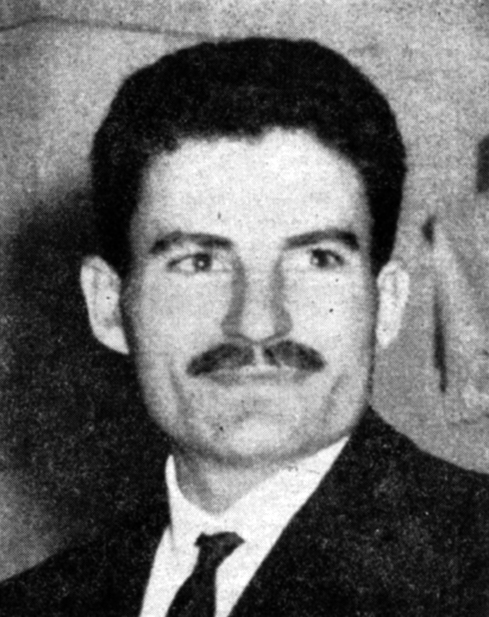
Gerardo Ferrari

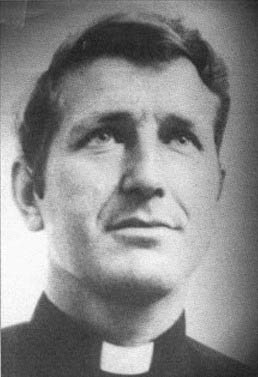
Carlos Mugica

On the left is the theologian Lucio Gera, author of the MSTM Theological Reflection and main inspirer of their Theology. In the center Gerardo Ferrari, a former Third World seminarian who joined the FAP in 1969 and was assassinated on June 13 of that year.On the right is Carlos Mugica, a Third World priest, assassinated on May 11, 1974.

The Movement of Priests for the Third World (Spanish: Movimiento de Sacerdotes para el Tercer Mundo, MSTM) was a tendency among the Catholic Church in Argentina which aimed at combining reform ideas which followed the Second Vatican Council with a strong political and social participation. Formed mainly by priests active in villas miserias (shantytowns) and workers' neighborhoods, the Movement of Priests for the Third World was an important canal for social action between 1967 and 1976, close to Leftwing Peronism and, at times, Marxism. It was also close to the CGT de los Argentinos, which was strongly active in the 1969 Cordobazo demonstrations against Juan Carlos Onganía's military dictatorship.

== Creation ==
The CELAM declaration of Medellín (August 1968) tied poverty in the Third World to exploitation by multinational firms of industrialized countries, supporting liberation theology. The Medellín declaration was issued at a time when the Argentine Catholic Church was already in turmoil. Three priests from Buenos Aires, Héctor Botán, Miguel Ramondetti and Rodolfo Ricciardelli had published, a month earlier, the Manifiesto de los 18 Obispos (Manifest of the 18 Bishops), which proposed, among other suggestions, the creation of the MSTM. The first encounter took place in May 1968, with the tacit authorization of the bishops Guillermo Bolatti, Enrique Angelelli, Alberto Devoto, Jerónimo Podestá, Jaime de Nevares, Adolfo Tortolo and Vicente Faustino Zazpe, although none of them would associate themselves with the Movement of Priests for the Third World.

Along with laics, the MSTM dedicated itself to social welfare projects, as well as supporting workers' claims, at a time when the military dictatorship of Onganía had suspended the right to strike as well as other political rights. The MSTM's relationship with trade unions lead many of its members to gravitate towards Peronism, and even Socialism.

In December 1969, more than 20 priests, members of the MSTM, marched on the Casa Rosada to present to Onganía a petition pleading him to abandon the eradication plan of villas miserias.

The same year, the Movement issued a declaration supporting Socialist revolutionary movements, which led to the Catholic hierarchy, through Juan Carlos Aramburu, coadjutor Archbishop of Buenos Aires, to proscribe priests from making political or social declarations.

One of the MSTM statements advocated socialization of the means of production (i.e. abolition of private ownership of the means of production), leading to its condemnation by the Catholic hierarchy.

== Internal conflicts and dissolving ==
Various political conflicts inside the MTSM, with some advocating a more centrist version of Peronism, others a more horizontal organisation, and yet others supporting Guevarism rather than Peronism, led to a rupture in the movement in its 1973 encounter. Although the priests did not cease individual actions, the MSTM ceased to function as a united front.

Along with the increase in repression during the Dirty War, the movement lost any capacity for action and finally dissolved itself a few years after Juan Perón's death. Although a few of its members left the clergy, in general to marry, the majority remained priests. A 1988 study estimated that 67% of its members had kept their clerical status.
