= Sergio Bagú =

Argentine Marxist historian, sociologist and political philosopher

Sergio Bagú (January 10, 1911 – December 2, 2002) was an Argentine Marxist historian, sociologist and political philosopher.

Bagú, who was born in Buenos Aires, was a lecturer at the University of Illinois, Middlebury College and the University of Buenos Aires. As a university professor, he was exiled by the military junta in Argentina following the 1966 Argentine Revolution. He died in Mexico City.

His most important book Economía de la sociedad colonial (The Economy of Colonial Society, 1949) was one of the first to challenge the idea of Latin American feudalism (dominant among the Communist parties of that time) and emphasize the capitalist dimension of the colonization of America.
