= General Confederation of Labour of the Argentines =

The CGTA (CGT de los Argentinos, or General Confederation of Labour of the Argentines) was an offshoot of the General Confederation of Labour created during the Normalisation Congress of the CGT of 28–30 March 1968, and which lasted until 1972.

Behind the figure of the graphist Raimundo Ongaro (also close to the film movement Grupo Cine Liberación), it gathered opponents to the "participationists" (the latter including Augusto Vandor, then leader of the CGT, José Ignacio Rucci, José Alonso, etc.) who supported collaboration with Juan Carlos Onganía's military dictatorship (1966–1970). The CGTA gathered many unionist delegates who refused to participate to the Normalisation Congress, opposing collaboration with the junta. It had support from various artists, among whom Rodolfo Walsh, author of the "Program of 1st of May" of the CGTA and chief editor of its weekly. The CGTA was also close to the clerical Movimiento de Sacerdotes para el Tercer Mundo, a group of priests close to the Liberation Theology, forming one of the first model of Neoperonism.

The CGTA supported the more radical unions' branches (ports, oil, sugar industry, etc.), quickly establishing national scale. It was headed in Cordoba by the leader of the Cordobese trade union Luz y Fuerza, Agustín Tosco. They took an important part in the Cordobazo uprising and the call for a general strike, which occurred on 30 June 1969, hours following Augusto Vandor's assassination. Thereafter, most of its leaders, including Raimundo Ongaro, Agustín Tosco, Elpidio Torres, Lorenzo Pepe, etc., were jailed.

Following the failure of a 120 days strike at the Fabril Financiera, and the reconciliation between Augusto Vandor, leader of the "participationists", with Juan Perón, the CGTA witnessed many of its unions joining the 62 Organisations, the Peronist political front of the CGT. Despite this, in 1969, the CGTA still boasted 286,184 members, while the Nueva Corriente de Opinión (or Participationism), headed by José Alonso and Rogelio Coria boasted 596,863 members and the CGT Azopardo, headed by Vandor, boasted 770,085 members and the majority in the Confederal Congress.
