= Saúl Ubaldini =

Argentine labor leader and politician

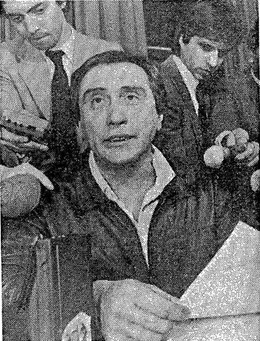
- Ubaldini in 1983

National Deputy
- In office 10 December 1997 – 10 December 2005
- Constituency: Buenos Aires

Personal details
- Born: Saúl Edólver Ubaldini; December 29, 1936 Mataderos, Buenos Aires, Argentina
- Died: November 19, 2006 (aged 69) Buenos Aires, Argentina
- Occupation: Politician and activist

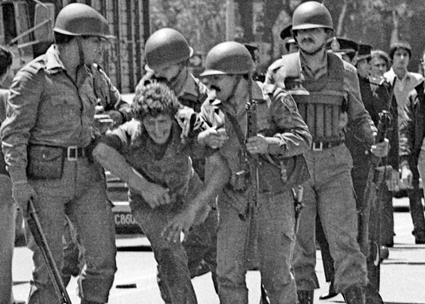
1981 protests at San Cayetano, Buenos Aires

Saúl Edólver Ubaldini (December 29, 1936 – November 19, 2006) was an Argentine labor leader and parliamentarian for the Peronist Justicialist Party.

Ubaldini was born in the Buenos Aires barrio of Mataderos, the son of a meat worker and a seamstress. He worked in the processing plants and became involved in the trade union. In 1969 he started work at a small yeast factory and seven years later he was elected the Secretary-General of the small union of beer-industry workers. During the Proceso dictatorship, he was elected general secretary of the CGT, the trade union umbrella body, in 1979. In the years that followed, he led the "Brasil" fraction of the CGT, which showed a harder line against the military than its "CGT Azopardo" counterpart. The names came from the addresses of their respective headquarters. He led a march of 10,000 protesters against the dictatorship in 1981, the first large protest of that period.

When democracy returned, he became leader of the CGT in 1986. From this position he launched 13 general strikes against Radical Raúl Alfonsín's government. However, the CGT's militancy subsided once Peronism was back in power. In 1989 Ubaldini was displaced as head of the CGT by supporters of President Carlos Menem. Although he had backed Menem's election campaign publicly, Ubaldini opposed Menem's free market reforms and refused to vacate the CGT building.

In 1993, Ubaldini stood to be Governor of Buenos Aires Province, heavily defeated by the Menemist Eduardo Duhalde. He was elected in 1997 and again in 2001 as a national deputy for Buenos Aires Province. In his last role he assisted the Planning Minister Julio de Vido during Nestor Kirchner's presidency. He had also been vice president of the international trade union movement CIOSL (now known as Trade Union Confederation of the Americas).

He died of lung cancer, aged 69, in Buenos Aires.
