= Cordobazo =

1969 civil uprising in Córdoba, Argentina

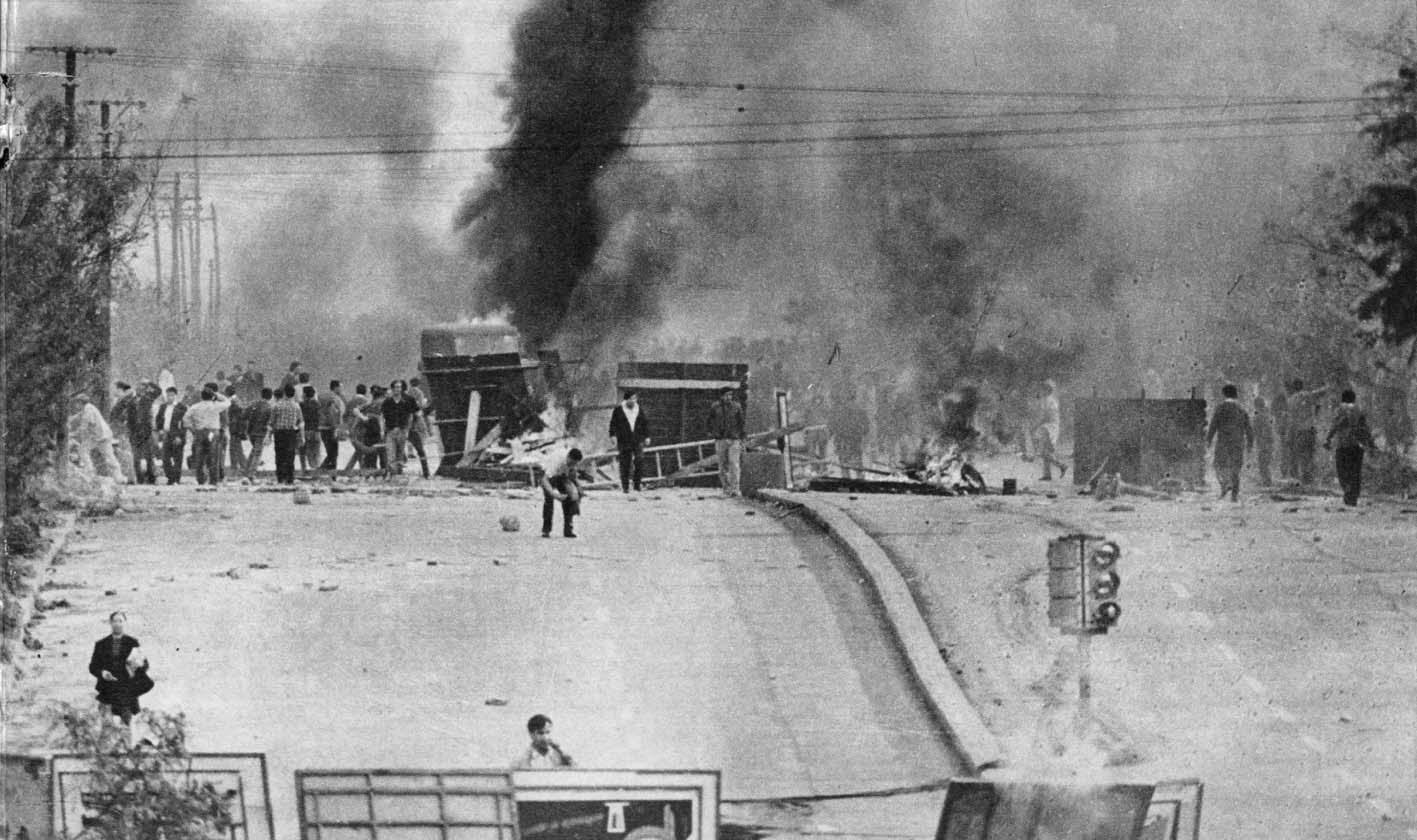
- Cordobazo uprising
- Date: 19–30 May 1969
- Location: Córdoba, Argentina

Parties
Government of Argentina	(Argentina) Protesters

The Cordobazo was a civil uprising in the city of Córdoba, Argentina at the end of May 1969. It occurred a few days after the Rosariazo protests erupted in the Santa Fe Province against the military dictatorship of General Juan Carlos Onganía. With its element of radical student participation, the Cordobazo is often viewed as a continuation of the global protests of 1968.

Starting in mid-May 1969, a series of Argentine strikes and protests brought police repression, which triggered a wider insurrection. The two pivotal days of the Cordobazo were 29 and 30 May 1969. That is when the labor union CGT, headed in Córdoba by Agustín Tosco, called for a national strike immediately after the city of Córdoba initiated a general strike. The historian James Brennan characterized the Cordobazo as a "fateful step toward the violent climax the country would experience" in the Argentine coup d'état of 1976.

== Context ==
General Onganía had taken power during the 1966 coup, self-named Revolución Argentina (Argentine Revolution), which had toppled President Arturo Illia (Radical Civic Union, UCR). Onganía's regime immediately suspended the right to strike, froze workers' wages, deactivated the Commission on Minimum Wages, while his Minister of Economy, Adalbert Krieger Vasena, decreed a 40% devaluation of the peso. The age of retirement was also extended.

Onganía had also implemented the "law on repression of Communism" and had ordered the Dirección de Investigación de Políticas Antidemocráticas (DIPA) political police to detain political activists and trade-unionists who did not care to cooperate with him in the "participationist" policies, and, considering universities as "centers of subversion and communism", had also reneged on the 1918 University Reform (which had found its origins in students' protests in Córdoba), violently expelling from universities teachers and students in the Noche de los Bastones Largos.

Furthermore, Onganía was attempting to impose corporatism in Argentina. In this context, the important industrial hub of Córdoba was one of the experimental place of corporatist policies, implemented by the appointed governor Carlos Caballero.

== Popular uprising ==
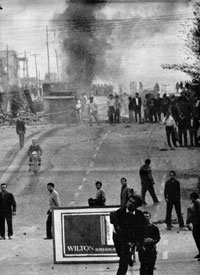
29 May 1969

These unpopular measures led to increasing strikes and protests in the country. At the beginning of May '69, a succession of strikes and popular assemblies occurred in Córdoba, which were harshly repressed by the provincial and national military authorities of the junta.

On 13 May 1969, in Tucumán, former workers of a sugar mill took the factory and its manager as hostage, asking for overdue payments.

On 14 May, in Córdoba, automobile industry workers protested the elimination of the Saturday rest.

On 15 May, the university of Corrientes increased the price of food tickets in its cafeteria fivefold, and the ensuing protest ended up with one student, Juan José Cabral, killed by the police (see Correntinazo).

On 17 May, the student Adolfo Bello was killed during a protest in Rosario (see Rosariazo).

On 21 May, the police killed the 15-year-old student Luis Blanco during a silent march of 4,000 persons in Rosario, in commemoration of Bello's death. Rosario is declared by the authorities an emergency zone under military jurisdiction.

On 29 May 1969, the police shot dead the first victim of the Cordobazo, Máximo Mena, which triggered further demonstrations and rioting. Progressively, the population took control of most of the city, setting up barricades to defend themselves. They burnt several administrative centers, as well as the headquarters of the foreign firms, which symbolized Vasena's economic policies, of Citroën and Xerox, although they then accompanied the firefighters in order to impede the fire from extending itself to other city blocks.

On the night of 29 to 30 May 1969, Onganía decided to send the military to crush the uprising. Meanwhile, the headquarters of the CGT de los Argentinos (CGTA, an offshoot of the General Confederation of Labour created in 1968 over opposition to the collaborationist stance adopted by the general secretary of the CGT, Augusto Vandor) were searched and its leaders arrested. Thus, Agustín Tosco, one of the main leaders of the CGTA, was arrested and condemned by the War Council.

On the following days, official medias reflected the official vision of the events, allegedly a conspiracy of international communism.

== Consequences ==
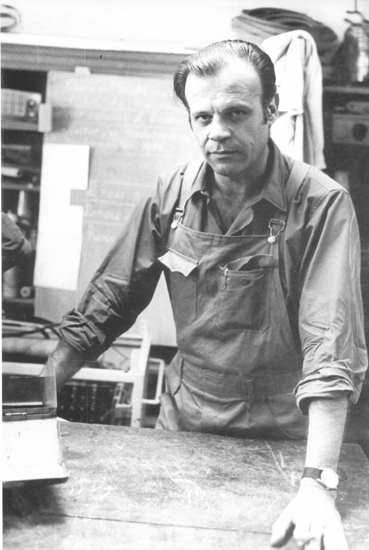
Union leader Agustín Tosco

The Cordobazo immediately influenced events in other parts of the country, where violent demonstrations also occurred, and favored the influence of trade unionists radically opposed to the dictatorship. This latter current, known as sindicalismo clasista, came to head the SMATA trade union of Córdoba, as well as the autonomous unions of Fiat Concord and Fiat Materfer (SITRAC-SITRAM). Workers' leaders of Córdoba, such as Agustín Tosco, René Salamanca, Gregorio Flores and José Francisco Páez, played a role on the national political stage. In Salta, Armando Jaime also headed the CGT clasista.

It also underlined two new facts in Argentine politics: on one hand, the alliance of the students' movement with the workers, and on the other hand, the predominance of the interior (or of the provinces of Argentina) on the capital, Buenos Aires.

The Cordobazo also had lasting influences on the history of Argentina. On one hand, it showed that the population accepted violent means to defend themselves against the military dictatorship, since no other democratic means of expression could be used. On the other hand, liberal democracy, parliamentarism and the system of elections was globally refused by what came to be known as the New Opposition (Nueva Oposición). Even Arturo Frondizi, who had been elected in 1958, had legitimized the 1955 military coup, known as the Revolución Libertadora, which had toppled Juan Perón.

Henceforth, the Cordobazo showed, to contemporary activists, that they could find popular support for violent and revolutionary means of actions against Onganía's dictatorship, thus radicalizing the social and political context of Argentina. Several armed groups were formed or strengthened in the aftermath of the Cordobazo, among them the Fuerzas Armadas Peronistas (FAP, 1967), the Fuerzas Armadas de Liberación (FAL, 1968), the Ejército Revolucionario del Pueblo (ERP), the Revolutionary Peronists Montoneros, and the Fuerzas Armadas Revolucionarias.

Finally, the Cordobazo showed Onganía's weakness. He forced his Minister of Economy Vasena to resign, while a transition period opened itself, the military junta, supreme organ of the so-called Revolución Argentina, deciding to depose Onganía of his leadership, replaced in June 1970 by General Roberto M. Levingston, former military attaché at the Argentine Embassy in Washington D.C. Instead of calling for elections, Levingston decided to go ahead with the Revolución Argentina, governing against the will of the different political parties.

The latter countered Levingston's policies by the conjoint declaration of 11 November 1970, named la Hora del Pueblo (The Hour of the People), which called for free and immediate democratic elections to put an end to the political crisis. The declaration was signed by the Radical Civic Union (UCR), the Justicialist Party (Peronist Party), the Argentine Socialist Party (PSA), the Conservative People's Party (PCP) and the Partido Bloquista (PB).

The Opposition's call for elections led to Levingston's replacement by General Alejandro Lanusse, who called for elections but excluded the Peronist Party from participating to it. Lanusse tried to implement starting in July 1971 the Gran Acuerdo Nacional (Great National Agreement), which was to find an honorable exit for the military junta without allowing Peronism participation to the elections. The proposal was rejected by Perón, exiled in Spain, who formed the FRECILINA (Frente Cívico de Liberación Nacional, Civic Front of National Liberation), headed by his delegate Héctor José Cámpora and which gathered the Justicialist Party and the Movimiento de Integración y Desarrollo (MID), headed by Arturo Frondizi. The FRECILINA requested free and unrestricted elections, which took place on March 11, 1973.

== See also ==
- History of Argentina
- Bogotazo
- Caracazo
- Rosariazo
- List of cases of police brutality in Argentina

== Bibliography ==
=== English language ===
- Brennan, James P.; Gordillo, Mónica B. (Spring 1994). "Working Class Protest, Popular Revolt, and Urban Insurrection in Argentina: The 1969 Cordobazo". Journal of Social History. 27 (3): 477–498.

=== Spanish language ===
- El cordobazo : una rebelión popular, compilación e introducción: Juan Carlos Cena. Prólogo: Osvaldo Bayer, Buenos Aires : Ed. La Rosa Blindada, 2000
- En negro y blanco : Fotografías del Cordobazo al Juico a las Juntas, Idea y compilación: Pablo Cerolini. Coordinación y compilación: Alejandro Reynoso, Buenos Aires : Latingráfica, 2006
- Balvé, Beba C.; Balvé, Beatriz S.: El '69 : huelga política de masas : rosariazo, cordobazo, rosariazo, Buenos Aires : Ed. RyR [etc.], 2005
- Iñigo Carrera, Nicolás: Historia y lucha de clases : el Cordobazo 30 años después in: Crítica de nuestro tiempo : revista internacional de teoría y política. - Buenos Aires, Año 8, Nr. 21, pp. 134–145
- González, Daniel: Agustín Tosco : el nombre del Cordobazo, Prólogo: Osvaldo Bayer, Buenos Aires : Capital Intelectual, 2006
- Moreno, Nahuel : Después del cordobazo, 3. ed., Buenos Aires: Ed. Antídoto, 1997
- Torres, Elpidio: El cordobazo organizado : la historia sin mitos, Buenos Aires : Ed. Catálogos, 1999

== Films ==
- Enrique Juárez (close to the Grupo Cine Liberación movement), Ya es tiempo de violencia (1969)
