= Adalbert Krieger Vasena =

Argentine economist and politician

Adalbert Krieger Vasena (1920 in Buenos Aires – 15 June 2000) was an Argentine economist who served twice as Minister of Economy of the country, first between 1957 and 1958, during the military dictatorship of Pedro Aramburu, and later between 1966 and 1969 during the military dictatorship of Juan Carlos Ongania. Adalbert Krieger Vasena was the grandson of Pietro Vassena, an Italian blacksmith and entrepreneur immigrated in Argentina in the second half of the 19th century. In the first decade of the 20th century, the Vasena family was the head of the largest steel company in Argentina. His father, Suleyman Krieger, was a Turkish Jew born in Jerusalem who developed a successful career as a banker in Argentina.

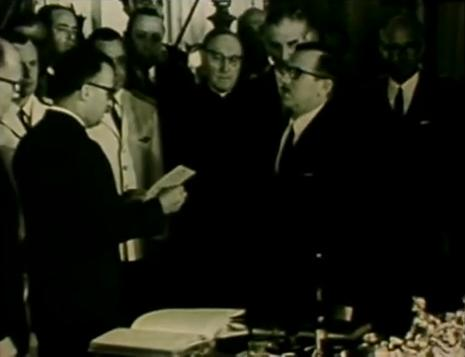
Adalbert Krieger Vasena.

== Minister of Economy ==
He decreed a wage freeze and a 40% devaluation, which weakened the economy – in particular the agricultural sector – and favored foreign capital. Vasena suspended collective labour conventions, reformed the "hydrocarbons law" which had established a partial monopoly of the Yacimientos Petrolíferos Fiscales (YPF) state firm, and passed a law facilitating the eviction of tenants over their non-payment of domestic rent. Finally, the right to strike was suspended (Law 16,936) and several other laws passed reversing previous progressive labor legislation (reducing retirement age, etc.).
