= Agustín Tosco =

Argentine union leader (1930–1975)

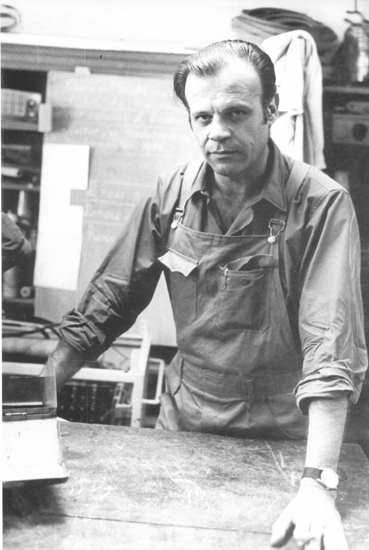
Argentine union leader Agustín Tosco, 1970.

Agustín Gringo Tosco (May 22, 1930 – November 5, 1975) was an Argentine union leader, member of the CGT de los Argentinos and an important participant in the historic local uprising known as the Cordobazo.

== Thought and maturity ==
Tosco was born in Coronel Moldes, Córdoba province, Argentina. At 27 years old, he was the general secretary for Luz y Fuerza (Light and Power utilities workers) in the province of Córdoba. Tosco felt that nothing could substitute for general assemblies, which he considered superior to representative committees, and that labor struggles should not simply focus on salary demands. His ideology can be described as anti-imperialist, anti-capitalist, and anti-bureaucratic.

He constantly fought against bureaucracy in the union. One of his most famous enemies in this regard was José Ignacio Rucci, another prominent leader in the CGT. About this, Tosco said the following, "Rucci and his disciples are prisoners of their commitment to the powerful, prisoners of the guardians who lend them the political apparatus, prisoners of a jail from which they can never escape: that of submission and indignity." Tosco and Rucci had many public confrontations.

In addition to the struggles particular to his own union, he participated in the fight against the dictatorship of Juan Carlos Onganía.

== His role in the Cordobazo ==
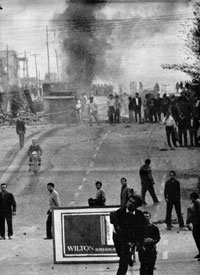
Cordobazo, 29 May 1969

On May 29, 1969, in the city of Córdoba, there was a popular uprising against the dictatorship of Onganía. Many workers and students confronted the military. After the Cordobazo, Tosco was condemned to eight years in prison by a military tribunal, but was free after 16 months. The Cordobazo was a milestone because is represented a loss of legitimacy for the Onganía government, and hastened its end. About the Cordobazo, Tosco said, "it was a rebellion for the workers and the people(...) it came out of the working class and the masses. The importance of the Cordobazo is that it came from the workers and the students and that for their convictions they came out into the streets to fight."

== After the Cordobazo ==
When he got out of prison, Tosco returned to Córdoba. With the victory of Peronism in 1973, Tosco began to be persecuted. In 1974, after the police coup against the governor Ricardo Obregón Cano, the Luz y Fuerza labor union was abolished, and Tosco was forced to go into hiding. A while later he fell ill, but could not go to the hospital for fear of execution.

Agustín Tosco died at 45 years of age, on November 5, 1975, and thousands of people attended his funeral, despite threats from the government of Isabel Perón and the Alianza Anticomunista Argentina (Argentine Anticomunist Alliance, a far right death squad). Participation in Tosco's funeral was violently suppressed by the government.
