= Trade unions in Argentina =

- National organization(s): CGT, CTA

International Labour Organization
- Argentina is a member of the ILO

Convention ratification
- Freedom of Association: 18 January 1960
- Right to Organise: 24 September 1956

Trade unions in Argentina have traditionally played a strong role in the politics of the nation. The largest trade union association, the Confederación General del Trabajo has been a force since the 1930s, and approximately 40% of workers in the formal economy are unionized.

== The FORA ==
The Argentine Regional Workers' Federation (FORA) was created in 1901. It split in 1915 between the FORA IX (of the Ninth Congress) and the FORA V (of the 5th Congress), the latter supporting an anarcho-syndicalist stance. In January 1919, the FORA notably called for demonstrations after police repression, during the Tragic Week, while it latter organized protests in Patagonia, which led to harsh repression by Hipólito Yrigoyen's administration (the disturbances were known as Patagonia rebelde).

Following the 1917 October Revolution in Russia and the founding of the Profintern, the Argentine Syndicates' Union (USA) was created in March 1922. Although more radical than FORA IX, the USA did not join the Profintern and remained independent from any international affiliation. Meanwhile, the FORA V was in steady decline, and was dissolved shortly before the installation of José Félix Uriburu's dictatorship, which opened up the years of the Infamous Decade.

== The Infamous Decade ==
At the time of the 1930 coup, three trade unions existed in Argentina: the Confederación Obrera Argentina (COA, founded in 1926 and linked to the Socialist Party, the Unión Sindical Argentina (USA, anarcho-syndicalist) and the FORA V, dissolved by Uriburu. On 20 September 1930, the COA and the USA merged in the General Confederation of Labour (CGT), although the two rival tendencies remained. The syndicalist current, however, became discredit, supporting alliance with the government in order to reach social advances, while the socialist current proposed open opposition tied to political support to the Socialist party. The syndicalist current was in particular affected by its agreements with the pro-fascist governor of Buenos Aires, Manuel Fresco.

Although the Great Depression and the subsequent rural exodus had brought many politically unexperimented workers to Buenos Aires, the spontaneous import substitution industrialization enabled, starting in 1935, coupled to the strengthening of trade unions, enabled wages' increase. Henceforth, a 48 hours general strike was launched in January 1936 by workers' in construction, during which 3 workers and 3 policemen were killed.

== Unions and Perón ==
As secretary of labor under the military regime that came to power in 1943, Colonel Juan Perón courted the unions and working class and by doing so established a power base that threatened the government. As a result, Perón was demoted and imprisoned, but the unions showed their strength in a multitudinous demonstration on October 17, 1945, that effectively propelled Perón towards the presidency.

As president, Perón consolidated both his power over the union movement (edging out and suppressing for instance unionists from anarchist tradition) and his power over the country by establishing a corporatist alliance with organized labor.

When in his turn Perón was overthrown and forced into exile (in 1955), the CGT leadership was purged, but even so the union movement remained the basis for semi-coordinated resistance to the series of governments that succeeded Peronism during the 1950s and 1960s. With the election of Augusto Vandor to the CGT leadership in 1962, unions became more conciliatory and integrated into the system. From exile, Perón fought against this tendency (which become known as Vandorism), attempting to keep open the possibility of his eventual return. He therefore began to encourage more radical tendencies within the Peronist movement.

Hence during the 1960s and early 1970s, Peronism was split between a wing associated with the union movement on the one hand, and on the other hand a more radical wing inspired by third worldism and Guevarism and led by the Peronist Youth (Juventud Peronista). Upon the General's return to Argentina, this split became violent, as symbolized above all by the massacre at Ezeiza the day of his arrival back in the country.

Over the course of the next few months, Perón sided with the unions rather than with the youth, whose armed groups were increasingly targeted by the regime that they themselves supported. After Perón's death and with the accession of his wife Isabel Perón to the presidency, this persecution only increased, and Argentine society headed towards open civil war in which a union-backed power directed in part by José López Rega faced increased militancy on the part of the Montoneros and others.

With the onset of the military regime that overthrew Isabel Perón in 1976, trade unions were themselves also violently suppressed. However, they again demonstrated their strength with general strikes and demonstrations during the lead-up to the restoration of civilian government in 1983.

== Unions today ==
Argentine workers' right to strike is protected by law, but unauthorized demonstrations have involved direct conflict with police in recent years.

Argentina's relatively inflexible labour market has been cited as a component of the country's high unemployment problem, and in the 1990s the government struggled to introduce labour laws which, among other things, would reduce the ability to bargain collectively above the enterprise level, and increase labour market flexibility. These changes were strongly opposed by the unions, including two general strikes in 1996. By 1998 measures agreed to by both sides had been passed, with industry-wide bargaining intact, and the removal of the temporary contract system which had allowed for workers with no social benefits.

Additional labour reforms were passed in 2004.

The union movement was weakened under the neoliberal conditions imposed first by the military junta and later reinforced by Carlos Menem and his minister of finance, Domingo Cavallo. Arguably, the protagonism of popular struggle has now passed to other movements, such as the unemployed piqueteros, who were much more prominent during the protests and crisis of 2001 and 2002.

Still, the heritage of Argentina's long history of labor organization remains important to this day.

== Bibliography ==
- James, Daniel (1994). Resistance and Integration. Peronism and the Argentine Working Class, 1946–1976. Cambridge UK: Cambridge University Press. pp. 320p. ISBN 978-0-521-46682-0.
- James McGuire, Peronism without Perón: Unions, Parties, and Democracy in Argentina. Stanford: Stanford University Press, 1997.
