= Augusto Vandor =

Argentine trade unionist leader, naval non-commissioned officer and politician

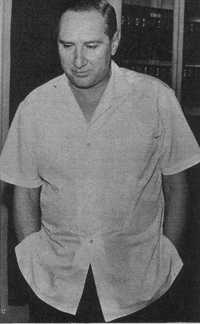
Augusto Vandor in February 1968.

Augusto Timoteo Vandor (1923–1969) was an Argentine trade unionist leader, naval non-commissioned officer and politician who was assassinated.

== Career ==
Vandor was born in Bovril, Entre Ríos Province, to a Dutch father and a French mother, in 1923. He enlisted in the Argentine Navy in 1941, and later became a non-commissioned officer aboard the minesweeper ARA Comodoro Py. He left the Navy in 1947, however, and joined the new Philips factory in the Saavedra neighborhood of Buenos Aires. There, he met his future wife, and gained a reputation for strategic thinking that earned him the nickname of El Lobo (the Wolf). He became the steward of the Phillips factory UOM local and in 1954, led a strike for better pay at the facility. Its success made him prominent in the UOM (the steelworkers' union within the CGT, the paramount trade union in Argentina), but led to his arrest following a 1955 military coup that overthrew the populist administration of Juan Perón.

Introduced to the exiled Perón in Santo Domingo in 1958, Vandor cultivated good relations with amenable figures in management and the military, and on the lifting of government receivership over the CGT in 1961, Vandor was elected Secretary General of the UOM, the largest of the CGT's 62 unions. He represented labor as part of the troika of Perón's official delegates in Argentina, and as such helped negotiate potential endorsements ahead of the 1963 elections. As the leading CGT political strategist, he was at least as influential in the Peronist movement as CGT Secretary General José Alonso, and helped plan "Operation Return", a 1964 mission to slip Perón into Argentina.

The mission's failure, and Alonso's support for a military coup against President Arturo Illia made opponents of Alonso and Vandor, and the two labor leaders backed opposing candidates in a Mendoza Province gubernatorial race in the 1965 elections. Vandor became increasingly critical of Perón, in part from a conviction that the aging leader might never return to Argentina. His vocal challenge to Perón's influence reached a high pitch during the Mendoza campaign, with slogans such as "For a Peronism without Perón," and "to save Perón, one has to be against Perón," and led the exiled leader to send his wife, Isabel, to promote Alonso's candidate. This resulted in the defeat of both Peronist candidates, however, and a conservative candidate was ultimately elected.

Vandor had the CGT leader ousted in February 1966, after which Alonso formed the "62 Organizations Standing with Perón" faction of the CGT. The military dictatorship installed that June and headed by General Juan Carlos Onganía lost Alonso's support by the end of 1966, and the two leaders found common cause in both their support for a "participationist" point of view (in favor of negotiations with the regime rather than for headfront opposition), and in their opposition to the more confrontational Raimundo Ongaro. These developments came to a head in March 1968, when Ongaro, head of the Graphists' Union, and Vandor both sought the post of CGT Secretary General. Perón, wary of Vandor, supported the graphist leader, and Ongaro was elected to the post. The CGT elections were annulled by Labor Minister Rubens San Sebastián, however, leading to a temporary schism within the CGT. Vandor thereafter reconciled himself with Perón, who favored a moderately critical stance towards the junta, opting for the participationist stance.

== Assassination ==
Augusto Vandor was shot five times on 30 June 1969, at his UOM offices, in what was codenamed Operation Judas. The perpetrators left a bomb, which upon exploding, destroyed part of the building. A far-left Peronist group, the Ejército Nacional Revolucionario claimed responsibility for the attack in February 1971. On the other hand, various authors point to figures and groups such as Dardo Cabo and the CGT de los Argentinos as responsible for the murder.
