= Juan Carlos Onganía =

35th President of Argentina

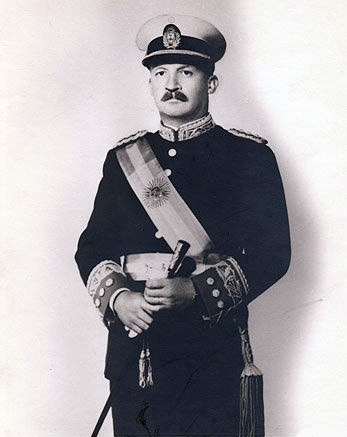

35th President of Argentina
- De facto
- In office 29 June 1966 – 8 June 1970
- Appointed by: Military junta
- Vice President: None
- Preceded by: Arturo Umberto Illia
- Succeeded by: Roberto Marcelo Levingston (de facto)

Personal details
- Born: Juan Carlos Onganía Carballo; 17 March 1914 Marcos Paz, Buenos Aires, Argentina
- Died: 8 June 1995 (aged 81) Buenos Aires, Argentina
- Party: Independent
- Spouse: María Emilia Green
- Profession: Military
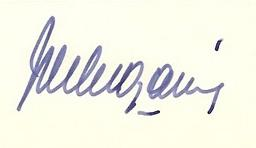
- Signature

Military service
- Allegiance: Argentina
- Branch/service: Argentine Army
- Years of service: 1934–1970
- Rank: (Pre-1991 epaulette) Lieutenant General

Juan Carlos Onganía Carballo (Spanish: [ˈxwaŋ ˈkaɾlos oŋɡaˈni.a]; 17 March 1914 – 8 June 1995) was President of Argentina from 29 June 1966 to 8 June 1970. He rose to power as dictator after overthrowing President Arturo Illia in a coup d'état self-named the "Argentine Revolution".

Onganía wanted to install in Argentina a paternalistic dictatorship modeled on Francoist Spain. While preceding military coups in Argentina were aimed at establishing temporary, transitional juntas, the Revolución Argentina headed by Onganía aimed at establishing a new political and social order, opposed both to liberal democracy and to communism, which gave the Armed Forces of Argentina a leading role in the political and economic operation of the country. Onganía implemented a rigid censorship that reached the press and all cultural manifestations such as cinema, theater and even poetry.

When the Armed Forces replaced the radical president in government with Onganía, they interrupted an attempt to set up the republic and led the country to the violence of the 1970s and subsequent decline.

== Family ==
Juan Carlos Onganía Carballo was born on 17 March 1914 in Marcos Paz, in the province of Buenos Aires, to Carlos Luis Onganía and Sara Rosa Carballo Sosa. Onganía is of Italian ancestry (Lecco and Como). His mother was of distant Portuguese ancestry.

== Presidency ==
=== Economic and social policies ===
While preceding military coups in Argentina were aimed at establishing temporary, transitional juntas, the Revolución Argentina headed by Onganía aimed at establishing a new political and social order, opposed both to liberal democracy and to communism, which gave the Armed Forces of Argentina a leading role in the political and economic operation of the country. The political scientist Guillermo O'Donnell named this type of regime "authoritarian-bureaucratic state", in reference both to the Revolución Argentina, the Brazilian military regime (1964–1985), Augusto Pinochet's regime in Chile (1973–1990), and Juan María Bordaberry's regime in Uruguay (1973–1976).

While Chief of the Army in 1963, Onganía helped crush the 1963 Argentine Navy Revolt by mobilizing troops that seized rebelling naval bases. However, he demonstrated a disregard for civil authority when he initially refused to call off his troops after a ceasefire agreement had been approved by President José María Guido and his cabinet, and was only convinced to follow orders after a tense meeting.

As military dictator, Onganía suspended political parties and supported a policy of Participacionismo ("Participationism", supported by the trade unionist José Alonso and then by the general secretary of the CGT-Azopardo, Augusto Vandor), by which representatives of various interest groups such as industry, labor, and agriculture would form committees to advise the government. However, these committees were largely appointed by the dictator himself. Onganía also suspended the right to strike (Law 16,936) and supported a corporatist economic and social policy, enforced particularly in Cordoba by the appointed governor, Carlos Caballero.

Onganía's Minister of Economy, Adalbert Krieger Vasena, decreed a wage freeze (amid 30% inflation) and a 40% devaluation, which adversely impacted the state of the Argentine economy (agriculture in particular), favoring foreign capital. Krieger Vasena suspended collective labour conventions, reformed the Fossil Fuels Law which had established a partial monopoly of the Yacimientos Petrolíferos Fiscales (YPF) state enterprise, and also signed a law facilitating the expulsion of tenants in cases of non-payment of rent.

=== Cultural and education policy ===
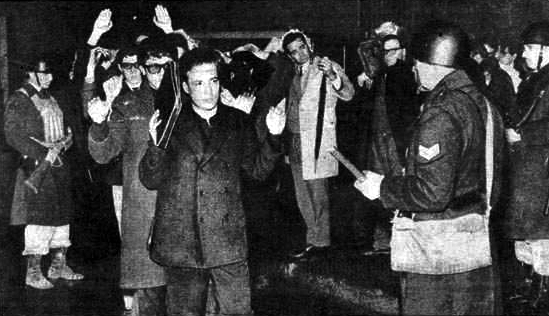
La Noche de los Bastones Largos ("The Night of the Long Police Batons"), as Onganía's 1966 police action against University of Buenos Aires students and faculty came to be known

Onganía's rule signified an end to university autonomy, which had been achieved by the University Reform of 1918. Barely a month into his administration, he was responsible for the violation of university autonomy in the so-called La Noche de los Bastones Largos ("The Night of the Long Police Batons") in which he ordered police to invade the Faculty of Sciences of the University of Buenos Aires. Students and professors were beaten and arrested. Many were later forced to leave the country, beginning a "brain drain" that adversely affects Argentine academia to this day.

Onganía also ordered repression on all forms of "immoralism", proscribing miniskirts, long hair for boys, public kissing, and all avant-garde artistic movements. "Obscene" books including Lolita and Nexus were censored, as were some films including Loves of a Blonde and Blow-Up. Nightclubs were forbidden from having dim lighting. This moral campaign favored the radicalization of the middle classes, who were very overrepresented in universities.

In 1969, Onganía dedicated the country to the Immaculate Heart of Mary.

=== Protests ===
Eventually, this position was opposed by other factions in the military, which felt that its influence in government would be diminished. At the end of May 1968, General Julio Alsogaray dissented from Onganía, and rumors spread about a possible coup d'état, with Alsogaray leading the conservative opposition to Onganía. Finally, at the end of the month, Onganía dismissed the leaders of the Armed Forces: Alejandro Agustín Lanusse replaced Alsogaray, Pedro Gnavi replaced Benigno Varela, and Jorge Martínez Zuviría replaced Adolfo Alvarez. Onganía's government was weakened by a popular uprising of workers and students that took place in various places across the country, in particular in the interior in cities such as Córdoba in 1969 (known as "El Cordobazo") and Rosario (known as the "Rosariazo"). Another factor that led to Onganía's downfall was the assassination of Pedro Eugenio Aramburu in June 1970.

The dominant military faction, led by General Lanusse, demanded that Onganía resign. When he refused, he was toppled by a military junta.

== Later life ==
After his departure from office Onganía retired definitively to a Buenos Aires estate. He was critical of the human rights violations during the National Reorganization Process, the name given to the military dictatorship of Jorge Videla and other officers between 1976 and 1983.

In 1989, the Constitutional Nationalist Party proposed nominating him as a candidate, but he did not reach an agreement with them and remained away from politics. For the 1995 elections he was a candidate for president for the Front for Patriotic Solidarity after criticizing President Carlos Menem for the widespread corruption in Menem's government.

== Death ==
In May 1995, Onganía suffered a stroke which left him paralyzed and unable to speak. As a result, he was forced to withdraw his presidential candidacy, although his name continued to appear on the ballot. He died of a heart attack at the Military Hospital of Buenos Aires at the age of 81 on 8 June 1995.

Political offices
Preceded by Arturo Umberto Illia	President of Argentina; 1966–1970	Succeeded by Roberto M. Levingston
