= Sadosky =

Sadosky is a surname. Notable people with the surname include:

- Cora Ratto de Sadosky (1912–1981), Argentine mathematician, educator and militant activist
- Cora Sadosky (1940–2010), Argentine mathematician
- Manuel Sadosky (1914–2005), Argentine mathematician

== See also ==
- Sadosky Prize, mathematics prize
