= Sara Rietti =

Argentine nuclear chemist

- Born: Sara Bartfeld; 3 December 1930; Buenos Aires, Argentina
- Died: 28 May 2017 (aged 86); Buenos Aires, Argentina
- Education: University of Buenos Aires
- Occupation: Nuclear chemist
- Known for: First nuclear chemist from Argentina
- Spouse: Víctor Rietti
- Children: Three

Sara Rietti (Buenos Aires, 3 December 1930 – Buenos Aires, 28 May 2017), also known as Sara Bartfeld de Rietti, was the first nuclear chemist from Argentina. She was Chief of Staff of the Ministry of Science and Technology during the government of President Raúl Alfonsín.

== Life and work ==
=== Education ===
Rietti began studying chemistry in 1948 after she had finished her secondary education, graduating in 1954 with her degree in nuclear chemistry. She took her last course at the National Atomic Energy Commission in 1953, a fact that by chance allowed her to be the first nuclear chemist in Argentina. Her thesis was titled Study of the reaction between diboron tetrachloride and diborane. Boranes are chemical compounds known as boron hydrides. These materials cannot receive air or humidity. Because they have to always remain cold, she had to constantly monitor her compounds, including on weekends when she went to her laboratory with her children. In 1963, she finally obtained her doctorate from UBA.

=== Research career ===
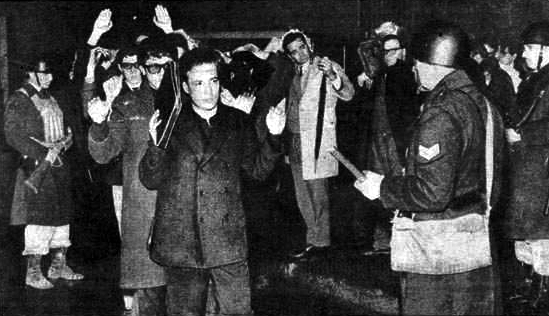
Night of the Long Canes, 29 July 1966

Rietti worked as a researcher at various Argentine universities and state agencies including the Department of Inorganic Chemistry and Physicochemistry at the University of Buenos Aires between 1955 and 1956. She was also a member of the board of directors of the Faculty of Exact and Natural Sciences of the University of Buenos Aires (UBA), where she witnessed the country's security forces breaking into the university during the events known as the Night of the Long Canes on 29 July 1966.

On that night, after police detained about 400 intellectuals, Sara and her husband Víctor moved from one police station to the next to free their colleagues from jail. As a result of the nationwide repression, numerous laboratories and libraries were destroyed and many scientists and academics were exiled or fled the country. Sara and Victor decided to remain in Argentina.

Rietti worked at the Latin American Publishing Center as director of the Scientific Collection between 1967 and 1969 and served on the board of that publisher between 1972 and 1992. Between 1973 and 1975, she was the coordination director of the National Institute of Industrial Technology.

In 1983, when science was again allowed to flourish in Argentina, the mathematician Manuel Sadosky appointed her Chief of Staff of the Secretary of Science and Technology, over which he presided, and in 1994 she was appointed academic coordinator of the Graduate Policy and Management of Science and Technology at the UBA. She was also a teacher advisor to the Rectorate there, a position she held until the end of her life.

== Family life ==
Her mother was of Polish descent and her father was Ukrainian. He encouraged her in the sciences when he noticed her abilities in mathematics. Although she preferred philosophy, history or political science, she ultimately followed her father's advice because she had a cousin who had already graduated as a chemist.

While studying at the university, she met Víctor Rietti but was reluctant to establish a personal relationship with him because he was too young and they only saw each other at the university. At his insistence, they got married in 1952, had three children and sixty years later they were still together.

== Honors ==
- The main room for gender studies at the National University of Cuyo was named after Rietti in October 2010, to pay tribute to Argentine women scientists.
- On 4 November 2011, the National University of Rosario awarded her an honorary doctorate.
- In 2022, Rietti was one of eleven women scientists honored in the renamed Hall of Argentine Science, which is located in the Government House, first floor.
