= Escuela Superior Latinoamericana de Informática =

Computer science school in Argentina, 1986–1990

Coordinates: 34°50′58″S 58°08′07″W

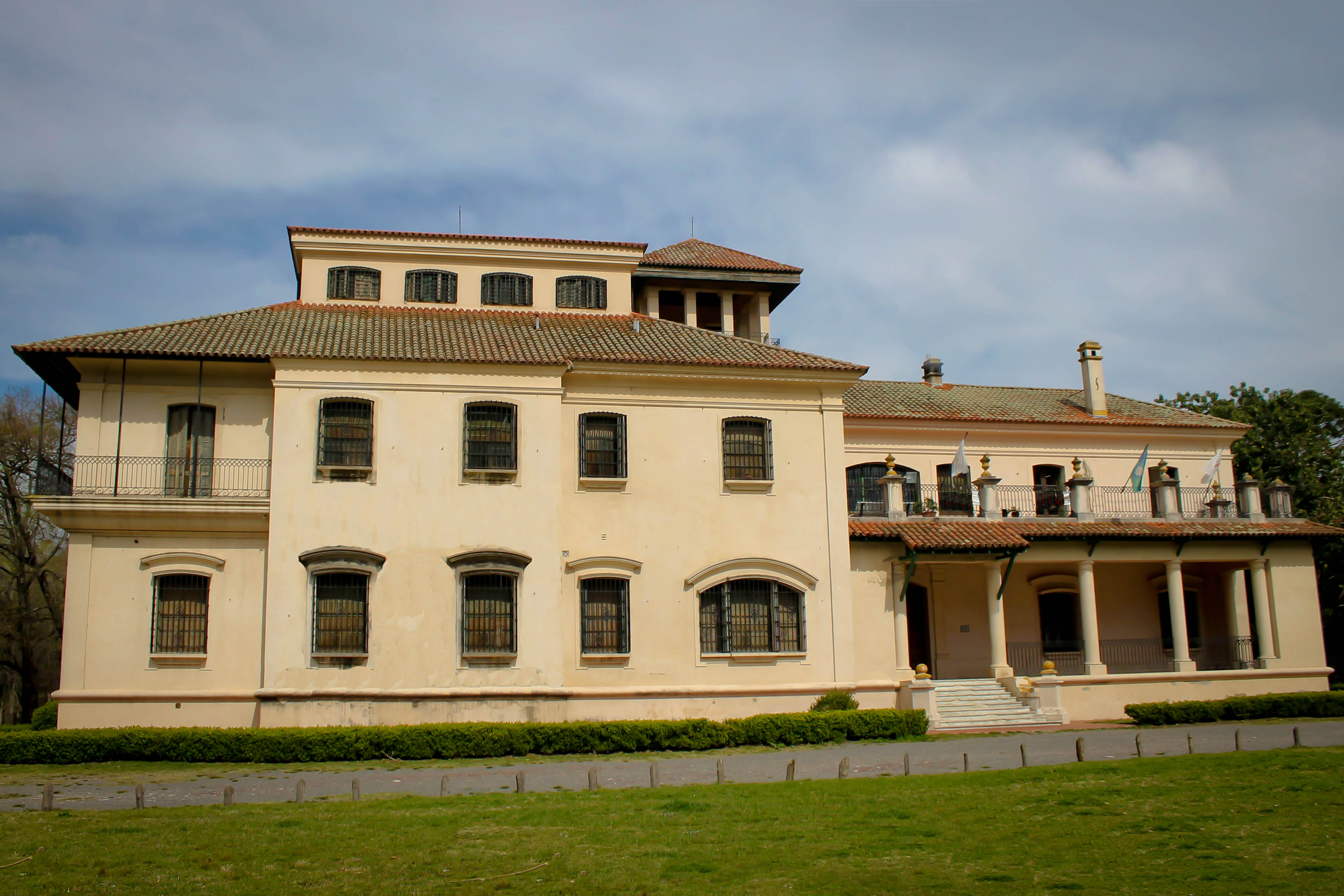

ESLAI or Escuela Superior Latinoamericana de Informática (Spanish: Latin American School of Advanced Studies in Computer Science) was a small Argentinean computer science school established in 1986 and dissolved in 1990. In its short life, ESLAI had a considerable impact on computer science teaching and research in Argentina and other South American countries.

Argentine mathematician Manuel Sadosky was the key sponsor of the creation of ESLAI; other founders include Rebeca Guber, and Armando Haeberer, who also served as Deputy Director; Jorge Vidart was named Director soon after ESLAI opened. ESLAI relied heavily on cooperation agreements with and funding from a number of foreign universities, and governments and international organizations for equipment, operations, and visiting faculty. ESLAI premises were located in the main house of Pereyra Iraola Park, a former country estate located between Buenos Aires (40 km) and La Plata (20 km) in Argentina.

Each year around 35 students (about 15% of applicants) from across Latin America were admitted, all with full financial support. Classes were taught in Spanish or English by well-regarded local and visiting faculty, and graduates earned a Licenciado degree, which in Argentina takes five years of coursework and a final thesis. Many of ESLAI's graduates would go on to earn postgraduate degrees in Europe and the Americas.

ESLAI's core curriculum followed ACM guidelines, using English-language textbooks and technical articles, and included a heavy load of programming assignments, building strong software development competencies. Theoretical computer science topics dominated advanced seminars and graduation theses, as most of the faculty were affiliated with European universities.

Unfortunately, while ESLAI was an academic success, it was unable to develop enduring support across the spectrum of political parties, the public higher education establishment, and the private sector. Lacking continuing financial or political support, ESLAI had to close down in September 1990 during the presidency of Carlos Menem.
