= Eliseo Verón =

Argentine scientist (1935–2014)

- Born: June 12, 1935; Buenos Aires, Argentina
- Died: April 15, 2014 (aged 78); Buenos Aires, Argentina
- Education: Universidad de Buenos Aires
- Awards: Guggenheim Fellowship (1970)
- Scientific career
- Fields: Semiotics; Sociology; Anthropology
- Workplaces: Universidad de San Andrés

Eliseo Verón (June 12, 1935 – April 15, 2014) was an Argentine sociologist, anthropologist and semiotician, and professor of communication sciences at Universidad de San Andrés. His work is known mainly in Spanish and French-speaking countries.

== Academic career ==
He was born in Buenos Aires, where he studied at the university, and began teaching philosophy and sociology as a student from 1957. In 1960, he received a degree in philosophy at the University of Buenos Aires. After graduation, he obtained a scholarship from CONICET to study Social Anthropology Laboratory at the Collège de France with Claude Lévi-Strauss. Verón was in charge of the first translation into spanish of Structural Anthropology, an anthology of Lévi-Strauss's work on that subject, published by Editorial Universitaria de Buenos Aires (Eudeba) in 1961. He recognizes Lévi-Strauss as his main influence during this period. In 1962 he attended a seminar by Roland Barthes at the Ecole Pratique des Hautes Etudes, where he discovered Saussurian semiotics, which became a point of departure for him in future work.

Upon returning to Argentina, Verón became a professor in the Department of Sociology at the University of Buenos Aires. In 1967 and 1968, he directed the Center for Social Research at the Torcuato di Tella Institute. He was professor of Social Psychology at the Universidad Nacional del Litoral and Professor of Sociology at the University of Salvador. In 1970, he won the Guggenheim Fellowship. During the 1970s, he settled in France, where he lived until 1995. He taught at several universities in France (Paris, Bordeaux, Bayonne) and in 1985 received his degree of Doctor of State at the University of Paris VIII. He was professor at the Sorbonne between 1987 and 1992.

In 1995 he returned to Argentina and directed the graduate program in communication sciences at the Universidad Hebrea Argentina Bar Illán. He also taught communication sciences this same discipline taught at the Universidad Nacional de Rosario, the Universidad Nacional del Sur, the University of Fribourg and the University of San Andrés. Between 2000 and 2006, he directed the Master of Journalism program at the University of San Andrés, a joint project with the Clarín Group and Columbia University.

Verón has published books on sociology, social psychology, communication and semiotics since 1968. His early period was influenced by the structuralism of Claude Lévi-Strauss and the binary theory of the sign of Ferdinand de Saussure, and then the triadic sign theory of Charles Sanders Peirce, on whom he relied to develop his theory of social semiosis in 1988.

In 1974 he founded the journal LENGUAjes in Buenos Aires, along with Oscar Steinberg, Juan Carlos Indart, and Oscar Traversa. The publication of this journal was the effective introduction of semiotics in Argentina.

Between 1970 and 1978, Verón was president of the Argentine Association of Semiotics.

== Political activity ==
In December 2010, Verón made a speech contributing to the launch of Eduardo Duhalde, who ran for president of Argentina in 2011.

== Death ==
Verón died of cancer on April 15, 2014, at his home in Buenos Aires.

== Works ==
1. Conducta, estructura y comunicación (1968)
2. Imperialismo, lucha de clases y conocimiento: 25 años de sociología en la Argentina (1974)
3. A produçao de sentido (São Paulo, 1980)
4. Construire l'événement (1981)
5. Construir el acontecimiento (Eng: Building the event) (1983). Castellano edition of Construire l'événement, translated by Horacio Verbitsky.
6. Perón o muerte: los fundamentos discursivos del fenómeno peronista (1986). Peron or death: the discursive foundations of the Peronist phenomenon (1986). En colaboración con Silvia Sigal. In collaboration with Silvia Sigal.
7. La semiosis social. The social semiosis. Fragmentos de una teoría de la discursividad (1988) Fragments of a theory of discursivity (1988)
8. Espaces du livre (1989) Espaces du livre (1989)
9. Semiosis de lo ideológico y del poder (1995) Semiosis of the ideological and power (1995)
10. Esto no es un libro (1999) This is not a book (1999)
11. Effectos de agenda (1999) Calendar effects (1999)
12. El cuerpo de las imágenes (2001) The body of images (2001)
13. Espacios mentales. Mental spaces. Effectos de agenda 2 (2002) Effects of schedule 2 (2002)
14. Fragmentos de un tejido (2004) Fragments of tissue (2004)

== Awards ==
1. In 1970 he was named a Guggenheim Fellow by the Guggenheim Foundation.
2. In 2006 he received the Konex Award for his contribution to linguistic and literary theory.
3. In 2006 he was named Doctor Honoris Causa by the Universidad Nacional de Rosario.
