= Canzani =

Canzani is a Spanish-language surname. Notable people with this surname include:

- Carlos Canzani, 1980s Uruguayan rock musician
- Joseph Canzani (1915–2008), American art teacher, president of Columbus College of Art and Design
- Pájaro Canzani, Uruguayan rock musician, former member of Chilean band Los Jaivas
- Pia Nancy Canzani, competitor for Maryland in Miss World USA 1972 & Miss Maryland World 1972
- Yaiza Canzani, Spanish and Uruguayan mathematician
