= Rachel Chan =

Rachel Chan may refer to:

- Rachel Chan (badminton)
- Rachel Chan (biologist)
