= Faculty of Medical Sciences, National University of Rosario =

Medical school in Rosario, Argentina

Coordinates: 32°56′24″S 60°39′54″W

Faculty of Medical Sciences
- Facultad de Ciencias Médicas
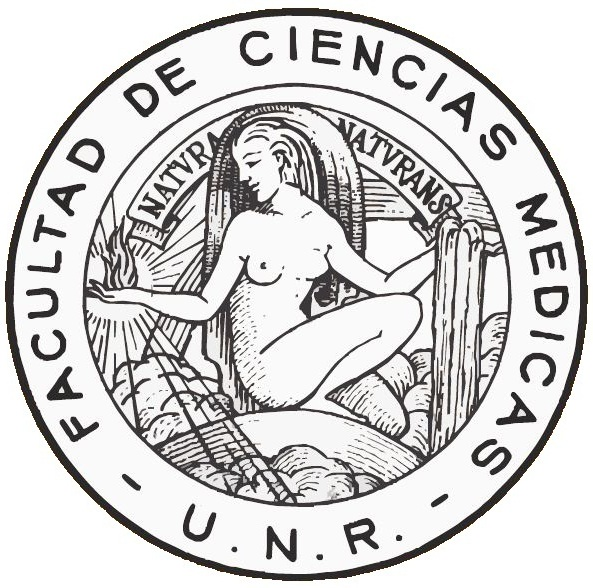
- Motto: Natura Naturans
- Type: Public
- Established: April 9, 1920
- Rector: Prof. Dr. Carlos D. Crisci
- Students: 14.157
- Location: Santa Fe Avenue 3100, Rosario, Santa Fe, Argentina
- Website: Official website

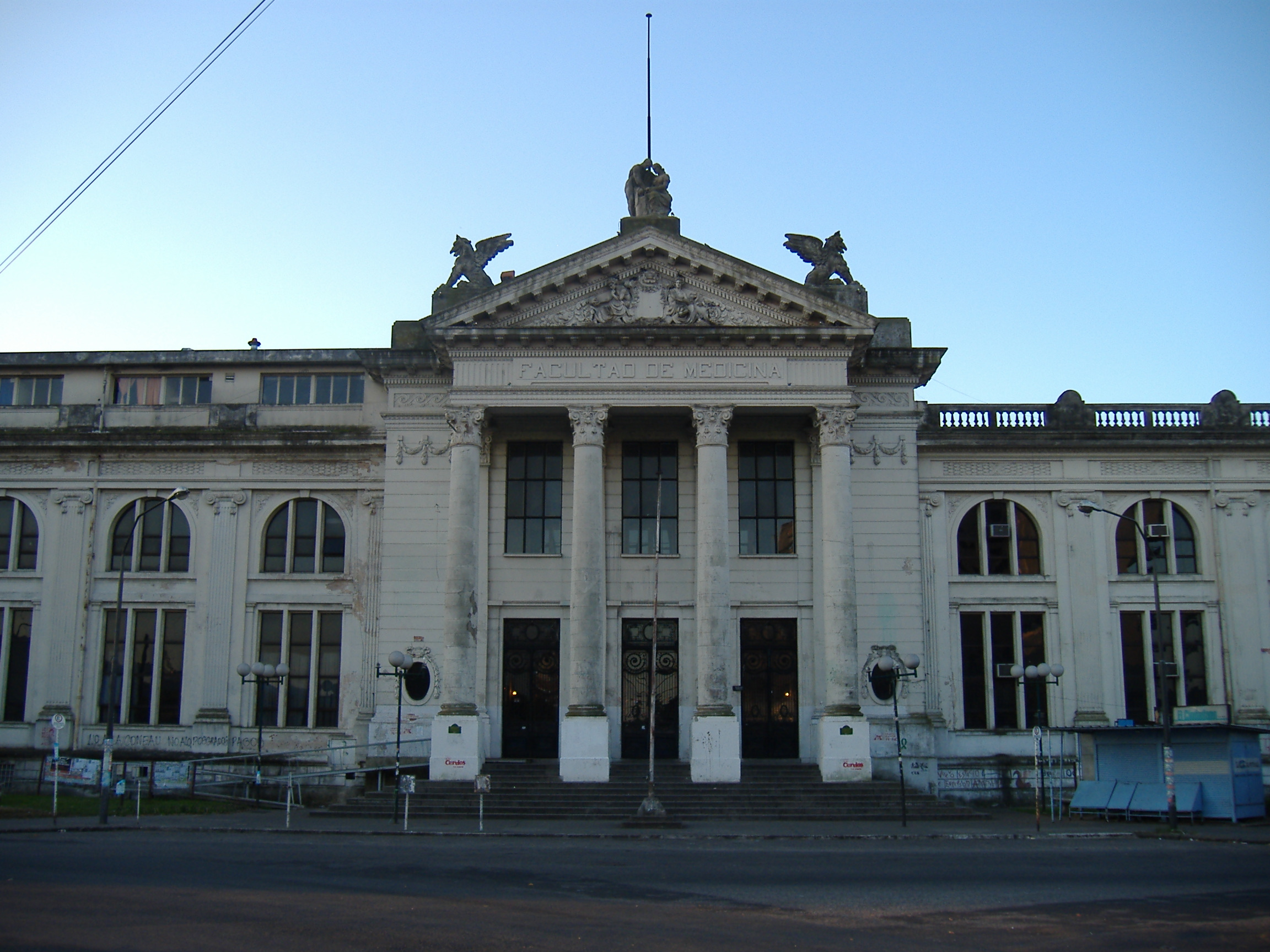
Faculty of Medical Sciences

The Faculty of Medical Sciences, National University of Rosario (Facultad de Ciencias Médicas in Spanish) is the medical school in Rosario, Argentina.

== History ==
To celebrate the centenary of the May Revolution on April 18, 1910, Argentine politician Cornelio Casablanca proposed the construction of the Centennial Hospital and School of Medical Education in the city of Rosario. Construction began on May 24 1910 with the laying the foundation stone on France Avenue.

Construction was completed on October 17 1919 and given the name National University of the Littoral, whose officer maintained authority over the entire facility until 1968.

On April 9 1920, hospital Vice Chairman Casiano Casas transferred the facilities to the national government which registered it on April 13 1920. On May 29 Casas performed a symbolic act of opening the site and on June 1 1920 Professor of Embryology and Histology Dr. Thomas Cerruti held the first class.

The National University of the Littoral became the National University of Rosario in 1968.

This was followed by the creation of the Faculty of Medical Sciences.

On May 16, 1969, protests known as "Rosariazo" against repressive acts began in the Corrientes Province against the dictatorship of Juan Carlos Onganía.
