= Ana María Cué =

Argentine pianist, poet, and educator

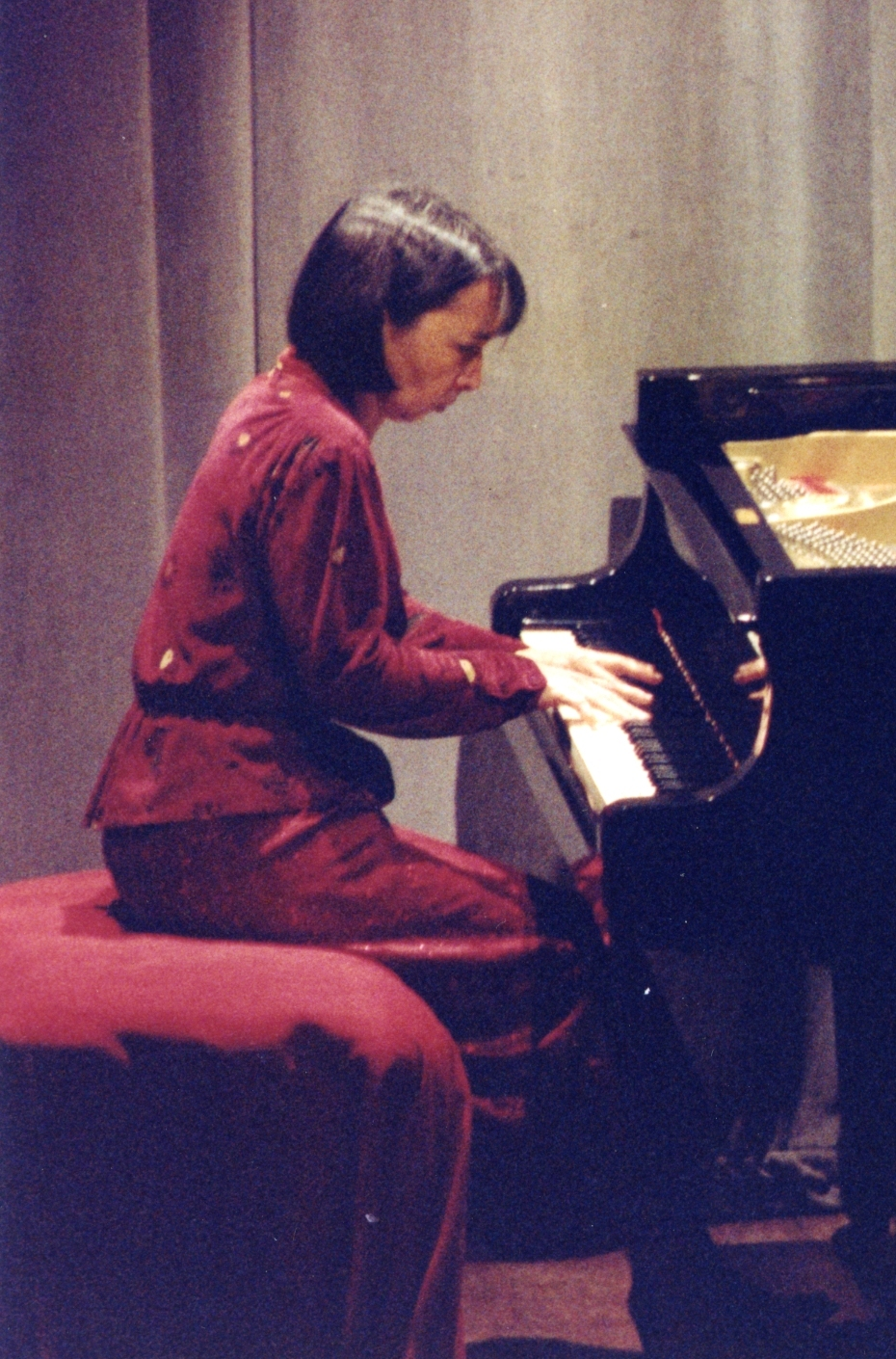
- Born: 19 February 1941 (age 85); Rosario, Argentina
- Education: National University of Rosario; DePauw University
- Occupations: Pianist, poet, educator

Ana María Cué (born 19 February 1941) is an Argentinian pianist, poet, and educator. She is known for her work in Argentina, Brazil, Canada, and the United States.

== Biography ==
Ana María Cué was born in Rosario, Santa Fe, Argentina on 19 February 1941. She studied at the School of Music of the National University of Rosario (UNR) with professors such as Antonio de Raco, Arminda Canteros, Simón Blech, and Luis A. Machado, graduating as a senior music teacher. She received a scholarship to DePauw University in Indiana, and in 1970, she obtained her master's degree in music. She also worked there as a piano teacher.

During much of the 1970s – under the auspices of the Argentine embassy in Quebec, the Argentine Ministry of Foreign Affairs, and L'Union des Latins d'Amérique – she developed her career as a performing artist. She made several concert tours, and taught in the United States and in Canada. Within a cultural program aimed at disseminating the works of Latin American composers, she performed in the Canadian cities of Montreal, Ottawa, and Toronto. The Ottawa Journal observed that she "demonstrated her wide range of tonal values, her splendid technique as well as her capacity to interpret the spiritual and mystic depths of this great work." She also offered recitals at various universities – including those in Arizona, California, Massachusetts, and Michigan – and at the OAS Hall of the Americas and the Peabody Center Hall, both in Washington, culminating at Carnegie Hall in New York. This last performance was broadcast by the radio station Voice of America, and in his review, the New York Times music critic Joseph Horowitz wrote that Cué was "a superb technician and a fiery yet thoughtful interpreter" with a "splendid ear for color", who "uses the pedal far more imaginatively than most young players."

She was also active in Latin America. She performed as a soloist at the San Pedro Theater in Porto Alegre, Brazil, at the auditorium of the Federal University of Rio Grande do Sul, and with Argentine orchestras such as the National Symphony Orchestra, the Buenos Aires Philharmonic, and the provincial symphony orchestras of Santa Fe and Rosario, under the baton of Juan Carlos Zorzi, Washington Castro, Jorge Rotter, Guillermo Scarabino, and Cristián Hernández Larguía. She performed chamber music in duets with the cellist Pedro Farrugiaand and with other groups. In 2001, she participated in the first Martha Argerich Festival, held in Rosario.

Ana María Cué is a tenured professor by competition of the piano chair at the UNR School of Music, and is a member of the faculty of the Instituto Promúsica de Rosario.

In 1972, she released a recording of Concertino para piano y 14 instrumentos by Santa Fe composer Virtú Maragno. For this, she received the Diploma of Honor – in the category Argentine Music – from the Buenos Aires Musical Foundation. In 1972 and 1973, under the direction of Professor Sara Reitich, she created a monograph entitled Obtención de material didáctico latinoamericano para la enseñanza de piano (Obtaining Latin American Didactic Material for the Teaching of Piano).

In 2000, as a member of UNR's Group for the Study and Diffusion of Argentine Music, she was invited to participate in the International Congress of Musical Didactics held in Bologna, Italy.

== Poetry ==
In addition to her work as a pianist, Cué has published several volumes of poetry.

- 1970: Poemas monótonos, Rosario: Gráfico Sudilovsky, 55 pages
- 1974: Poemas, Rosario: Mantrana 7000
- 1978: Muestra poética, shared work with other poets
- 1978: Dos y dos, Rosario: Laberinto
- 1989: Cara y cruz, Rosario: El Lagrimal Trifurca
- 2009: Visiones fugitivas, Rosario: Palabras de Bulevar

In 2010, she gave a performance combining piano music, poetry, and singing.

It is a music and poetry recital that I call Rehearsal of Life because I bring together works from my repertoire (Scriabin, Liszt, and Brahms) with my poetry and songs – because I have put some poems to music – and I will sing them. This is a novelty. It is a new recital; it is everything I have done: my two parallel activities as one in this Rehearsal of Life. [...] I think that one is always rehearsing life; you could say that it is a rehearsal of the rehearsal of life. And it's also new and I'll be rehearsing myself.

== Awards and distinctions ==
- 1972: First prize in the national "New Poet 1972" competition organized by the Dr. Isidoro Steinberg Foundation, Buenos Aires
- 1975: Silver Pen award from the Nucleation of Argentine Writers, poetry section, of the city of Santa Fe
- 2018: Declared a Distinguished Artist by the city of Rosario

== Discography ==
- Panorama de la música argentina, UNR Group for Study and Diffusion of Argentine Music, Schnitt - Mediatone Studio, Switzerland
- Concertino para piano y 14 instrumentos by Virtú Maragno; Ana María Cué (piano), Rosario: National University of the Littoral, 1972
- Música en la Universidad. Música académica latinoamericana; intérpretes varios. Rosario: National University of the Littoral, 2010
