= Cecilia Berdichevsky =

Argentine computer scientist (1925–2010)

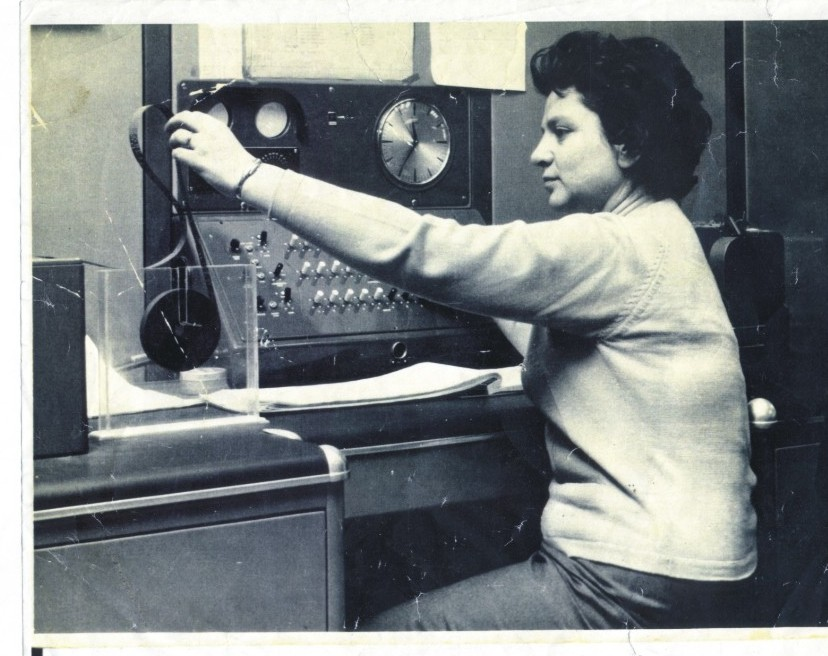
- Berdichevsky with the Mercury computer, named Clementina
- Born: Mirjam Tuwjasz; 30 March 1925; Vidzy, Poland
- Died: 28 February 2010 (aged 84); Avellaneda, Argentina
- Other name: Cecilia Tuwjasz
- Occupation: computer scientist
- Known for: Work on Ferranti Mercury
- Spouse: Mario Berdichevsky

Cecilia Berdichevsky or Berdichevski (née Tuwjasz; 30 March 1925 – 20 February 2010) was an Argentine computer scientist. She began her work in 1961 using the first Ferranti Mercury computer in that country.

== Biography ==
She was born Mirjam Tuwjasz on 30 March 1925 to a Polish-Jewish family in Vidzy, at that time part of Poland, now Belarus.

Because of growing hostilities toward the Jewish community, first her father and then her mother Hoda and her emigrated to Argentina when she was four years old, where she adopted the name Cecilia, and she spent her childhood years in Avellaneda, south of the Buenos Aires suburbs. Her father died within a few years of arriving in their new home and her mother remarried a rich man.

Cecilia married Mario Berdichevsky, a physician from Avellaneda, in 1951.

Despite having a good job as a practicing accountant for ten years, she was not happy there having experienced many frustrations. A friend, computer scientist Rebeca Guber, advised her to study mathematics at the University of Buenos Aires, which changed her life.

=== Clementina ===
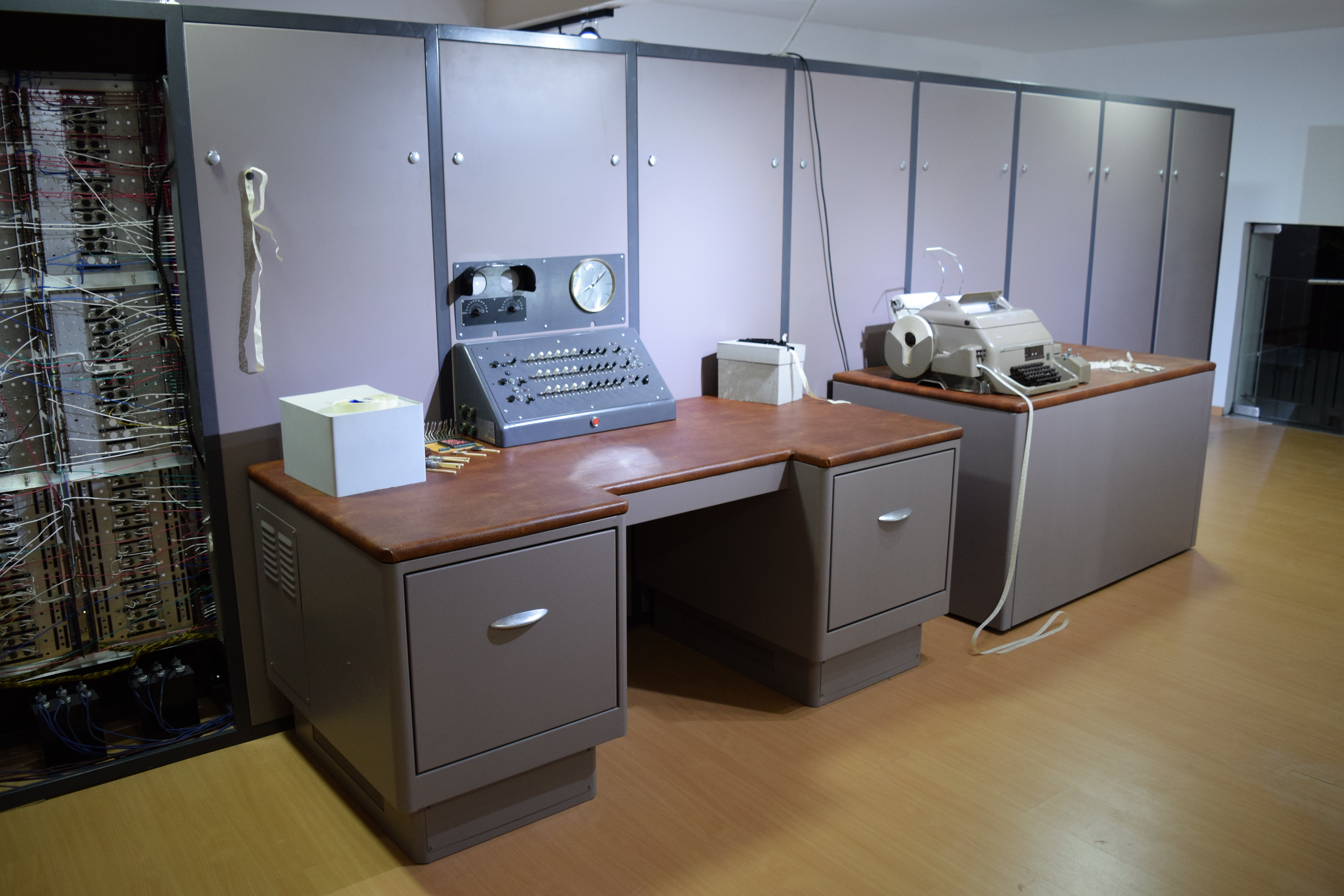
Replica of the Clementina computer

At the age of 31, Berdichevsky began her studies of mathematics with Manuel Sadosky. There she had her first experience programming the new Ferranti Mercury computer, which became known by the nickname Clementina after someone programmed it to play the American song "Oh My Darling, Clementine". In 1961, when it arrived in Buenos Aires from England, Clementina, which cost US$300,000, was the most powerful computer in the country. It was 18 metres (59 ft) long, in narrow cabinets. It was the first large computer used for scientific purposes in the country; an IBM 1401 was installed in Buenos Aires for business use that year.

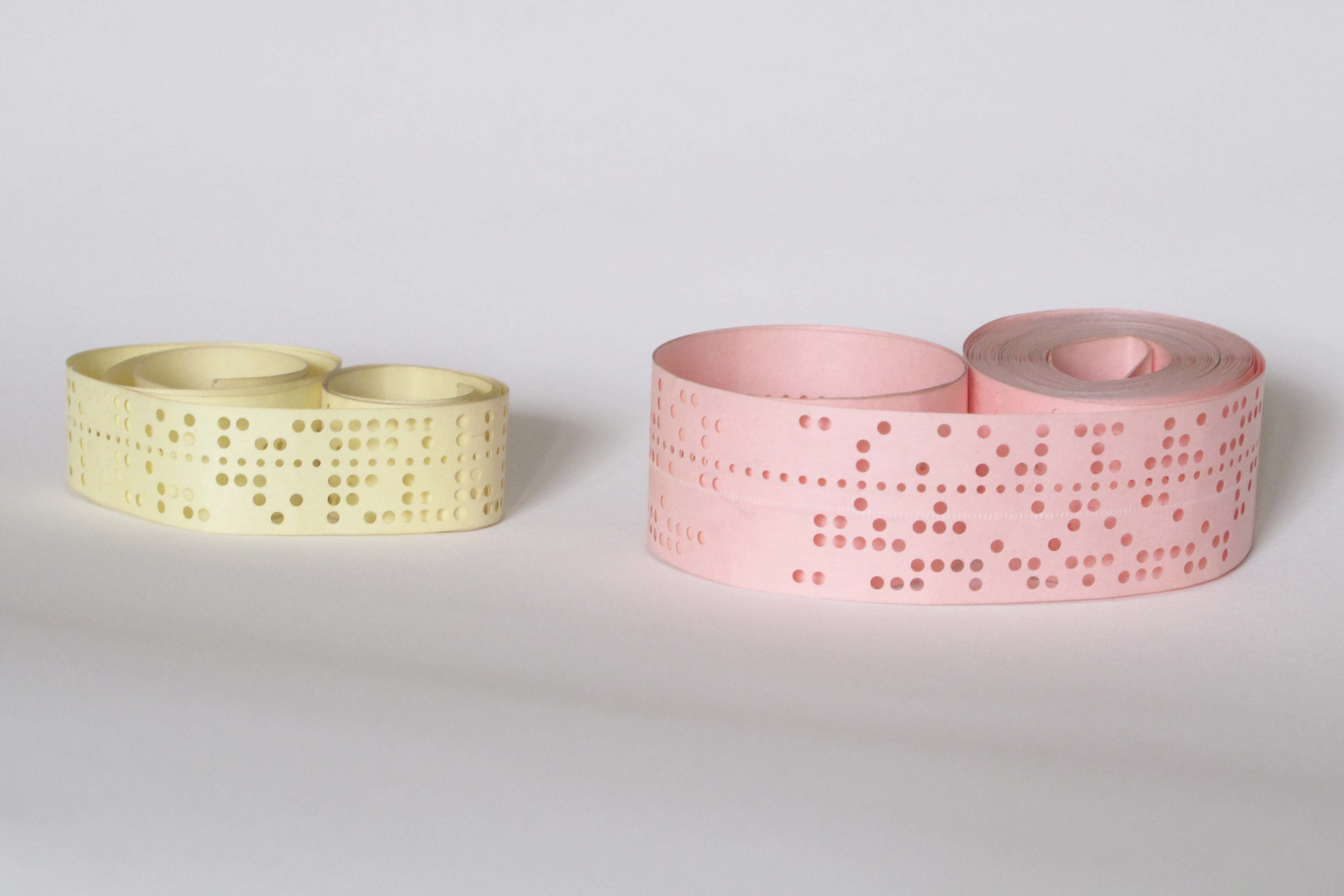
Typical paper tapes showing holes punched to input data to early computers.

The newly graduated Berdichevsky studied computing with the visiting English software engineer Cicely Popplewell (who had worked with Alan Turing in Manchester) and with the Spanish mathematician Ernesto García Camarero. Popplewell motivated Berdichevsky to write and run the first program for the new computer, which required multiple arithmetic calculations. A photoelectric device read a punched paper ribbon that was used to submit the data, and Clementina produced the desired result in seconds.

Based on Berdichevsky's progress in Argentina, in 1962 she was one of two people awarded scholarships to continue studies at the University of London's Computer Unit for five months, followed by the same length of time at a French institution. She returned home the following year as an expert on the workings of Clementina. According to Berdichevsky,

"Work with Mercury was defined by its resources and its characteristics, structure and operational capabilities, as well as by the languages, routines, stored libraries and facilities that it offered... Mercury could not perform more than one operation at the same time, and they were the three basic arithmetical operations: addition, subtraction, and multiplication."

The computer's resources included: machine language, an assembler named Pig2; a high-level programming language (a compiler) called Autocode. Later another compiler called Comic replaced Autocode. In those days, dedicated compilers were developed for each computer model; they were not developed for use on multiple models of computers until years later. Detailed information about both the Mercury hardware and the Autocode coding system is included in a downloadable Spanish-language Autocode manual.

In addition, Berdichevsky worked as a "head of practical works" of Numerical Calculus I, where the tenured professor was her mentor, Manuel Sadosky, who was vice-dean of the Faculty of Exact Sciences of the University of Buenos Aires from 1957 to 1966.

=== Coup d'état ===
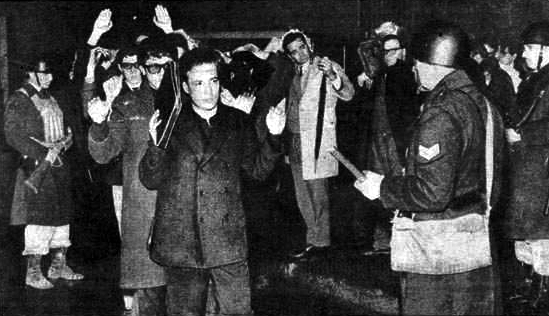
University evictions on the Night of the Long Batons, 1966

Berdichevsky worked with Sadosky's institute until an Argentine coup d'état that installed a military dictatorship, which imposed government control over the workings of the previously autonomous state universities. This intrusion led to student/professor sit-ins that resulted in the violent Night of the Long Batons on 29 July 1966 when military troops physically beat and evicted the academic occupiers from the University of Buenos Aires and other institutions of higher learning. Many academics, including Sadosky, were forced into exile.

Berdichevsky herself began working as an accountant. Between 1966 and 1970 she was also one of the directors of Scientific Technical Advisors (ACT), the company formed by her former academic associates, Manuel Sadosky, Rebeca Guber and Juan Chamero.

=== Later years ===
In 1984, Berdichevsky became Deputy General Manager of the Argentine savings bank Caja de Ahorro in charge of its computer center. She was also named the representative at the International Federation for Information Processing.

After her retirement, she continued to work as a computer consultant and participated in important international projects and organizations such as United Nations Development Program.

Cecilia Berdichevsky died in Avellaneda, Argentina, 28 February 2010.

== Published work ==
- Berdichevsky C. (2006) The Beginning of Computer Science in Argentina — Clementina – (1961–1966). In: Impagliazzo J. (eds) History of Computing and Education 2 (HCE2). IFIP Advances in Information and Communication Technology, vol 215. Springer, New York, NY (complete paper in English)
