= Instituto Politécnico Superior (Rosario) =

Coordinates: 32.9588°S 60.6292°W

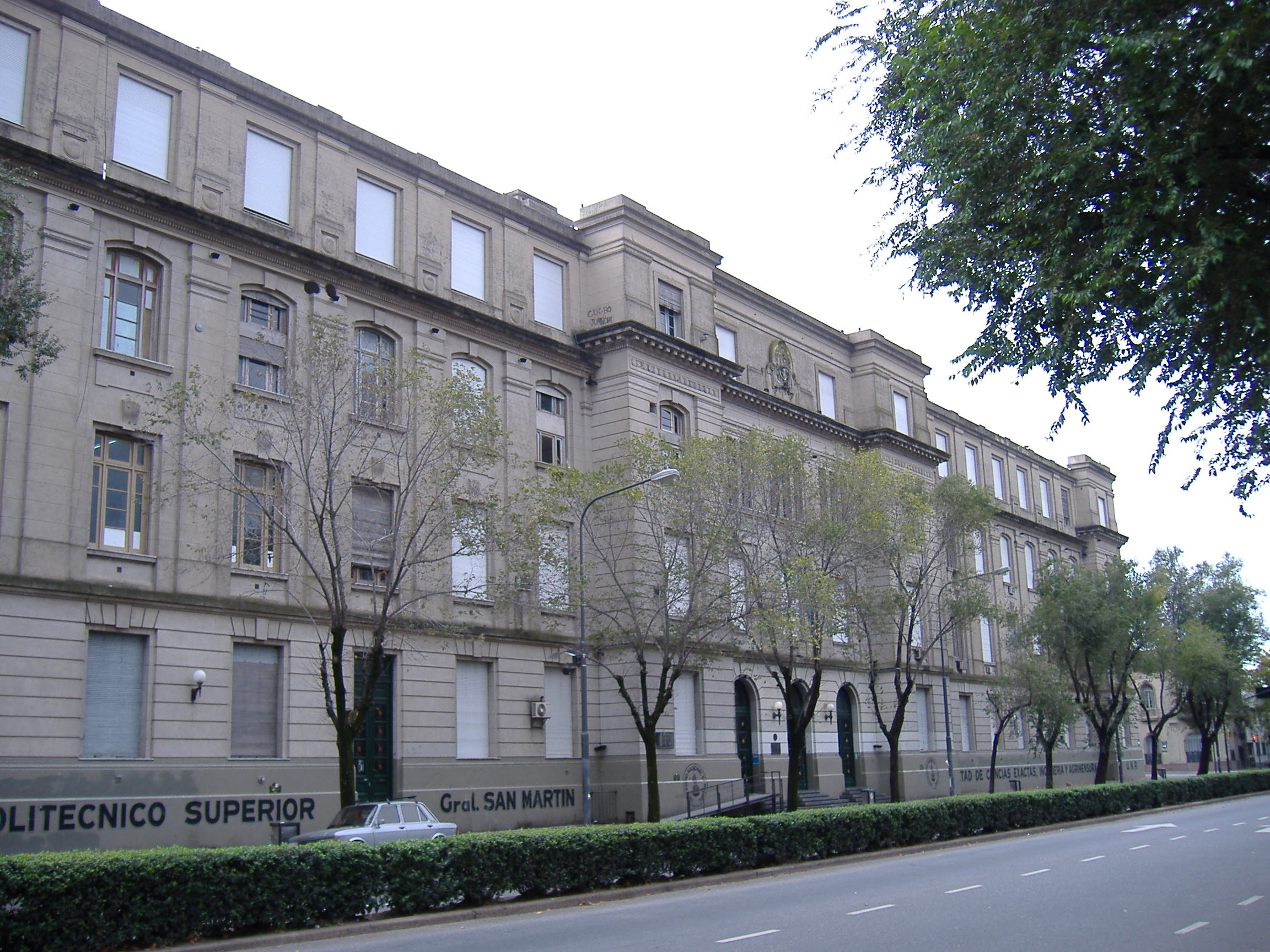
- Rosario; Argentina

Information
- Former name: Escuela Industrial de la Nación
- Affiliation: National University of Rosario

The Instituto Politécnico Superior General San Martín is a technical high school in Rosario, Argentina. It was founded in 1906 as the "Escuela Industrial de la Nación" by its first director Luis Laporte. It depends on the National University of Rosario (UNR).

The Instituto Politécnico Superior main building is located near the beginning of Pellegrini Avenue, in the southeastern border of the city center, besides the UNR's Faculty of Engineering.

== History ==
The Instituto Politécnico Superior was originally created as the Industrial School of the Nation (Escuela Industrial de la Nación) on September 26, 1906. It was inaugurated in 1907, beginning its activities with a small student population of only 28. The city of Rosario, located on the banks of the Paraná River and in the south of the province of Santa Fe, as well as its area of influence, lacked a large industrial development and the population, still dedicated almost exclusively to commercial activities and agricultural-livestock, was originally reluctant to the change that was proposed with the creation of the school. This is evident the enormous efforts required to maintain the operation of the school in its first years of existence.

Since its creation and until 1920, the school depended on the National Ministry of Public Education. In 1920, it became dependent on the National University of the Litoral, as an annex to the Faculty of Mathematical, Physical-Chemical and Natural Sciences applied to industry. From that moment on, the Industrial School became, in fact, the institution that prepared, through its middle cycle, future entrants to the university careers of said Faculty. The increase in the population, mainly due to the immigration contribution, was the main factor in the economic development of commerce and industries. Consequently, this gradual industrial development brought about a considerable increase in the number of graduates who were not pursuing university studies, but were devoting themselves fully to the labor field, with high professional qualifications. In other cases, in parallel to working as a technician, many were undertaking higher education. As a consequence, the initial objective was broadened, in the face of a new reality, being necessary to train technicians of the best professional level, regardless of whether they continued university studies. In 1961 the objectives were established in an indubitable way, when it was established that the School should not train future engineering students, nor qualified workers, but the middle layer of industry executives, who are the link between the upper and lower levels of the structure. occupational, therefore possessing its own profile. This led to the proposal of a substantial change in the study plans during 1962–63, which included the following aspects: updating of plans and programs, departmentalized teaching structure, re-equipping of laboratories and workshops, renovation of teaching materials, modification of the promotion regime and permanent evaluation of the teaching and learning process.

Compatible with the new objectives, a variant of the educational structure was produced, giving a vertical articulation at the level of 5th year, technical bachelor; with entry to any university career and a diversified technical cycle, IPR technical; with a total of 7 years of study. The new educational structure began to be applied in 1969. On March 19 of that year, the School was renamed the “General San Martín” Polytechnic Institute of Rosario, a name that was more in line with the new functions and objectives. Later, on June 25, 1970, the Polytechnic Institute became a direct dependency of the National University of Rosario, created in 1968; detaching itself from the Faculty of Exact Sciences, Engineering and Architecture, as corresponds to an institution that has its own objectives.

Later, in 1975, the institution was renamed the "General San Martín" Higher Polytechnic Institute (Instituto Politécnico Superior General San Martín), thus opening the way to teaching at the tertiary level, which in fact existed through the training of optical technicians, with a student population from, in most of them from ordinary high schools. At present, new tertiary level careers have been incorporated, to meet the demands of the professional sector.

== Notable alumni ==
- Oscar Bertone, journalist.
- Esteban Corsi (born 1995), waterpolo player.
- Roberto Fontanarrosa (1944–2007), writer. Attended three years.
- Pablo Granados (born 1965), musician.
- Miguel Lifschitz (1955–2021), mayor of Rosario y governor of Santa Fe.
- Stefan Moszoro-Dąbrowski, first regional vicar of the Opus Dei in Poland
- Pachu Peña (born 1962), comedian and actor
- Luis Rubio (born 1965), actor and creator of the fictitious football player Eber Ludueña.

== Taburetazo ==
Every year, a massive alumni meeting takes place on September 25. This meeting is known as taburetazo in honor of the stool or taburete, which every first year student fabricates in the school and turned into a symbol of the institute.
