= Tulio Halperín Donghi =

Argentine historian (1926–2014)

Tulio Halperin Donghi (October 27, 1926 – November 14, 2014) was an Argentine historian. After earning a Ph.D in history and a law degree at the University of Buenos Aires, he taught at the institution's Faculty of Arts from 1955 to 1966. Halperin Donghi then moved to the National University of the Litoral, where he served as Dean of the Faculty of Philosophy, History and Ciences. He later taught at Oxford University, and became a faculty member of the University of California, Berkeley in 1972.

== Biography ==
Halperin Donghi was born in Buenos Aires in 1926. He received both a juris doctor and a Doctorate in History from the University of Buenos Aires in 1955. Halperín became a renowned Latin American historian.

Exiled in 1966, following the Noche de los Bastones Largos [Night of the Long Batons], he divided his time between the University of California and the University of Buenos Aires. Halperin was given an award for Scholarly Distinction from the American Historical Association in 1998, and authored numerous books.

== Books ==
- Un conflicto nacional: moriscos y cristianos viejos en Valencia, 1957 ISBN 9788437084121
- Tradición política española e ideología revolucionaria de Mayo, 1961
- Historia contemporánea de América Latina, 1967 ISBN 9788420676135 (other editions
- El Río de la Plata al comenzar el siglo XIX, 1961
- Historia de la Universidad de Buenos Aires, 1962
- Revolución y Guerra: Formación de una élite dirigente en la Argentina criolla, 1972 ISBN 9789871220236
- The Aftermath of Revolution in Latin America (translation of Hispanoamérica después de la independencia), 1973
- Politics, Economics and Society in Argentina in the Revolutionary Period (translation of Revolución y Guerra), 1975 ISBN 9780521109031
- La democracia de masas, 1991
- The Contemporary History of Latin America (translation of Historia de América Latina), 1993 ISBN 9780822313748
- Proyecto y construcción de una Nación, 1996 ISBN 9788466000390
- Son Memorias, 2008 ISBN 9789871220908
- La Argentina y la Tormenta Del Mundo: Ideas e Ideologías Entre 1930 y 1945 ISBN 9789871105311
