= Facultad de Ciencias Exactas, Ingeniería y Agrimensura (UNR) =

Coordinates: 32°57′33.3″S 60°37′43.9″W

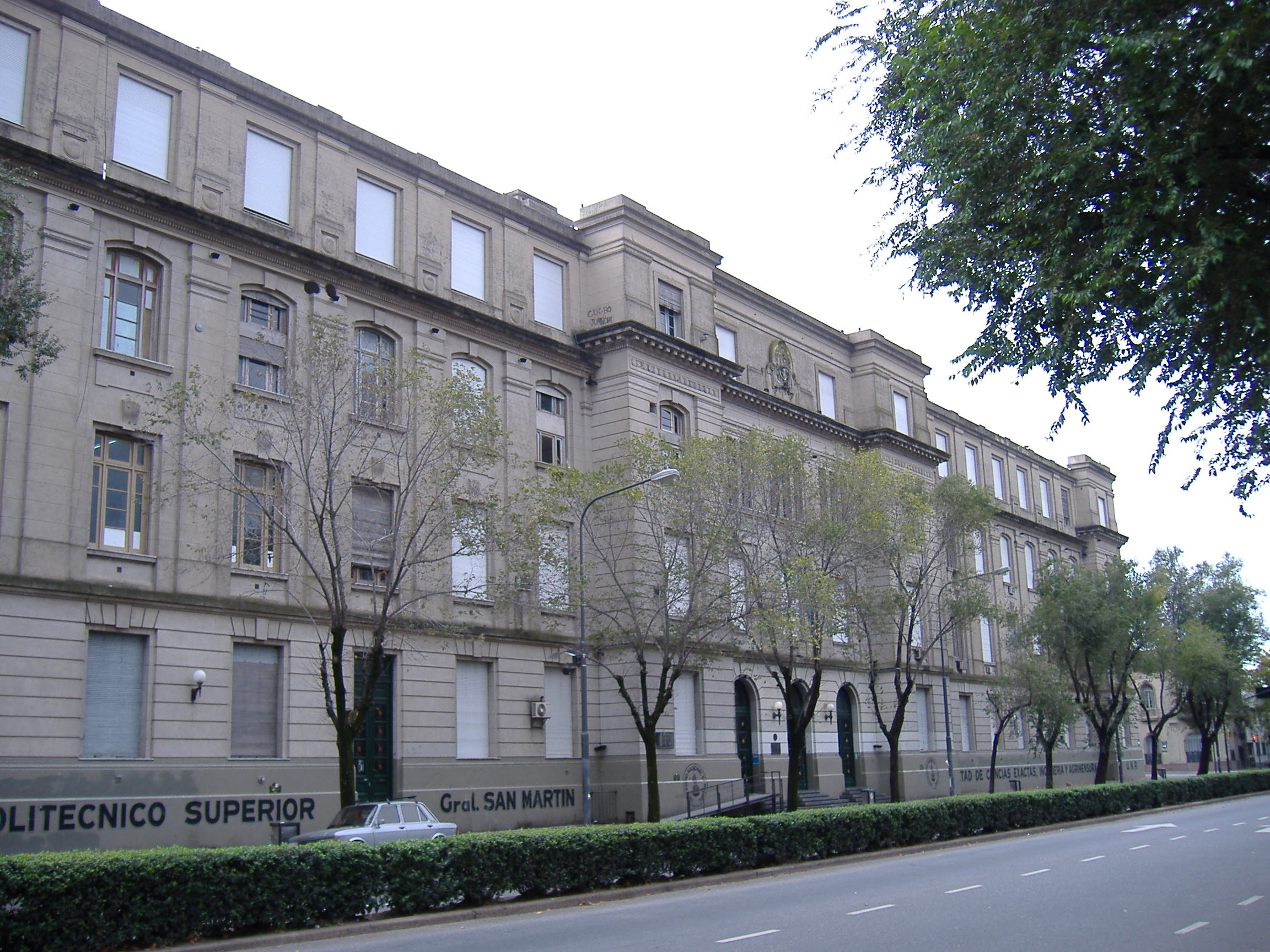
- The building of the FCEIA on Pellegrini Avenue, Rosario
- Type: Public
- Established: 1920
- Parent institution: UNR
- Affiliations: Instituto Politécnico Superior
- Dean: Oscar Peire (Electronics engineering)
- Location: Rosario, Santa Fe, Argentina
- Website: www.fceia.unr.edu.ar

The Faculty of Exact Sciences, Engineering and Surveying (Facultad de Ciencias Exactas, Ingeniería y Agrimensura) of the National University of Rosario (UNR) is an institution of higher learning in Rosario, Argentina.

== Description ==
The faculty consists of the Institute of Mechanical systems, Institute of Geology, Institute of Mathematics and the Institute of Physics. The faculty shares its main campus, located on Pellegrini Avenue (Rosario), with the Instituto Politécnico Superior, a high school that is also affiliated with the UNR.

=== Courses ===
As of 2019, the Faculty offers 11 graduate degree programs: six are in Engineering, Civil engineering, Electrical engineering, Electronics engineering, Industrial engineering and Mechanical engineering. Three offer Licenciate titles in Physics, Mathematics and Computer science, and there are a Professorship of Mathematics and a Professorship of Physics. It also provides post-graduate courses and long-distance education in Surveying (agrimensura).

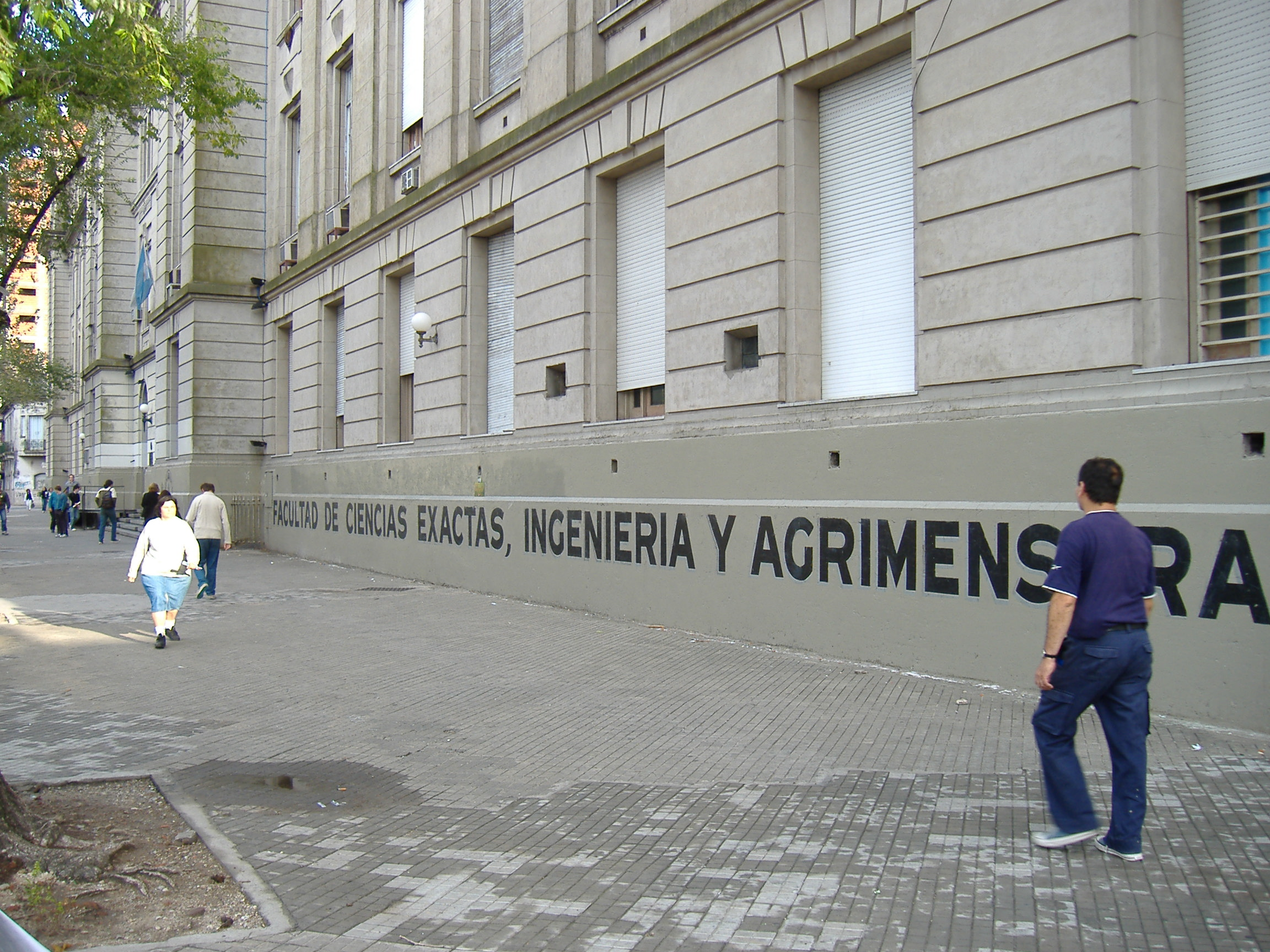
Sidewalk view.

=== Laboratories ===
There are numerous laboratories, namely for Metallurgy, Hydraulics, Acoustics, Infomatics, Thermodynamics, Physics, Microelectronics, Chemistry and Microbiology, Electric machines, Electric material and Meteorology.

As of October 2015 the college's undated website listed the following 23 laboratory names: Acoustics and Electro acoustics Laboratory, Standards Testing Laboratory, Laboratorio de ensayos, investigación y desarrollos eléctricos (LEIDE), Structures Laboratory, Extension Laboratory – School of Electrical Engineering, Laboratory of Extension and Research on Electrical Materials, Rosario Laboratory of Physics, Hydraulics Laboratory, two Computing Science laboratories, Electric Machines Laboratory, Materials Laboratory, Electrical Measurements Laboratory, Metallurgy Laboratory, Legal and Mechanical Metrology Laboratory, Microelectronics Laboratory, Water Chemistry and Microbiology Laboratory, Dynamical Systems and Information Processing Laboratory, Soil Laboratory, Materials Technology Laboratory, Educational Technology Laboratory, Applied Thermodynamics Laboratory, and Road Materials Laboratory.

The university also has a nuclear reactor laboratory not listed with the above. The nuclear reactor, a Siemens SUR 100 for teaching/training purposes with a permanent power of 1000 milliwatt, was donated by the then Federal Republic of Germany in November 1969, and delivered by a German cargo ship with nuclear propulsion named 'Otto Hahn' in July 1971.

In 2006, the UNR Faculty received "el Premio SECyT a la Empresa Innovadora – Año 2006 por la Región Centro" (the 2006 Science and Technology Award for Business Innovation – by the Central Region, presented by the national Secretariat of Science and Technology of the Ministry of Education.
