= Daniela De Silva =

Italian mathematician

Daniela De Silva is an Italian mathematician known for her expertise in partial differential equations. She is an associate professor of mathematics at Barnard College and Columbia University.

== Education and career ==
De Silva did her undergraduate studies in mathematics at the University of Naples Federico II, and earned a bachelor's degree there in 1997. She completed her doctorate at the Massachusetts Institute of Technology in 2005. Her dissertation, Existence and Regularity of Monotone Solutions to a Free Boundary Problem, was supervised by David Jerison.

After postdoctoral research at the Mathematical Sciences Research Institute and a term as J. J. Sylvester Assistant Professor at Johns Hopkins University, she joined the Barnard and Columbia faculty in 2007.

== Recognition ==
De Silva won the 2016 Sadosky Prize of the Association for Women in Mathematics for "fundamental contributions to the regularity theory of nonlinear elliptic partial differential equations and non-local integro-differential equations". In 2018, Barnard honored her with their Tow Professorship for Distinguished Scholars and Practitioners.
