= Pellegrini Avenue (Rosario) =

Street in Rosario, Argentina

Coordinates: 32°57′24″S 60°38′38″W

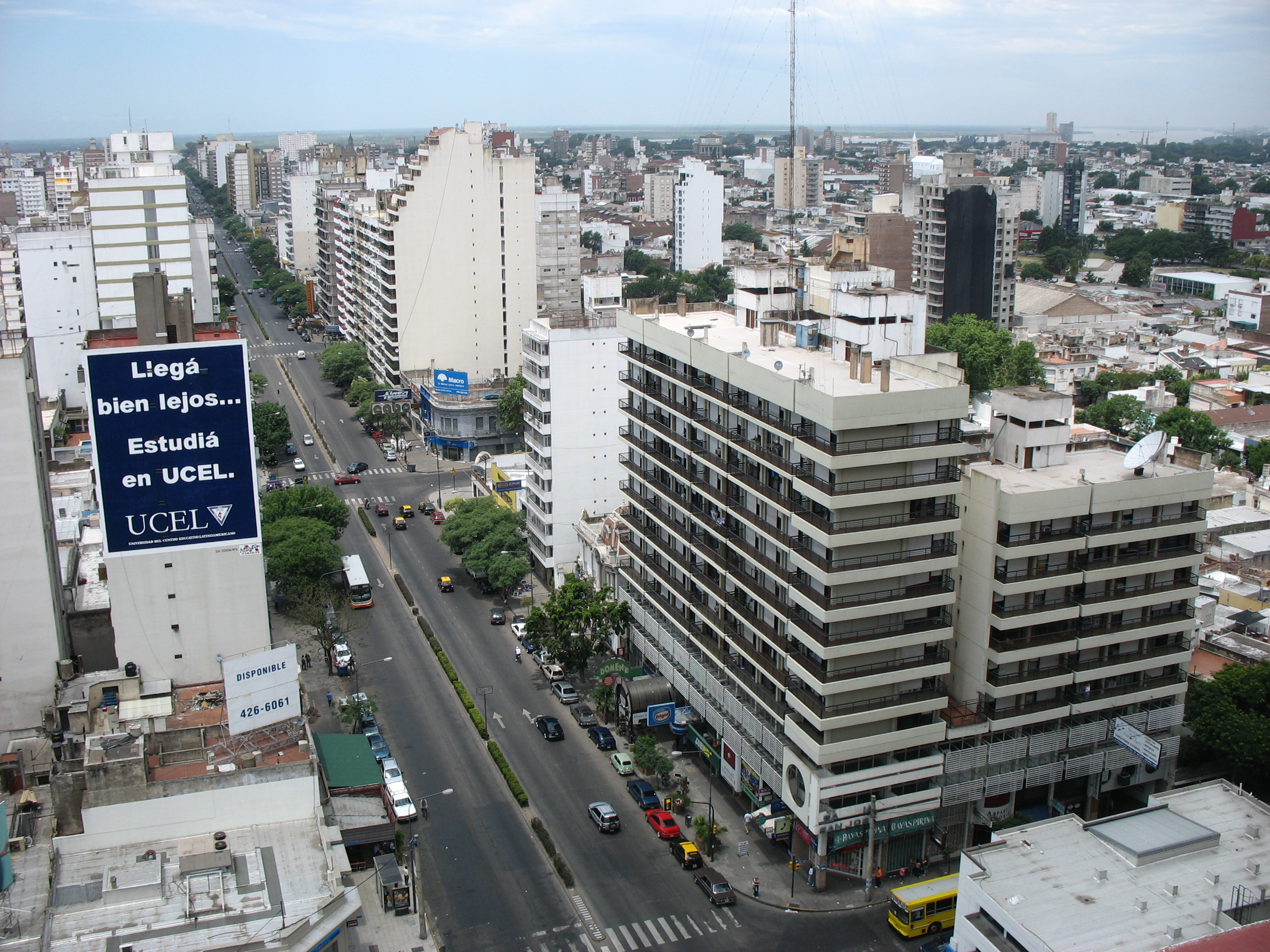
Pellegrini Avenue, looking east

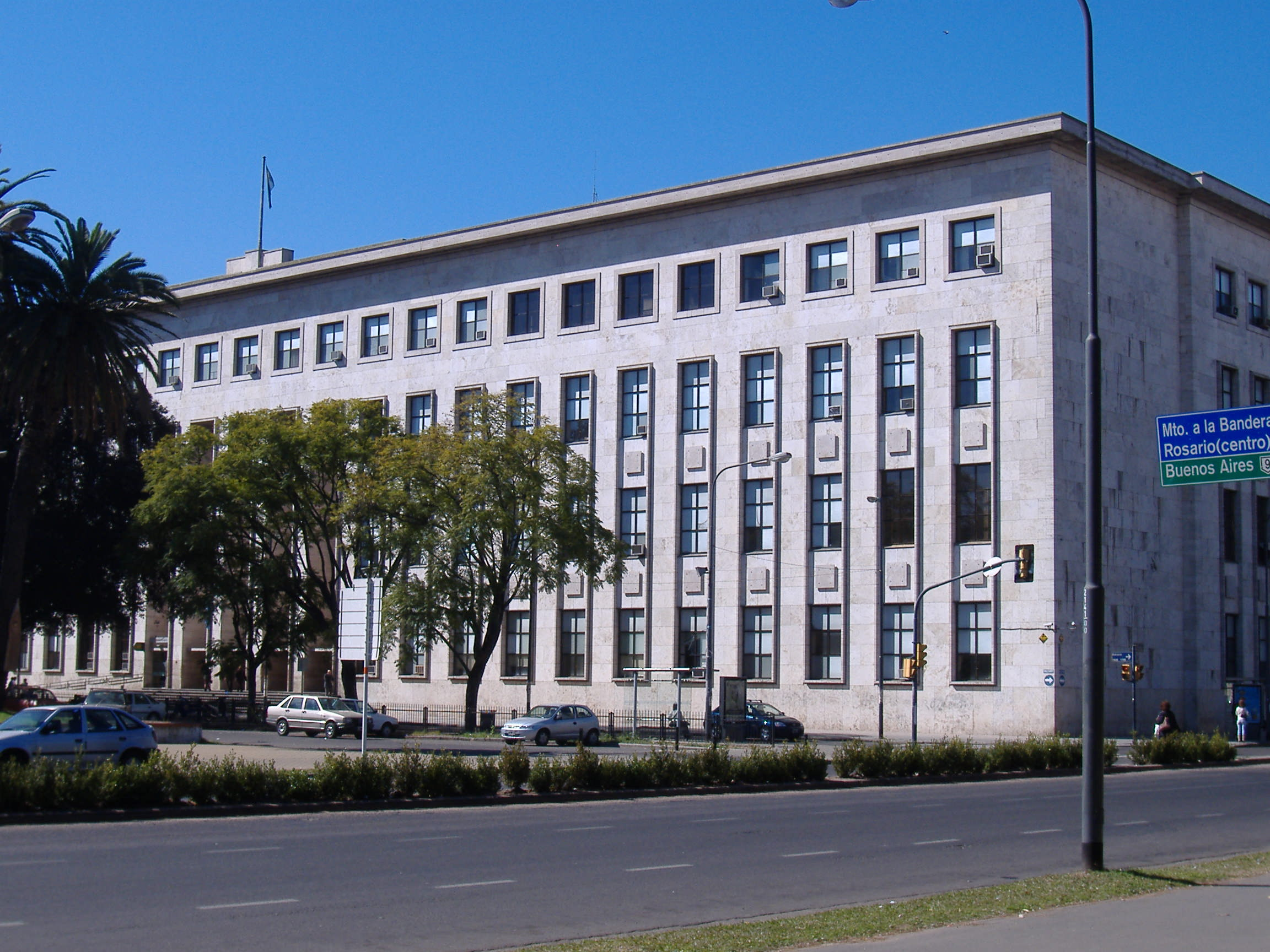
Rosario Tribunals Courthouse

Pellegrini Avenue (in Spanish, Avenida Pellegrini) is a street in Rosario, Santa Fe Province, Argentina. It is a two-way avenue that runs east–west through the center-south of the city, from the coastal avenue by the Paraná River to the western limit of the urbanized area. Together with the river and with Oroño Boulevard, it also marks the unofficial limit of the downtown area.

The avenue has two wide lanes and a narrow central reservation, usually lined with small trees and bushes. It starts near the shore of the Paraná River and climbs towards the downtown between grassy slopes formed by elevated level sidewalks. East of this area there lies the Parque Urquiza. Upon reaching the level of the rest of the central city area, it passes by the massive building that hosts the School of Engineering of the National University of Rosario, as well as its affiliated Politécnico secondary school. It then becomes a highly commercial street, hosting a large number of fine restaurants, canteens, bars, pizza parlours and icecream shops. A few blocks to the west lie the Tribunals of Rosario. Its intersection with Oroño Boulevard marks one of the corners of the Parque de la Independencia, which is the city's largest green area.

Pellegrini is also one of Rosario's arterial roads and one of its primary accesses from the west. After crossing the whole city, it turns into the Rosario–Córdoba Highway.

The avenue was inaugurated in 1868 as Bulevar Argentino, as part of a program of the municipality (created 6 years before) to beautify the city, then home to 23,000 residents, and which also included the opening of Oroño Boulevard (then Bulevar Santafesino). Its current name is an homage to Carlos Pellegrini (president of Argentina from to 1890 to 1892).
