= Rebeca Guber =

Argentine mathematician (1926–2020)

Rebeca Cherep de Guber
- Born: Rebeca Cherep; 2 July 1926; Buenos Aires, Argentina
- Died: 25 August 2020 (aged 94); Buenos Aires, Argentina
- Occupations: mathematician, computer scientist
- Spouse: José Guber
- Children: Rosana Guber

Rebeca Cherep de Guber (2 July 1926 – 25 August 2020) was an Argentine mathematician, university professor, textbook author, and 1960s pioneer in the development of computer science in Argentina.

Guber died in 2020 from COVID-19.

== Biography ==
Rebeca Cherep was born in Avellaneda, a suburb of Buenos Aires, Argentina. She completed her undergraduate studies at the National University of La Plata, earned her PhD in mathematics, and taught at the Faculties of Exact and Natural Sciences and Engineering at the University of Buenos Aires.

She married José Guber, an engineer, and they had at least one child, Rosana Guber.

In 1960, she was part of the group of scientists and teachers who created the Argentine Calculation Society, under the direction of Manuel Sadosky, with whom, years before, she had written the textbook, Elements of Differential and Integral Calculus. In the years since its first publication, the text has been widely disseminated among advanced students of science and engineering, and republished many times.

=== Calculation Institute ===
The Calculation Institute (IC) of the Faculty of Exact and Natural Sciences was created around 1959. Rebeca Guber took over as Technical Secretary on June 6, 1960. A few months later, the computer named Clementina (which was installed in 18 metal cabinets stretching 18 metres (59 ft) long) became known as the first computer installed for scientific research in Argentina and began its operations at the IC. About her work there, Guber has recalled:

"After 1955, Manuel [Sadosky] became a professor of the Analysis I course and I was his head of practical work. When the Calculation Institute was created, Manuel called me to be his chief of operations. It was a very busy and rewarding time. Manuel outlined the policies and I made sure that everything went as planned. He had to handle a group of seventy people."

Guber's work proved to be fundamental in the entire process of installation and development of the famous Clementina.

Rebeca Guber, along with her colleague and friend Cecilia Berdichevsky, are only two of the female mathematicians who were fundamental to the success of the early development of information science in Argentina.

=== University closure ===
In 1966, with Argentina's coup d'état that removed the president from power and culminated in the Night of the Long Batons, scientists and researchers massively resigned from institutes and universities. The Calculation Institute of the Faculty of Exact and Natural Sciences was "practically dismantled." After Rebeca Guber, Juan Ángel Chamero and David Jacovkis resigned their positions there and under the leadership of Manuel Sadosky, they founded a consultancy firm called Scientific Technical Advisors (ACT), in part to prevent the institute's lines of research and work from being totally abandoned.

=== Secretariat of Science and Technology ===
After the return of Argentinian democracy and the election of president Raúl Alfonsín at the end of 1983, Guber continued to work with Sadosky when he was named the Nation's Secretariat of Science and Technology.

=== Legacy ===
In tribute to her, in the Calculus Institute there is a room that bears her name: Rebeca Cherep de Guber Classroom.

== Selected publications ==
- Rebeca Guber; François Le Lionnais; Néstor Míguez; Luis Antonio Santaló, Las grandes corrientes del pensamiento matemático. Buenos Aires : Editora Universitaria de Buenos Aires, 1962. (in Spanish)
- Sadosky, Manuel; Guber, Rebeca Ch de, Elementos de cálculo diferencial e integral, Buenos Aires: Alsina, 1982. (in Spanish)
