= Alejandrina Cristia =

Argentinian researcher

- Occupation: Research Director

Academic background
- Education: Universidad Nacional de Rosario; Purdue University
- Website: Alex Cristia

Alejandrina Cristia is an Argentinian linguist known for research on infant-directed speech, daylong audio recordings of children's diverse linguistic environments, and language acquisition across cultures. Cristia is interested in how phonetic and phonological representations are formed during infancy and their interactions with other linguistic formats and cognitive mechanisms. She holds the position of Research Director of the Laboratoire de Sciences Cognitives et Psycholinguistique (LSCP) at the Paris Sciences et Lettres University (PSL University).

== Biography ==
Cristia received her B.A. degree in Letters at Universidad Nacional de Rosario in 2004. She attended graduate school at Purdue University where she obtained a M.A. degree with honors in General Linguistics in 2006 and a Ph.D. degree in Linguistics in 2009 under the supervision of Amanda Seidl. Her doctorate dissertation titled Individual Variation in Infant Speech Perception: Implications for Language Acquisition Theories examined the language-specific and domain-general factors in relation to infants' processing of speech sounds. Cristia reported that language-specific factors affected infants' performance more than domain-general factors.

From 2009 to 2011, Cristia worked as a post-doctoral fellow at the LSCP in Paris, France. Later, she joined the Max Planck Institute for Psycholinguistics as a scientific staff member. In 2013, Cristia became a researcher at the French National Centre for Scientific Research (CNRS) in Paris, France.

Cristia is a member of the LSCP Babylab and the Daylong recordings of Children's Language Environment (DARCLE) network. She is also engaged in the MetaLab project in early language acquisition and cognitive development, and the HomeBank Project.

== Awards ==
Cristia received Annual Prize of the Academia Argentina de Letras in 2005. She received the James S. McDonnell Scholar Award in Understanding Human Cognition in 2017. In 2020, she received the CNRS Bronze medal for her research on language acquisition across cultures.

In December 2020, The Département d'Etudes Cognitives (DEC) of Ecole normale supérieure (ENS) awarded her an ERC Consolidator Grant for her "Experience effects in early language acquisition" project.

== Research ==
Cristia's research program examines language acquisition across cultures. She uses innovative research methods including behavioral methods, neuroimaging, and corpus analyses to measure children's speech perception and language development.

During her graduate studies, Cristia's research focused on caregivers' influence on infants' acquisition of speech sounds, and infants ability to track distributions of acoustic cues. In one of her studies with Amanda Seidl, Cristia investigated 7-month-old infants' learning of an artificial grammar, and found that infants had the ability to generate some levels of constraints and further generalize them to other related phonemes. Other research has examined the role of infant-directed speech in language development, indicating that it provides both emotional and linguistic input to assist children's language acquisition.

Besides, using randomly or periodically sampled daylong recordings, Cristia's 2020 study conducted with several other scholars across various labs evaluated the accuracy of the LENA system (a combined daylong audio-recorder and automated algorithmic analysis) in terms of the full set of its key outcome measures, namely speaker classification accuracy, child vocalization counts, conversational turn counts, and adult word counts. LENA system is known for assessing children's language environment. This study found that the LENA system is good at detecting female and the target child voices, and the system can also accurately capture the child's vocalizations while not with other talkers' vocalizations.

== Selected publications ==
- Cristia, A. (2013). Input to language: The phonetics and perception of infant-directed speech. Language and Linguistics Compass, 7(3), 157-170.
- Cristia, A. (2022). A systematic review suggests marked differences in the prevalence of infant-directed vocalization across groups of populations. Developmental Science, e13265.
- Cristia, A., Dupoux, E., Gurven, M., & Stieglitz, J. (2019). Child-directed speech is infrequent in a forager-farmer population: A time allocation study. Child Development, 90(3), 759-773.
- Cristia, A., Lavechin, M., Scaff, C., Soderstrom, M., Rowland, C. F., Räsänen, O., Bunce, J., & Bergelson, E. (2021). A thorough evaluation of the Language Environment Analysis (LENA) system. Behavior Research Methods, 53, 467-486.
- Cristia, A., & Seidl, A. (2014). The hyperarticulation hypothesis of infant-directed speech. Journal of Child Language, 41(4), 913-934.
- Cristia, A., & Seidl, A. (2015). Parental reports on touch screen use in early childhood. PloS one, 10(6), e0128338.
