= Delia Crovi Druetta =

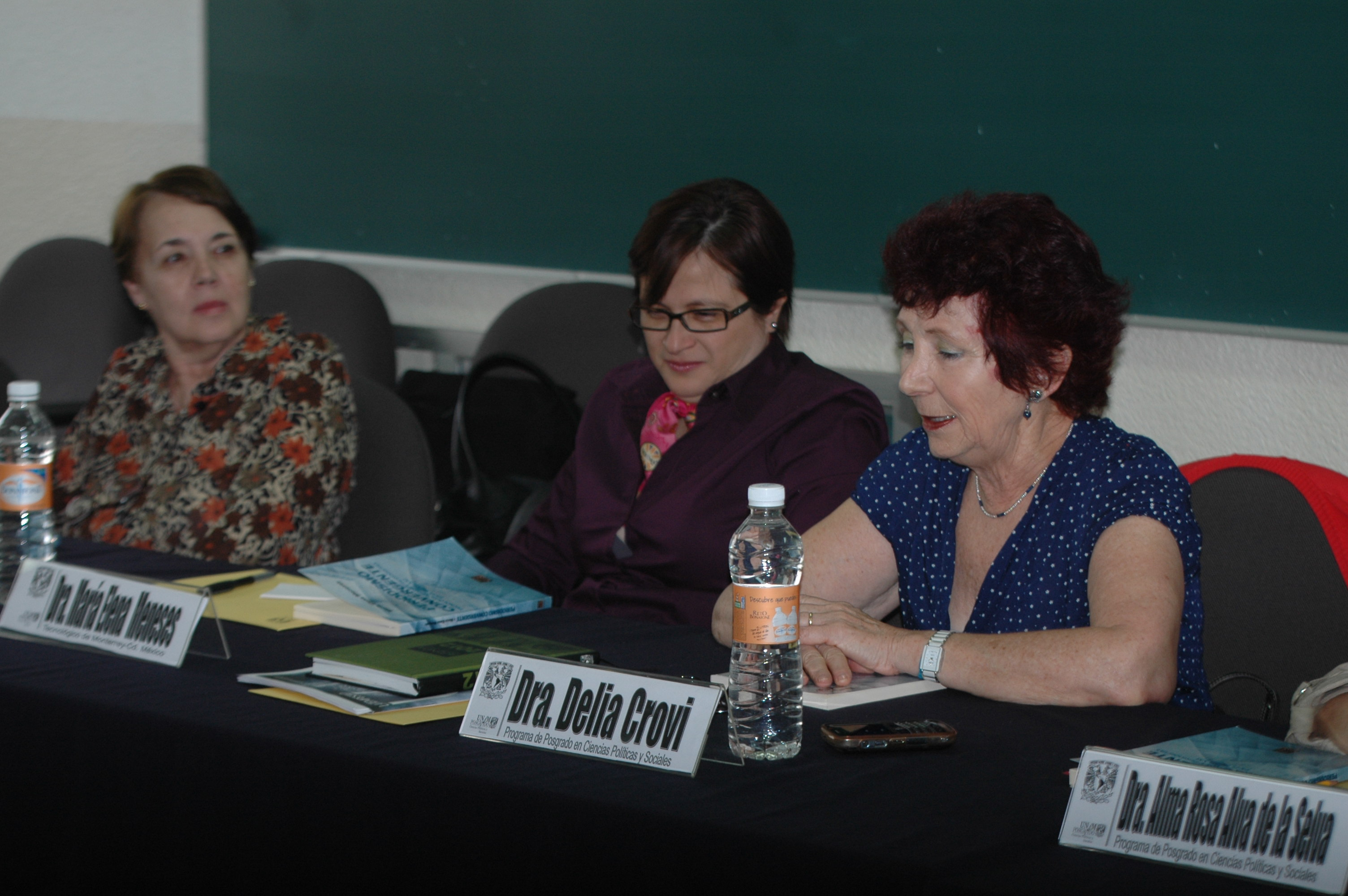
Dr Delia Crovi presenting on a panel at the Monterrey Institute of Technology and Higher Education, Mexico City.

Delia Crovi Druetta is a professor and researcher in communications and Latin American studies at the Universidad Nacional Autónoma de México, member of the Sistema Nacional de Investigadores, Level III.

== Education ==
Crovi Druetta was born in Argentina, receiving her bachelor's degree in journalism and information sciences from the Pontifical Catholic University of Argentina in 1971, followed by a master's degree in communication and development from the Universidad Iberoamericana in 1981 and a master's degree in communication sciences from the Universidad Nacional Autónoma de México in 1991. In 1995, she received her doctorate in Latin American Studies from the Universidad Nacional Autónoma de México.

== Career prior to UNAM ==
Crovi Druetta has worked in mass media and academia since her undergraduate years. In the 1970s, she worked in newspapers as a journalist for publications such as Diarios Hoy, Noticias de Rosario and El Mundo de Buenos Aires as well as radio stations such as LR5 Radio Nacional Rosario, LT8 Radio Rosario and Radio Cerealist in Rosario as well as a producer and anchor for Channels 3 and 5 in Rosario and Channel 9 in Buenos Aires. After moving to Mexico, worked as a scriptwriter and program producer for the Secretaría de Educación Pública and continued as a journalist with publications such as Mexicana de Comunicación, Red, De par en par, Sección Pantalla Casera and La Jornada, continuing into the 1990s. In 1997, she was the presenter for the series Temas de Comunicación Educativa, broadcast by EDUSAT and ILCE in Mexico City. From 1979 to 1996 she also worked with various companies as a free-lance producer on video productions.

In addition, she has also worked a various universities from Argentina to Mexico, starting with the Universidad Nacional de Rosario in 1971 and teaching communications at the Universidad Católica in 1972, then moving onto the Centro de Investigación en Comunicación Masiva in Buenos Aires in 1974. In 1977 she moved to the University of Panama working with the Grupo Experimental de Cine Universitario until 1979. In 1979, she moved to Mexico to take a position with the Instituto Indigenista Interamericano, which was following in 1981 working as a communications analyst with the Sistema Alimentaro Mexicano of the federal government. In 1983, she took a position with the Secretaría de Educación Pública, working first as an audiovisual specialist then became head of the social communications research and evaluation department and coordinator of research projects by 1985.

== UNAM ==
Since the 1990s, Crovi Druetta has been associated with the Universidad Nacional Autónoma de México, today a full-time professor with the Faculty of Political and Social Sciences and research associate with the Centro de Estudios en Ciencias de la Comunicación.

She has taught undergraduate and graduate classes in Mexico, Argentina, Colombia, Spain, Nicaragua and Panama, as well as with the Instituto Latinoamericano de la Comunicación Educativa.

Her research specialties are digitalization, information in society, the technological divide, cultural industries in Mexico and communication and education. In addition, she has directed numerous dissertations at the masters and doctorate level and has evaluated virtual and face-to-face educational programs since 2005.

She notes that technology has had a large impact on communications research, even pushing out research work in other questions in the field and feels that other academic fields do not appreciate the importance of communications.

== Recognitions ==
Since the 1990s, she has served on various coordinations and committees in professional organizations. Since 1992 she has coordinated the Communication and Education work group of the Asociación Latinoamericana de Investigadores de la Comunicación. Currently she is a member of the science committee of the Asociación Mexicana de Investigadores de la Comunicación, the science director of the Unión Latina de Economía and the coordinator of Política de la Información, la Comunicación y la Cultura.

In 2007, she was a candidate for the Premio Universidad Nacional in the social science category.

She is a member of the Sistema Nacional de Investigadores, Level III.

== Books ==
She has authored various books on communications as well as academic articles. Books include:

- Metología para la producción y evaluación de materiales didactivos (1990)
- Ser joven a fin de siglo. Influencia de la televisión en las opiniones políticas de los jóvenes (1998)
- Tecnología satelital para la enseñana (1998)
- La convergenica tenológica en los escenarios laborales de la juventud (2001)
- Periodismo digital en México (2007)
- Comunicación educativa y mediaciones tecnológicas. Hacia nuevos ambientos de aprendizaje (2007)
- Redes sociales:Análisis y applicaciones (2009)
- Acceso, uso y apropiación de la tic en comunicades académicas. Diagnóstico en la UNAM (2009)
- La Faena de lo incierto. Medios de comunicación y construcción social de la incertidumbre (2009)
