= Ángela Romera Vera =

Argentine legal scholar

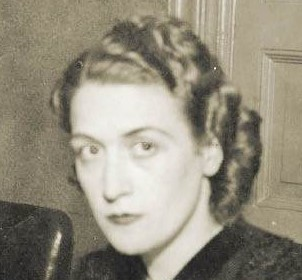

Ambassador of Argentina to Panama
- In office October 1958 – April 1962
- President: Arturo Frondizi

Personal details
- Born: Ángela Constantina Romera Vera; 11 March 1912 Córdoba Province, Argentina
- Died: 4 June 1990 (aged 78) Santa Fe, Argentina
- Education: University of Zaragoza; Complutense University of Madrid
- Occupation: Legal scholar

Ángela Constantina Romera Vera (11 March 1912 – 4 June 1990) was an Argentine legal scholar. Her country's first woman ambassador, she served as Argentina's representative in Panama from 1958 to 1962.

== Biography ==
Ángela Romera Vera was born in Córdoba Province on 3 March 1912. At age four she emigrated to Spain, where she studied law and philosophy at the University of Zaragoza and the Complutense University of Madrid. At the latter, she was a student of José Ortega y Gasset. She returned to Argentina in 1936 after the outbreak of the Spanish Civil War.

She ratified her doctorate in legal and social sciences at the National University of the Littoral (UNL) in Santa Fe, where she served as a full professor of sociology and interim adjunct of philosophy of law. She was also a teacher at the Faculty of Education Sciences in Paraná, and taught philosophy, letters, and education sciences in Rosario. She was a member of the Directive Council of Law and the UNL Superior Council. In 1958, she played a prominent role, along with other women, in the reform of the university statute.

That October, she was appointed ambassador to Panama by President Arturo Frondizi. She was the first Argentine woman to hold the position of ambassador. She left the embassy in April 1962.

Ángela Romera Vera died in Santa Fe on 4 June 1990.

In 2012, she was the subject of a tribute by the UNL Cultural Forum.
