= Jana Rodriguez Hertz =

Argentine-born Uruguayan mathematician

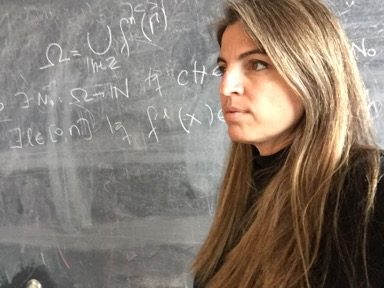
- Jana Rodriguez Hertz in 2016.
- Born: María Alejandra Rodríguez Hertz Furgoni; 11 February 1970 (age 56); Rosario, Argentina
- Education: National University of Rosario
- Occupations: mathematician, professor, researcher
- Spouse: Raúl Ures
- Children: Matías, Andrés

Signature
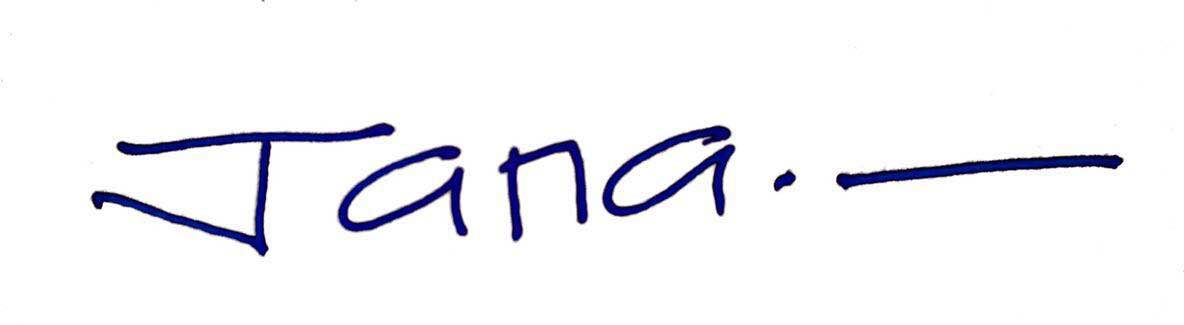

María Alejandra (Jana) Rodriguez Hertz Frugoni (born 11 February 1970) is an Argentine and Uruguayan mathematician, professor, and researcher.

== Biography ==
Rodriguez Hertz was born on February 11, 1970, in Rosario, Argentina. She studied mathematics at the Facultad de Ciencias Exactas, Ingeniería y Agrimensura of the National University of Rosario, Rosario, Argentina, earning a bachelor's degree there in 1994. She earned a doctorate from the University of the Republic in Montevideo, Uruguay, in 1999.

Formerly a professor at the Faculty of Engineering at the University of the Republic, she became the first and only woman with a Grade 5 in mathematics in Uruguay. Since 2016 she has been a professor at the Southern University of Science and Technology in China.

In 2016, Rodriguez Hertz was elected a Regional Vice President, Latin America & the Caribbean, of the Organization for Women in Science for the Developing World for the period of 2016–20.

Her husband is Raúl Ures; they are the parents of two children.

== Contributions ==
Rodriguez Hertz works on dynamical systems and ergodic theory.

Since 2011, Rodriguez Hertz has been involved in the Uruguayan educational debate. She has participated in numerous interviews, public events and conferences on the subject. She has developed a critical point of view on the educational budget, PISA tests, teaching career development, and other topics. Her particular point of view made her a benchmark of public opinion on the issues. She has been a columnist in different media, highlighting her participation in 2014 in the "La Tertulia" episode of the program En Perspectiva by Emiliano Cotelo on Radio El Espectador, as well as the "Jana y sus hermanas" and the "Suena Tremendo" episodes on the same radio station. She is also the author of the blog, "¿Y por qué no?".

== Awards and honours ==
- 1992, Premio Jóvenes Notables, Fundación Bolsa de Comercio de Buenos Aires.
- 1999, Investigadora Grado 3, PEDECIBA Matemática.
- 2004, Premio Fondo Nacional de Investigadores, CONICYT.
- 2009, Investigadora Nivel II, Sistema Nacional de Investigadores, SNI, ANII.
- 2013, Investigadora de Primer Nivel, Grado 5, Programa de Desarrollo de las Ciencias Básicas (PEDECIBA).
