= Robin Neumayer =

American mathematician

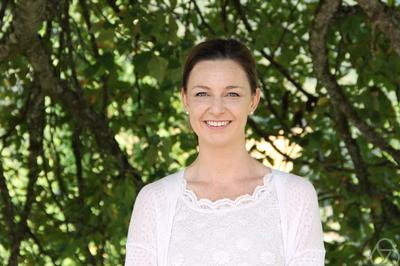
Neumayer at Oberwolfach in 2018

Robin Tonra Neumayer is an American mathematician, the recipient of the 2024 Sadosky Prize in mathematical analysis. Her research connects the calculus of variations, partial differential equations, and geometric analysis, and includes the study of geometric aspects of Sobolev-type inequalities, isoperimetric inequalities, and the Rayleigh–Faber–Krahn inequality. She is an assistant professor of mathematics at Carnegie Mellon University.

== Education and career ==
Neumayer majored in mathematics, with a business minor, at the University of South Carolina. She graduated summa cum laude in 2012. She continued her studies in mathematics at the University of Texas at Austin, where she received a master's degree in 2014 and completed her Ph.D. in 2017. Her doctoral dissertation, Minimality and stability properties in Sobolev and isoperimetric inequalities, was jointly supervised by Alessio Figalli and Francesco Maggi. In her dissertation, she also cites Maria Girardi of the University of South Carolina as a mentor who strongly influenced her choice to continue in mathematics.

After postdoctoral study at Northwestern University in Chicago and the Institute for Advanced Study in Princeton, New Jersey, she joined Carnegie Mellon University as a tenure-track Gregg Zeitlin Early Career Professor in 2021.

== Recognition ==
Neumayer is the 2024 recipient of the Sadosky Prize in analysis of the Association for Women in Mathematics, given "for outstanding contributions to calculus of variations, partial differential equations, and geometric analysis". She also received a National Science Foundation CAREER Award in 2024.
