= Svitlana Mayboroda =

Ukrainian mathematician

Svitlana Mayboroda (Ukrainian: Світлана Майборода; born 1981) is a Ukrainian mathematician who works as a professor of mathematics at the University of Minnesota and ETH Zurich, and is a Distinguished Visiting Professor at the Institute for Advanced Study.

== Research ==
Mayboroda's research concerns harmonic analysis geometric measure theory and partial differential equations, including boundary value problems for elliptic partial differential equations. In particular, her work has provided a new mathematical approach to Anderson localization, a phenomenon in physics in which waves are confined to a local region rather than propagating throughout a medium, and has enjoyed wide ranging applications in condensed matter physics, cold atoms systems, research and engineering of organic and nonorganic semiconductor materials and devices.

== Education and career ==
Mayboroda was born on June 2, 1981, in Kharkiv. She earned the Ukrainian equivalent of two master's degrees, one in finance and one in applied mathematics, from the University of Kharkiv in 2001, and completed her Ph.D. in 2005 from the University of Missouri under the supervision of Marius Mitrea. After visiting positions at the Australian National University, Ohio State University, and Brown University, she joined the Purdue University faculty in 2008, and moved to the University of Minnesota in 2011. In 2023, she joined the ETH Zurich faculty.

== Recognition ==
Mayboroda was a Sloan Research Fellow for 2010–2015. In 2013, she became the inaugural winner of the Sadosky Research Prize in Analysis of the Association for Women in Mathematics. In 2015 she was elected as a fellow of the American Mathematical Society. In 2016, she was awarded the first Northrop Professorship at the University of Minnesota. and in 2020 she became the McKnight Presidential Professor. She was an invited speaker at the 2018 International Congress of Mathematicians, speaking in the section on Analysis and Operator Algebras. She became the 2023 National Blavatnik Laureate in Physical Sciences & Engineering, given to an outstanding scientist under the age of 42. That same year, she was also elected to the European Academy of Sciences, and, together with Marcel Filoche, was awarded the Elias M. Stein Prize for New Perspectives in Analysis by the American Mathematical Society, AMS. In 2025, Mayboroda was elected to the German National Academy of Sciences Leopoldina for her contributions to mathematical analysis and partial differential equations. She is also an elected member of the Academia Europaea, recognizing her distinguished scholarship in mathematics . In the same year, she received the Blaise Pascal Medal in Mathematics from the European Academy of Sciences (EurASc), awarded for outstanding contributions to the theory of elliptic partial differential equations and spectral theory. Svitlana Mayboroda is the Director of the Simons Collaboration on Localisation of waves and the Simons Initiative on Geometry of Flows .
