= National University of Rosario =

Research public university in Rosario, Santa Fe, Argentina

Coordinates: 32°56′34″S 60°39′00″W

- Universidad Nacional de Rosario
- Motto: Confingere hominem cogitantem (Latin)
- Motto in English: Educating thoughtful people
- Type: Public
- Established: November 29, 1968; 57 years ago
- Founder: Juan Carlos Onganía
- Rector: Franco Bartolacci
- Academic staff: 6,500 (2008)
- Students: 96,745 (2018)
- Location: Rosario, Santa Fe Province, Argentina
- Campus: Urban
- Website: www.unr.edu.ar
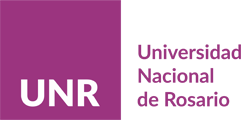

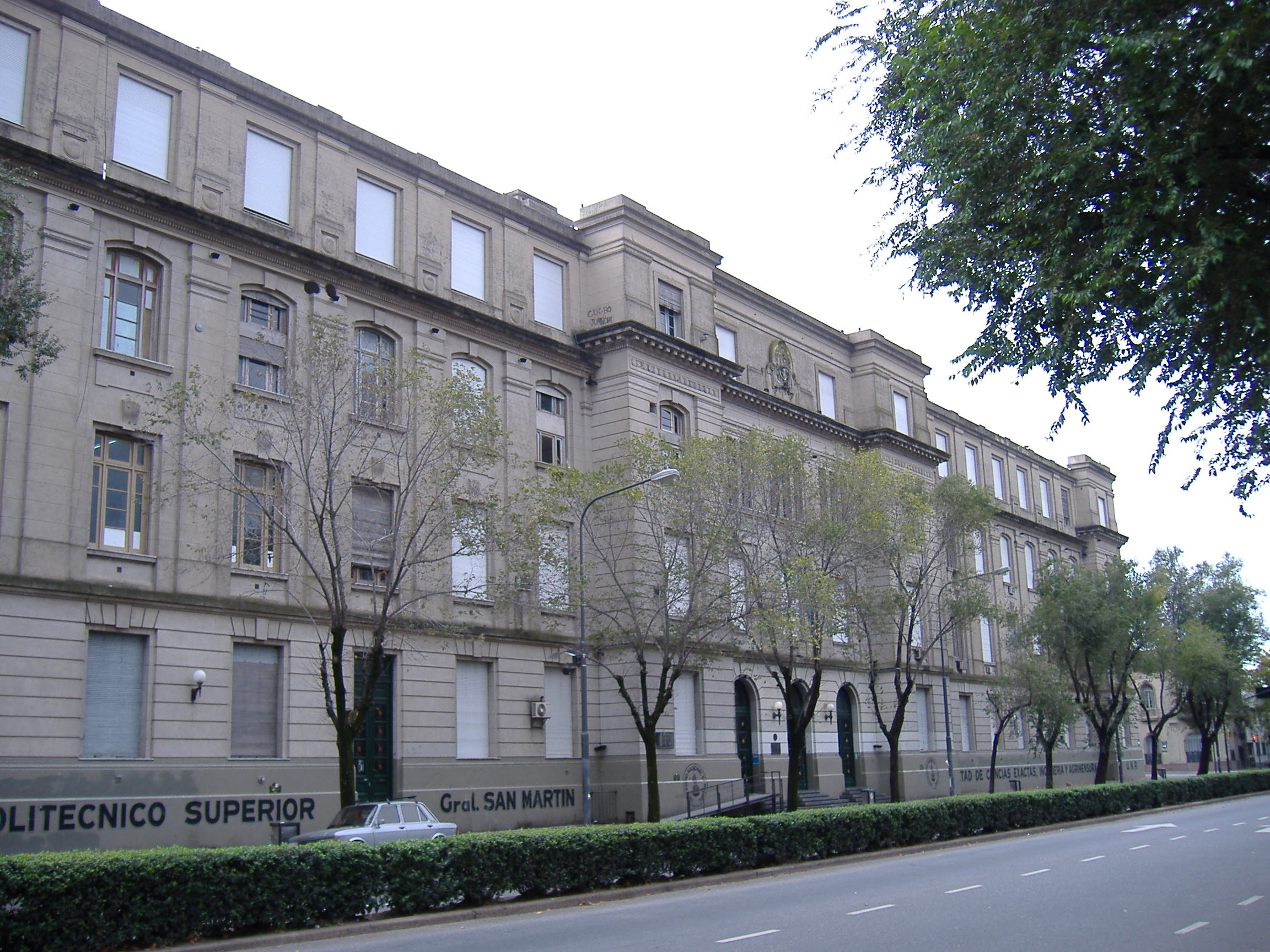
Faculty of Exact Sciences, Engineering and Surveying

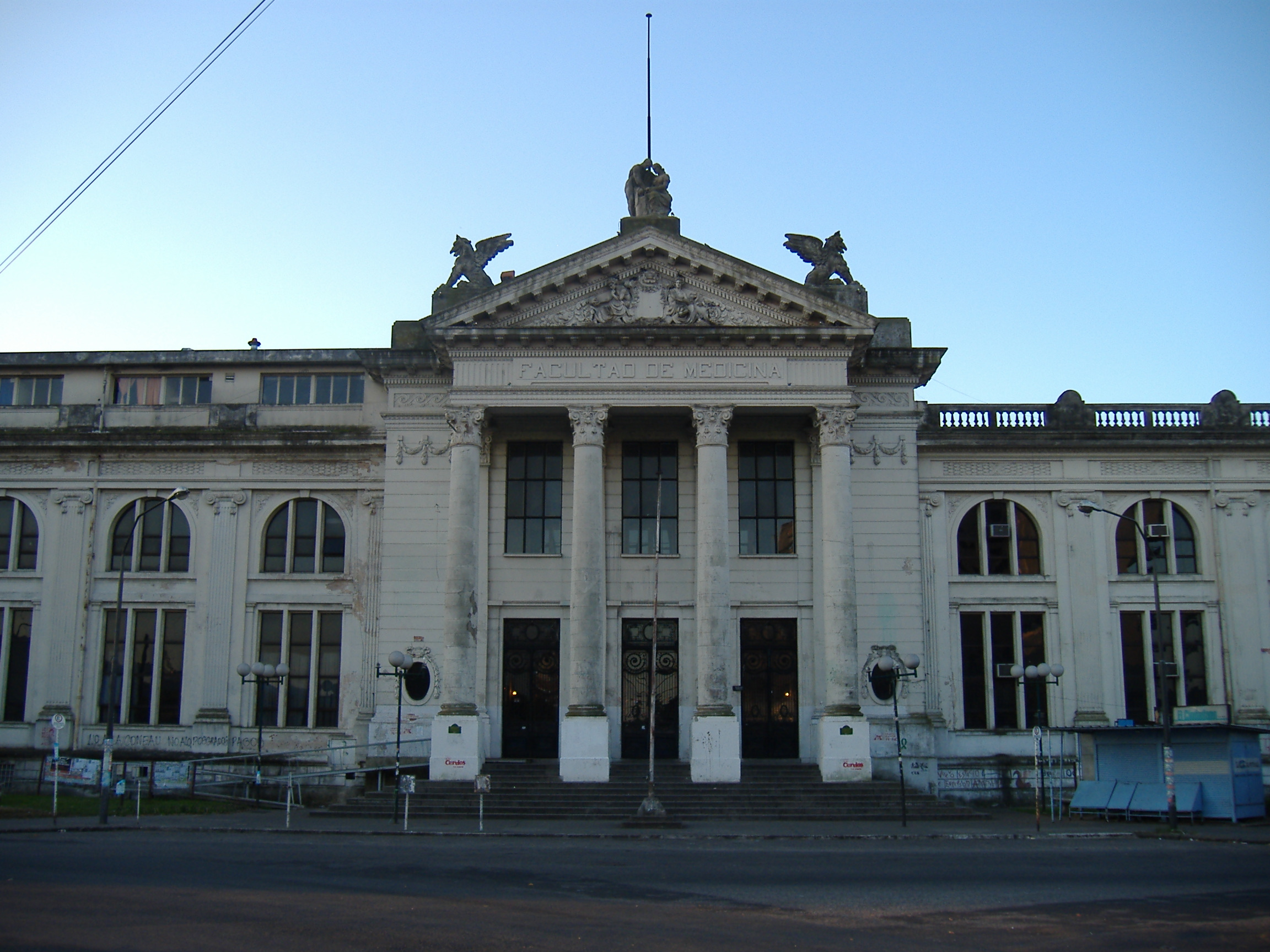
Faculty of Medicine

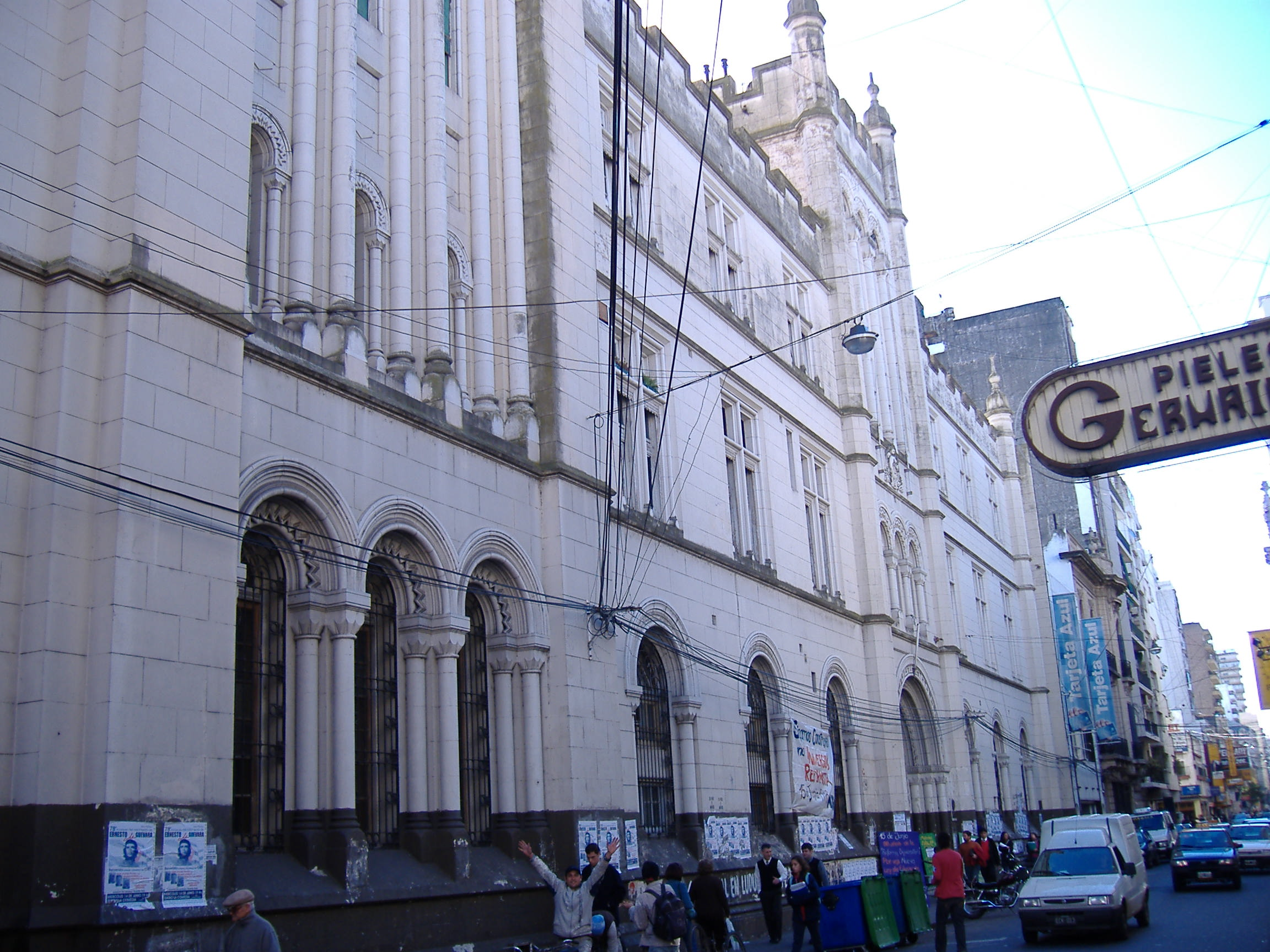
Faculty of Humanities and Arts

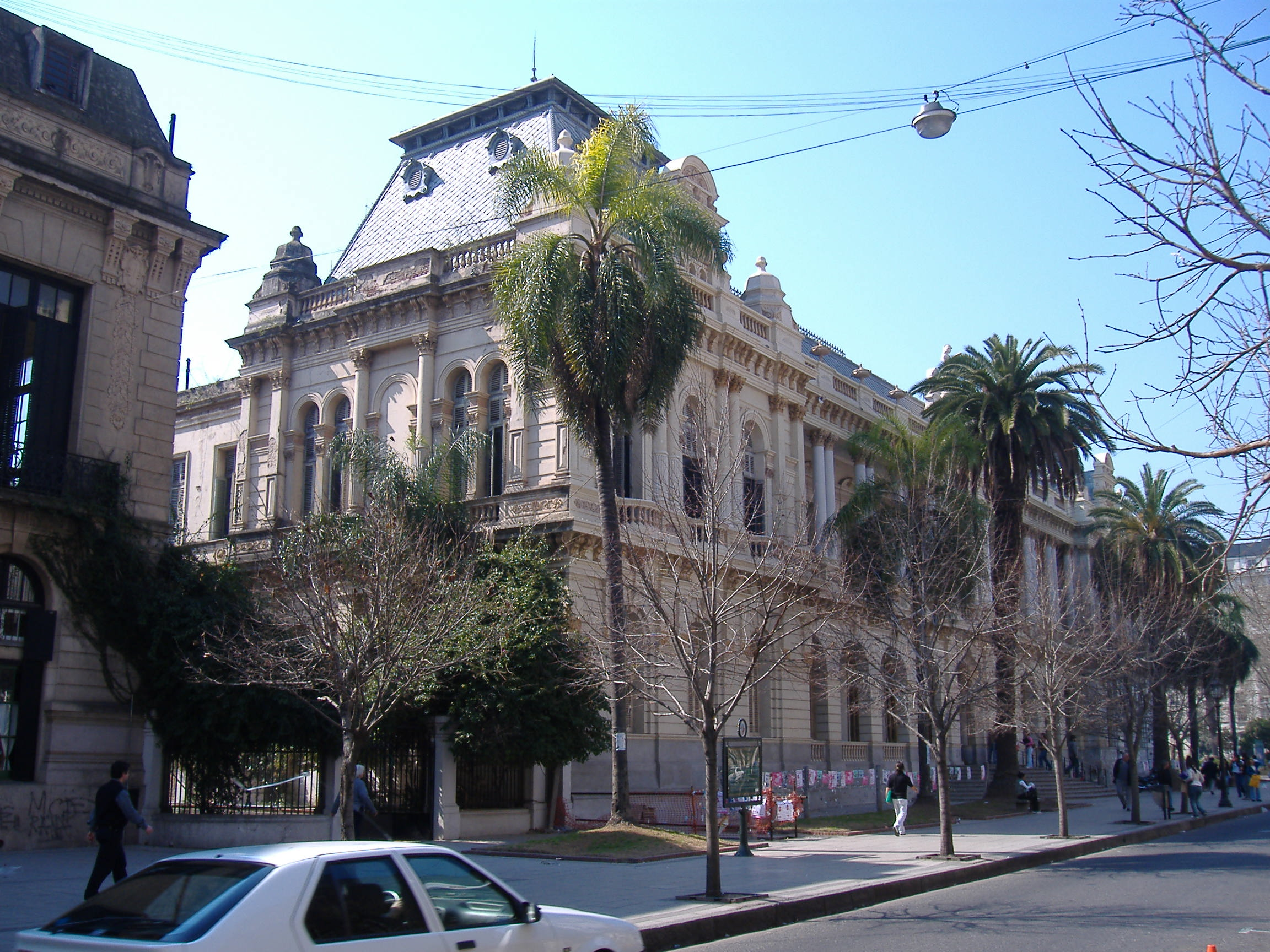
Faculty of Law

The National University of Rosario (Spanish: Universidad Nacional de Rosario, UNR) is a research public university in Rosario, Santa Fe, Argentina.

== Overview ==
Rosario National University (UNR) was created in 1968 by Law 17.987. Its foundational structure consisted of numerous academic and administrative entities belonging to the Rosario campus of the National University of the Littoral, established in 1918. The schools incorporated in the original university included the Colleges of Medicine, Biochemistry Sciences, Engineering, Architecture, Economic Sciences, Humanities and Arts, Law, Psychology, Political Sciences, Odontology, Agricultural Sciences, Veterinarian Sciences. Other institutions under the original university's aegis included hospitals and secondary schools, the Rosario Music Institute, the Fine Arts Institute, and the Center of Foreign and Modern Languages.

From its beginnings Rosario National University promoted an active relationship with Rosario society. This relationship allowed it to complete every initiated project and sustain growth in accordance to regional demands. Its present structure consists of 12 colleges, 3 high schools and one interdisciplinary academy. It has a building surface of 68,000 square meters (730,000 ft²), and offers 171 postgraduate courses, 63 college degrees, 15 technical degrees, 53 intermediate level college degrees, 26 degrees for articulation with the non-university higher education system, and 32 professional degrees (non university post-secondary degrees). An online campus was later incorporated, providing distance learning courses by using Web support as a teaching tool.

Rosario National University is committed to "providing higher education with scientific characteristics towards the formation of researchers, professionals and technicians with broad cultural integration, capable and conscious of their social responsibility, and with the duty of fostering interrelationships among faculty, graduates and students through national and international scientific and cultural centers."

== Academic units ==
- Facultad de Ciencias Exactas, Ingeniería y Agrimensura
  - Surveying
  - Civil Engineering
  - Electrical Engineering
  - Electronic Engineering
  - Industrial Engineering
  - Mechanical Engineering
  - Physics
  - Mathematics
  - Computer Science
  - Teacher of Mathematics
- Facultad de Ciencia Política y Relaciones Internacionales
  - Political Science
  - International Relations
  - Social Communication
  - Social Work
- Facultad de Ciencias Médicas
  - Medicine
  - Nursery
  - Phonaudiology
- Facultad de Ciencias Bioquímicas y Farmacéuticas
  - Biochemical
  - Pharmacy
  - Biotechnology
  - Chemistry
  - Teacher of Chemistry
- Facultad de Arquitectura, Planeamiento y Diseño
  - Architecture
- Facultad de Derecho
  - Law
  - Notary public
- Facultad de Odontología
  - Odontology
- Facultad de Ciencias Agrarias
  - Agronomy
- Facultad de Ciencias Veterinarias
  - Veterinary medicine
- Facultad de Ciencias Económicas y Estadística
  - Public Accountant
  - Administration
  - Economy
  - Statistic
  - Teacher of Accounting
  - Teacher of Economy
  - Teacher of Statistic
  - Logistics
- Facultad de Psicología
  - Psychology
  - Teacher of Psychology
- Facultad de Humanidades y Artes
  - Anthropology
  - Philosophy
  - History
  - Fine Arts
  - Spanish Language and Literature
  - Portuguese
  - Education Sciences
  - Musical Education
  - Instrumentation
  - Song
  - Composition
  - Teacher of Philosophy
  - Teacher of History
  - Teacher of Spanish Language and Literature
  - Teacher of Education Sciences
  - Teacher of Instrumentation
  - Teacher of Song
  - Teacher of Composition
  - Teacher of Music in Basic General Education
  - Teacher of Musical Education

== Preparatory schools ==
- Instituto Politécnico Superior "General San Martín"
- Escuela Superior de Comercio "Libertador General San Martín"
- Escuela Agrotécnica "Libertador Gral. San Martín"

== Notable faculty ==
- Beppo Levi (1875-1961) – mathematician
- Gregorio Baro (1928–2012) – chemist
- Eliseo Verón (1935–2014) – sociologist, anthropologist
- Delia Crovi Druetta – communications
- María Eugenia Bielsa (born 1958) – architect

== Notable alumni ==
- Hermes Binner (1943–2020) – physician and politician
- Rafael Bielsa (born 1953) – politician
- Miguel Lifschitz (1955–2001) – politician
- Rubén Giustiniani (born 1955) – politician
- Agustín Rossi (born 1959) – engineer and politician
- José Cura (born 1962) – tenor, conductor
- Jana Rodriguez Hertz (born 1970) – mathematician
- Federico Rodriguez Hertz (born 1973) – mathematician
- Luciano Marraffini (born 1974) – microbiologist
- Rachel Chan – biologist
- Alejandrina Cristia – linguist and research director
- Ana María Cué (born 1941) – pianist, poet, educator

== See also ==
- Science and technology in Argentina
- Argentine university reform of 1918
