= Cora Ratto de Sadosky =

Argentine mathematician and human rights activist

- Born: Corina Eloísa Ratto; January 3, 1912; Buenos Aires, Argentina
- Died: January 2, 1981 (aged 68); Barcelona, Spain
- Education: University of Buenos Aires
- Occupations: mathematician, activist, educator, author
- Spouse: Manuel Sadosky
- Children: Cora Sadosky (daughter)
- Parents: Livio Benito Ratto (father); Francisca Butta (mother)

Corina (Cora) Eloísa Ratto de Sadosky (a.k.a. Cora Ratto, 1912–1981) was an Argentine mathematician, educator and militant activist in support of human and women's rights in Argentina and beyond. She played an important part in the Argentine University Federation supporting republican interests during the Spanish Civil War and helping victims of Falangist oppression. In 1941, following the Nazi invasion of the Soviet Union, she established and headed the anti-fascist Junta de la Victoria which stood for democracy and women's suffrage. In 1965, Ratto founded Columna 10, a journal denouncing the conduct of the United States in the Vietnam War. In the 1970s, she published a series of important mathematics text books.

== Academic career ==
Born in Buenos Aires on 3 January 1912, Corina (Cora) Eloísa Ratto was the daughter of Livio Benito Ratto and Francisca Butta. Brought up in a middle-class family of Italian origin, in the 1930s she graduated in mathematics from the University of Buenos Aires. After Juan Perón had been overthrown, she was able to complete her doctorate under Mischa Cotlar in 1959 with her thesis Conditions of Continuity of Generalized Potential Operators with Hyperbolic Metric.

While a student in the 1930s, she played a major role in the Argentine student organization Federación Universitaria Argentina. She supported republican interests during the Spanish Civil War and helped victims of Falangist oppression. She denounced the Chaco War on the grounds that it had been triggered by British and American interests. In 1937, she married the mathematician Manuel Sadosky (1914–2005) with whom she had one child, Cora Sadosky (1940–2010), who also became a prominent mathematician and was president of the Association for Women in Mathematics in the mid-1990s.

After the Nazis invaded the Soviet Union in World War II, in the early 1940s Ratto established and headed the women's organization La Junta de la Victoria (The Victory Union) to promote democracy and provide support for the anti-Nazi war effort, including clothing and food for the Allies. By 1945, it had some 50,000 members, making it the first significant women's organization in South America. The organization also served to encourage its members to fight for votes for women.

After the war, the family moved to Europe where Ratto and her husband furthered their studies in France and Italy. Thereafter they returned to Argentina which was in political turmoil. Ratto worked in a commercial firm to sustain the family.

In 1956 universities in Argentina regained their academic autonomy. Ratto and her husband returned to join a team which built the modern school of science at the University of Buenos Aires.

In 1965, Ratto founded Columna 10, a journal denouncing the conduct of the United States in the Vietnam War. In the 1970s, she published a series of important mathematics text books in Spanish, including Introducción al álgebra: nociones de álgebra lineal (together with Misha Coltar) and Material formativo para docentes de matemática del nivel secundario.

Threatened by the anti-communist organization Alianza Anticomunista Argentina, Ratto left Argentina in 1974, first moving to Venezuela, then to Spain. She died in Barcelona on 2 January 1981.

On 6 November 2020, a satellite named after her (ÑuSat 11 or "Cora", COSPAR 2020-079C) was launched into space.

== Selected publications ==
- Mischa Cotlar, Cora Ratto de Sadosky, Introduction to algebra: notions of linear algebra. (1962). Editorial Universitaria de Buenos Aires, ed.
- Archimedes, Cora Ratto de Sadosky, El método (in Spanish) (1966). Buenos Aires: Eudeba.
