= Sadosky Prize =

Mathematics award

The AWM–Sadosky Prize in Analysis is a prize given every other year by the Association for Women in Mathematics to an outstanding young female researcher in mathematical analysis. It was established in 2012, and is named after Cora Sadosky, a mathematician specializing in analysis who became president of the AWM.

The winners have included:

- Svitlana Mayboroda (2014), for her research on "boundary value problems for second and higher order elliptic equations in non-smooth media".
- Daniela De Silva (2016), for "fundamental contributions to the regularity theory of nonlinear elliptic partial differential equations and non-local integro-differential equations".
- Lillian Pierce (2018), for research that "spans and connects a broad spectrum of problems ranging from character sums in number theory to singular integral operators in Euclidean spaces".
- Mihaela Ignatova (2020), "in recognition of her contributions to the analysis of partial differential equations, in particular in fluid mechanics".
- Yaiza Canzani (2022), "in recognition of outstanding contributions in spectral geometry and microlocal analysis".
- Robin Neumayer (2024), for "outstanding contributions to calculus of variations, partial differential equations, and geometric analysis".
- Hong Wang (2026), for "solving central problems in harmonic analysis through the introduction of ground-breaking ideas. In particular, for substantial contributions to the Fourier restriction problem, the Kakeya conjecture, and geometric measure theory".

== See also ==
- List of awards honoring women
- List of mathematics awards
