= Yaiza Canzani =

Spanish and Uruguayan mathematician

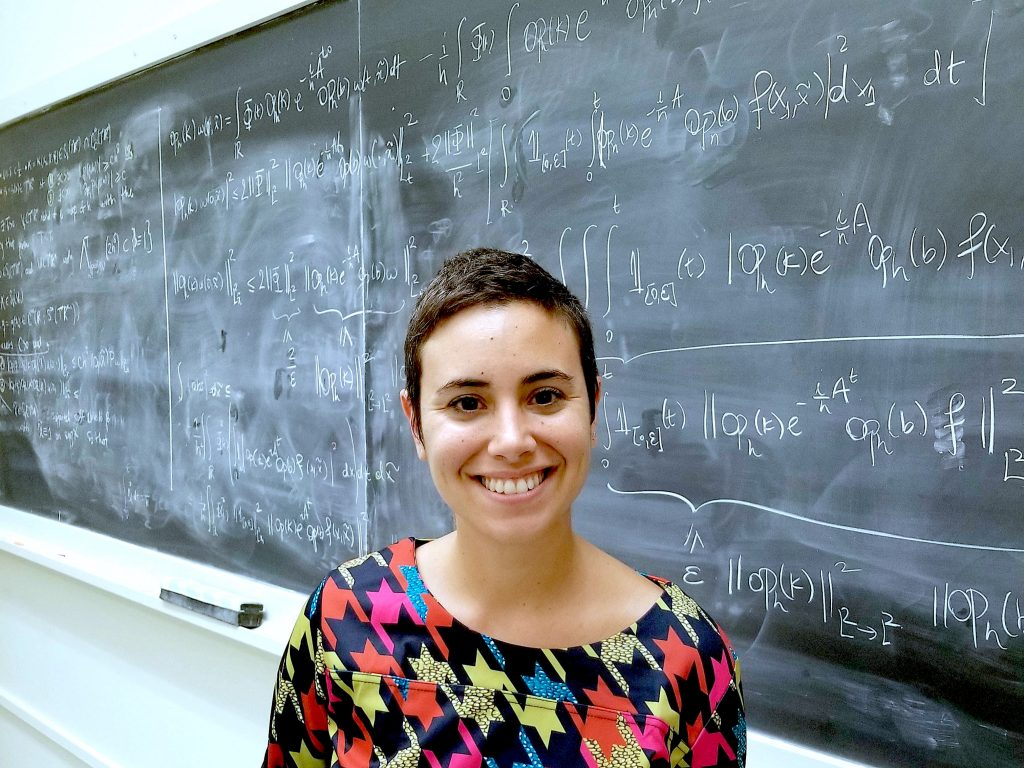
- Born: Spain
- Education: McGill University
- Scientific career
- Fields: Mathematics
- Workplaces: University of North Carolina at Chapel Hill
- Doctoral advisor: Dmitry Jakobson, John Toth

Yaiza Canzani García is a Spanish and Uruguayan mathematician known for her work in mathematical analysis, and particularly in spectral geometry and microlocal analysis. She is an associate professor of mathematics at the University of North Carolina at Chapel Hill.

== Education and career ==
Canzani was born in Spain and grew up in Uruguay. She was an undergraduate at the University of the Republic (Uruguay), where she earned a bachelor's degree in mathematics in 2008. She completed a Ph.D. in 2013 at McGill University in Montreal, Canada, with the dissertation Spectral Geometry of Conformally Covariant Operators jointly supervised by Dmitry Jakobson and John Toth.

After postdoctoral study at the Institute for Advanced Study and as a Benjamin Peirce Fellow at Harvard University, she became an assistant professor of mathematics at the University of North Carolina at Chapel Hill in 2016. In 2021 she was promoted to associate professor.

== Recognition ==
Canzani is a recipient of a National Science Foundation CAREER Award and a Sloan Research Fellowship. She is the 2022 winner of the Sadosky Prize in analysis of the Association for Women in Mathematics. The award was given "in recognition of outstanding contributions in spectral geometry and microlocal analysis", citing her "breakthrough results on nodal sets, random waves, Weyl Laws, $L^p$-norms, and other problems on eigenfunctions and eigenvalues on Riemannian manifolds".

She was elected as a Fellow of the American Mathematical Society, in the 2025 class of fellows.
