= Cora Sadosky =

Argentine mathematician

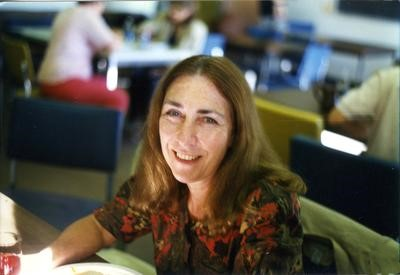
- Cora Sadosky in Berkeley, 1995
- Born: Cora Susana Sadosky; May 23, 1940; Buenos Aires, Argentina
- Died: December 3, 2010 (aged 70)
- Education: University of Chicago
- Spouse: Daniel J. Goldstein
- Scientific career
- Fields: Mathematics
- Workplaces: Howard University
- Doctoral advisors: Alberto Calderón, Antoni Zygmund

Cora Susana Sadosky de Goldstein (May 23, 1940 – December 3, 2010) was an Argentine mathematician and Professor of Mathematics at Howard University.

== Early life and education ==
Sadosky was born in Buenos Aires, Argentina, the daughter of mathematicians Manuel Sadosky and Corina Eloísa "Cora" Ratto de Sadosky. At the age of 6, she moved with her parents to France and Italy.

Sadosky began college at age 15 in the School of Science of the University of Buenos Aires, obtaining her degree of Licenciatura (comparable to a Bachelor's degree in the US nomenclature) in 1960. She earned her doctorate at the University of Chicago in 1965.

== Career ==
After receiving her doctorate, she returned to Argentina. She became an assistant professor of Mathematics at the University of Buenos Aires. She resigned her position in 1966, along with 400 other faculty members, in protest over a police assault on the School of Science. She taught for one semester at Uruguay National University and then became an assistant professor at Johns Hopkins. She returned to Argentina in 1968 but was unable to obtain an academic position there, instead working as a technical translator and editor.

In 1974, due to political persecution, Sadosky left Argentina, relocating to Caracas to join the faculty of the Central University of Venezuela. At this time she wrote a graduate text on mathematics, Interpolation of Operators and Singular Integrals: An Introduction to Harmonic Analysis, which was published in the United States in 1979. She spent the academic year of 1978–1979 at the Institute for Advanced Study in Princeton, New Jersey. In 1980 she became an associate professor at Howard University. After spending a year as a visiting professor at the University of Buenos Aires, she returned to Howard University as a full professor in 1985. From 1995 to 1997, she served as an American Mathematical Society Council member at large.

== Awards ==
She was appointed a visiting professorship for women (VPW) in science and technology from the National Science Foundation (NSF) for 1983–1984 and spent it at the Institute for Advanced Study. She received a second VPW in 1995 which she spent as visiting professor at the University of California at Berkeley. She received a Career Advancement Award from the NSF in 1987–1988 which allowed her to spend the year as a member of the classical analysis program at Mathematical Sciences Research Institute (MSRI), where she later returned as a research professor.

She was elected president of the Association for Women in Mathematics (AWM) for 1993–1995. The Sadosky Prize of the AWM is named in her honor.

== Research ==
Sadosky's research was in the field of analysis, particularly Fourier analysis and Operator Theory. Sadosky's doctoral thesis was on parabolic singular integrals, written under Alberto Pedro Calderón and Antoni Zygmund.

Together with Mischa Cotlar, Sadosky wrote more than 30 articles as part of a collaborative research program. Their research included work on moments theory and lifting theorems for measures, Toeplitz forms, Hankel operators, and scattering systems, as well as their applications using weighted norm inequalities and functions of bounded mean oscillation.

In addition to the above topics, Sadosky wrote extensively on harmonic analysis, particularly harmonic analysis on Euclidean space, the Hilbert transform, and other topics related to scattering and lifting techniques.
