= Rachel Chan (biologist) =

Argentine scientist

- Born: Raquel Lía Chan
- Awards: Konex Award 2013 and 2023

Academic background
- Education: Hebrew University of Jerusalem Universidad Nacional de Rosario
- Doctoral advisor: R.H. Vallejos

Academic work
- Institutions: Universidad Nacional del Litoral, the National Research Council (Conicet), Agrobiotechnology Institute of Santa Fe
- Main interests: Biologist; Ecology; Evolutionary Biology
- Notable ideas: photosynthesis, environmental conditions

Rachel (Raquel) Chan is a pioneering Argentine biochemist from the Santa Fe Province in Argentina. Her work has centered on photosynthesis, and she has invented multiple drought-resistant seeds. She is the Director of the Agrobiotechnology Institute of Santa Fe (IAL). Chan was named one of the ten most outstanding women scientists in Latin America by the BBC.

== Education ==
Chan did her undergraduate study at the Hebrew University of Jerusalem. She received her Ph.D. degree in Biochemistry from the National University of Rosario, Argentina, in 1988.

== HB4 technology ==
In 2003, Raquel Chan and Daniel González, in collaboration with the company Bioceres, the National Scientific and Technical Research Council (CONICET) and the Universidad Nacional del Litoral (UNL), led the team that discovered the effect of tolerance to the drought of a sunflower gene called hahb-4.

The initial discovery allowed Bioceres to develop a specific project to generate new hahb-4 transformation events on Arabidopsis thaliana. The objective of the project was to evaluate different promoters and molecular constructions to be used later on crops of agronomic interest.

In the course of developing the technology a particular efficiency of the hahb-4 gene was identified. This new, modified version of the original gene provides a greater efficiency in drought conditions. The modified hahb-4 sunflower gene improves adaptation of the plant to the environment, which allows obtaining a higher yield of grain. HB4® is currently the world's only drought-tolerant GMO technology for wheat and soybean crops.

== Career ==
Chan holds positions at the National University of Litoral, the National Research Council (CONICET), and the Agrobiotechnology Institute of Santa Fe (IAL). The IAL researches biotechnology and plant molecular biology. Chan's research concentrates on photosynthesis. After returning to Argentina in 1992, she began a project to understand how plants are affected by environmental conditions. Chan's team of scientific researchers created more drought resistant seeds.

About her work Chan stated, "The creation of more drought-resistant seed was a very long process of basic research with research groups were changing over time. It was a day and Eureka! It was like the discovery of Newton when the apple fell"

Supporters of the technology say the boost in productivity could mean as much as $10 billion in added profits each year, particularly after a severe drought recently slashed Argentina's soy output by more than a third.

Chan continues to support the South American agricultural innovation, helping commercialize drought-resistant soybean seeds as recently as 2018.

She was granted the Konex Award Merit Diploma in 2013 and the Platinum Konex Award in 2023 for her work in Biotechnology.

== Patents ==
Chan holds two patents, both concerning photosynthetic processes that result in drought-resistant crops.

- US Patent US7674955B2, Lia Raquel Chan & Daniel Hector Gonzalez, "Modified Helianthus annuus transcription factor improves yield", published 2007-08-02, issued 2015-05-19, assigned to BIOCERES S.A.
- US Patent US9035132B2, Lia Raquel Chan & Daniel Hector Gonzalez, "Transcription factor gene induced by water deficit conditions and abscisic acid from Helianthus annuus, promoter and transgenic plants", published 2007-08-02, issued 2010-03-09, assigned to BIOCERES S.A.
