= Manuel Sadosky =

Argentine mathematician and author

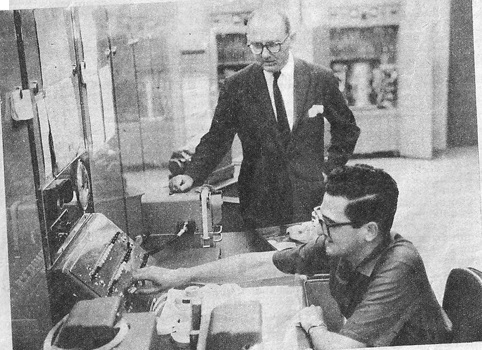
- Manuel Sadosky and the computer Clementina
- Born: April 13, 1914; Buenos Aires, Argentina
- Died: June 18, 2005 (aged 91); Buenos Aires, Argentina
- Occupation: mathematician
- Spouse: Corina (Cora) Eloísa Ratto
- Children: Cora Sadosky (daughter)

Manuel Sadosky (April 13, 1914 – June 18, 2005) was an Argentine mathematician, civil servant and author who was born in Buenos Aires to Jewish Russian immigrants who had fled the pogroms in Europe.

== Biography ==
Son of a shoemaker, Natalio Sadosky and his wife Maria Steingart of Ekaterinoslav (currently Dnipro), Ukraine, the family had arrived in Argentina in 1905.

Sadosky studied at the Mariano Acosta teachers school. Noted novelist Julio Cortázar was his classmate there, and remained a longtime friend. Since his childhood he was an ardent supporter of San Lorenzo de Almagro. He married fellow mathematician and activist Cora Ratto de Sadosky (1912–1981) in 1937. Biographer Pablo Jacovkis has said that Cora had a "powerful personality [that] was not overshadowed by her husband's." The couple had one child, mathematician Cora Sadosky (1940–2010).

=== Education ===
Sadosky graduated as a Doctor in Physics and Mathematics at the University of Buenos Aires in 1940, under supervision of Esteban Terradas. He then moved to the Henri Poincaré Institute in Paris to pursue postdoctoral studies on a scholarship granted by the French Government. After another year in Italy, he returned to Argentina, where he faced complicated employment options because of his opposition to the Peronist regime.

After a coup d'état of 1955 removed President Juan Perón from office, Sadosky took up a position as professor at the University of Buenos Aires, where he was vice-dean of the Faculty of Exact and Natural Sciences from 1957 to 1966.

=== Computational Institute ===
In 1960 he was commissioned to develop the Computational Institute (Instituto de Cálculo) of the university, home of Clementina, a new Ferranti Mercury computer and the first one installed in Argentina for research and education. His staff there included several excellent mathematicians including Cecilia Berdichevsky and Rebeca Cherep de Guber, and both would work closely with him for many years to come.

He directed the institute until another coup d'état installed a military dictatorship in 1966, causing him to resign with the rest of the faculty in opposition to government intervention in the hitherto autonomous state universities (the Night of the Long Batons) and flee the country.

=== In exile ===
He was later able to return to Argentina, but the Argentine Anticommunist Alliance death squad threatened to kill him so he fled with his family in 1974. He moved to Uruguay, finding employment in Montevideo at the Universidad de la República, where he continued publishing, helped to initiate computer studies and introduced the first research computer in that country.

In 1974, due to political persecution, Sadosky left Argentina with his family, relocating to Caracas to join the Science faculty of the Central University of Venezuela.

With the eventual return of democracy to Argentina in 1983, president Raúl Alfonsín appointed him as Secretary of State of Science and Technology (until 1989).

One of his major contributions to computer science during this period, was the creation of the ESLAI (Latin American School of Higher Informatics).

=== Later years ===
Dr. Manuel Sadosky died in Buenos Aires on June 18, 2005.

He was named an Illustrious Citizen of the City of Buenos Aires.

The Computer Science Department of the Faculty of Exact and Natural Sciences at the University of Buenos Aires is named after him.

== Selected publications ==
- Sadosky, Manuel, Cálculo numérico y gráfico, Buenos Aires: Ediciones Libreria del Colegio, 1952
- Sadosky, Manuel, Marx, hombre y revolucionario, Montevideo Libros de la pupila, 1969
- Sadosky, Manuel, Catalogo colectivo de publicaciones periodicas en las bibliotecas universitarias del Uruguay, Montevideo : Universidad de la Republica, 1972.
- Sadosky, Manuel; Sadosky, Cora, Complementos teóricos de los Elementos de calculo diferencial e integral de Manuel Sadosky, Rebeca Ch. de Guber, Buenos Aires: Alsina, 1974.
- Sadosky, Manuel; Guber, Rebeca Ch de, Elementos de cálculo diferencial e integral, Buenos Aires: Alsina, 1982.
