= La Noche de los Bastones Largos =

1966 state violence Buenos Aires

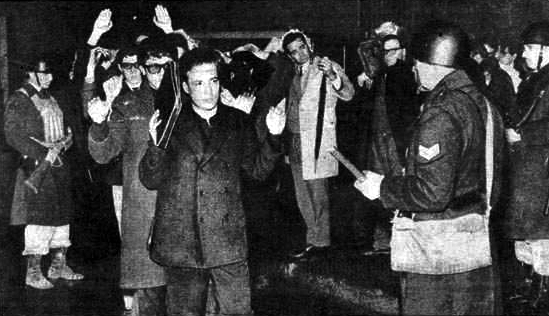
La Noche de los Bastones Largos; July 29, 1966

La Noche de los Bastones Largos ("The Night of the Long Batons") was the violent dislodging of students and teachers from five academic faculties of the University of Buenos Aires (UBA), by the Federal Argentine Police, on July 29, 1966. The academic faculties had been occupied by the students, professors, and graduates (the autonomous government of the university) who opposed the political intervention by the military government of General Juan Carlos Onganía to unilaterally revoke the academic freedom established in the 1918 university reform.

== Background ==
On June 28, 1966, a coup led by General Juan Carlos Onganía had overthrown elected president Arturo Illia and started the military government known as the Revolución Argentina.

The Argentine public universities were by then organised as dictated by the university reform, which established the autonomy of the university, and a political power divided in a tripartite government of students, professors and graduates.

The repression was particularly violent in the faculties of Exact and Natural Sciences and Philosophy and Literature of the UBA.

The Argentine Federal Police, which was under military control since June 28, 1966, had orders to repress victims harshly. The name given to the events refers to the long batons used by the police to hit students, professors and graduates while removing them from the buildings. 400 people were detained, with laboratories and libraries completely destroyed.

== Consequences ==
In the following months hundreds of professors were fired, resigned their positions, or abandoned the country.

In total, 301 university professors emigrated, of whom 215 were scientists, and 166 found their place in other Latin American universities, mainly in Chile and Venezuela. 94 moved to universities in the United States, Canada and Puerto Rico, and 41 fled to Europe.

In some cases, complete research teams were dismantled, such as the Instituto de Cálculo de Ciencias Exactas, where "Clementina", the first computer in Latin America, was functioning. All of its 70 members resigned and left the country. Similar cases were those of the Instituto de Psicología Evolutiva and the Instituto de Radiación Cósmica.

Some of the better known affected professors were:

- Sergio Bagú, historian and sociologist, one of the pioneers of the Theory of dependence. Exiled.
- Manuel Sadosky, pioneer of Computer Science in the country. Exiled.
- Gregorio Klimovsky, philosophy of science; one of the most important figures in logical mathematics and philosophy of science in the country.
- Pablo Miguel Jacovkis, mathematician, dean of the FCEyN, president of the CONICET (1999~2000).
- Rolando García, meteorology, worked with Jean Piaget. Exiled.
- Félix González Bonorino, most important geology scientist of the country.
- Tulio Halperín Donghi, among Latin America's most renowned historians.
- Risieri Frondizi, philosopher and ex-dean of the UBA.
- Sara Rietti, first nuclear chemist in Argentina.
- Juan G. Roederer, astronomer in charge of the Instituto de Radiación Cósmica.
- Catherine Cesarsky, world-wide known astronomer, since 2006 president of the International Astronomical Union.
- Telma Reca, psychologist, director of the Instituto de Psicología Evolutiva. Dismissed.
- Mariana Weissmann, physicist, receiver of the L'Oréal-Unesco award 2003, and first woman incorporated to the Academia Argentina de Ciencias Exactas, Físicas y Naturales. Exiled.

== Dismantling of the reformist university ==
With the intervention of the military government to the universities, a strict censorship was applied to the contents of the programs, and the scientific project of tight relationship between education and investigation in the universities.

The act of the military government is considered a central reference of the cultural and academic decadence, and the brain drain in Argentina.

== Recognition and memory ==
In 2004 film director Tristán Bauer presented his documentary film La noche de los bastones largos: el futuro intervenido, based in the events of July 29, 1966.

In July 2005 the Federación Universitaria Argentina delivered recognition diplomas to the 70 professors who resigned in 1966 to their positions at the Faculty of Agronomy of the University of Buenos Aires.

== See also ==
- University Revolution
- List of universities in Argentina
- List of cases of police brutality in Argentina
- Night of the Long Knives

== Bibliography ==
- Morero, Sergio; Ariel Eidelman, Ariel; y Lichtman, Guido. La noche de los bastones largos, 2nd ed. Buenos Aires: Nuevohacer Grupo Editor Latinoamericana, 2002. Collection: Colección Temas. ISBN 950-694-684-1.
