= National University of the Littoral =

Argentine university

- Universidad Nacional del Litoral
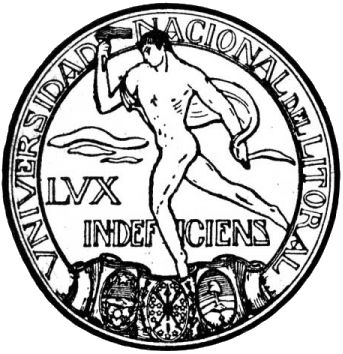
- Former names: Universidad Provincial de Santa Fe (Provincial University of Santa Fe)
- Motto: Lux indeficiens
- Motto in English: Inextinguishable light
- Type: Public
- Established: October 17, 1919
- Rector: Dr. Enrique José Mammarella
- Academic staff: 4,753
- Students: 35,265
- Location: Santa Fe, Santa Fe Province, Argentina; 31°38′04″S 60°42′19″W
- Colors: Clean river blue and white
- Website: unl.edu.ar
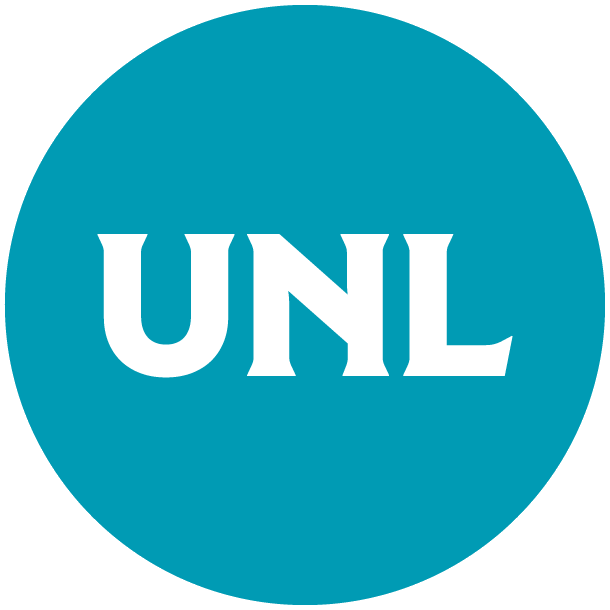

The National University of the Littoral (Spanish: Universidad Nacional del Litoral, UNL) is a public university in Argentina. It is based in Santa Fe, the capital of Santa Fe Province. It has colleges and other academic facilities in Esperanza, Reconquista and Gálvez, also in Santa Fe Province.

== History ==
The original institution was established as the Universidad Provincial de Santa Fe (Provincial University of Santa Fe) in 1889. The Argentine university reform of 1918 brought modernization and democratization to higher education in Argentina. The National University of the Littoral was created the following year by a national law signed on October 17, becoming the first regional university in the country, with influence over the Argentine Littoral (Santa Fe and the Mesopotamic provinces of Entre Ríos and Corrientes).

== Notable alumni ==
- Jorge Goldenberg - San Martín, Buenos Aires. Screenwriter.
- Juan José Saer - Serodino. Novelist.
- Miguel Brascó - Sastre, Santa Fe. Writer, humorist, critic.
- Alberto Cassano - Carmen de Patagones. Engineer, professor. Founded the scientific program CONICET.
- Alejandra Ironici - Santa Fe. Transgender activist. First person to legally change their gender on their national identity card.
- Eugenio Raúl Zaffaroni - Buenos Aires. Judge of Inter-American Court of Human Rights.
- Ricardo Lorenzetti - Rafaela. Judge. President of Supreme Court of Argentina.
- Horacio Rossatti - Santa Fe, Argentina. Lawyer. Former Mayor of the City of Santa Fé. Currently, President of the Supreme Court of Argentina.
- Rogelio Pfirter - Santa Fe, Argentina. Diplomat. OPAQ director 2002–2010.
- Jorge Faurie - Santa Fe, Argentina. Diplomat. Former chancellor at the Ministry of Foreign Affairs and Worship.

=== Governors ===
- Floro Bogado - Formosa. Governor Formosa Province 1983-1987
- Luis Beder Herrera - Campanas. Governor La Rioja Province (Argentina) 2007-2015
- Deolindo Bittel - Villa Ángela. Governor Chaco Province 1963-1966 and 1973-1976
- Ángel Rozas - General Pinedo. Governor Chaco Province 1995-2003
- José Antonio Romero Feris - Corrientes. Governor Corrientes Province 1983-1987
- Enrique Mosca - Santa Fe. Governor Santa Fe Province 1920-1924
- Waldino Suárez - Santa Fe. Governor Santa Fe Province 1946-1949
- Aldo Tessio - Esperanza, Santa Fe. Governor Santa Fe Province 1963-1966
- Jorge Obeid - Diamante, Entre Ríos. Governor Santa Fe Province 1995-1999 y 2003-2007
- Carlos Raúl Contín - Nogoyá. Governor Entre Ríos Province 1963-1966
- Sergio Montiel - Concepción del Uruguay. Governor Entre Ríos Province 1983-1987 y 1999-2003
- Oscar Castillo - San Fernando del Valle de Catamarca. Governor Catamarca Province 1999-2003
- Francisco Pérez (governor) - San Salvador de Jujuy. Governor Mendoza Province 2011-2015
- José Humberto Martiarena - San Salvador de Jujuy. Governor Jujuy Province 1966-1966
- Carlos Maestro - Puerto San Julián. Governor Chubut Province 1991-1999
- Arturo Puricelli - Río Gallegos. Governor Santa Cruz Province 1983-1987
- Rosana Bertone - San Salvador, Entre Ríos. Governor Tierra del Fuego Province 2015-2019

== Notable faculty ==
- Ángela Romera Vera - Legal scholar and Sociology chair. First Argentine woman diplomat.
- Raquel Chan. Biochemist, lead researcher in the team that developed the drought tolerant wheat and soybean seeds HB4®.

== See also ==
- List of universities in Argentina
