= History of Argentina =

The history of Argentina can be divided into four main parts: the pre-Columbian time or early history (up to the sixteenth century), the colonial period (1536–1809), the period of nation-building (1810–1880), and the history of modern Argentina (from around 1880).

Prehistory in the present territory of Argentina began with the first human settlements on the southern tip of Patagonia around 13,000 years ago.

Written history began with the arrival of Spanish chroniclers in the expedition of Juan Díaz de Solís in 1516 to the Río de la Plata, which marks the beginning of Spanish occupation of this region.

In 1776, the Spanish Crown established the Viceroyalty of the Río de la Plata, an umbrella of territories from which, with the Revolution of May 1810, began a process of gradual formation of several independent states, including one called the United Provinces of the Río de la Plata. With the declaration of independence on 9 July 1816, and the military defeat of the Spanish Empire in 1824, a federal state was formed in 1853–1861, known today as the Argentine Republic.

== Pre-Columbian era ==
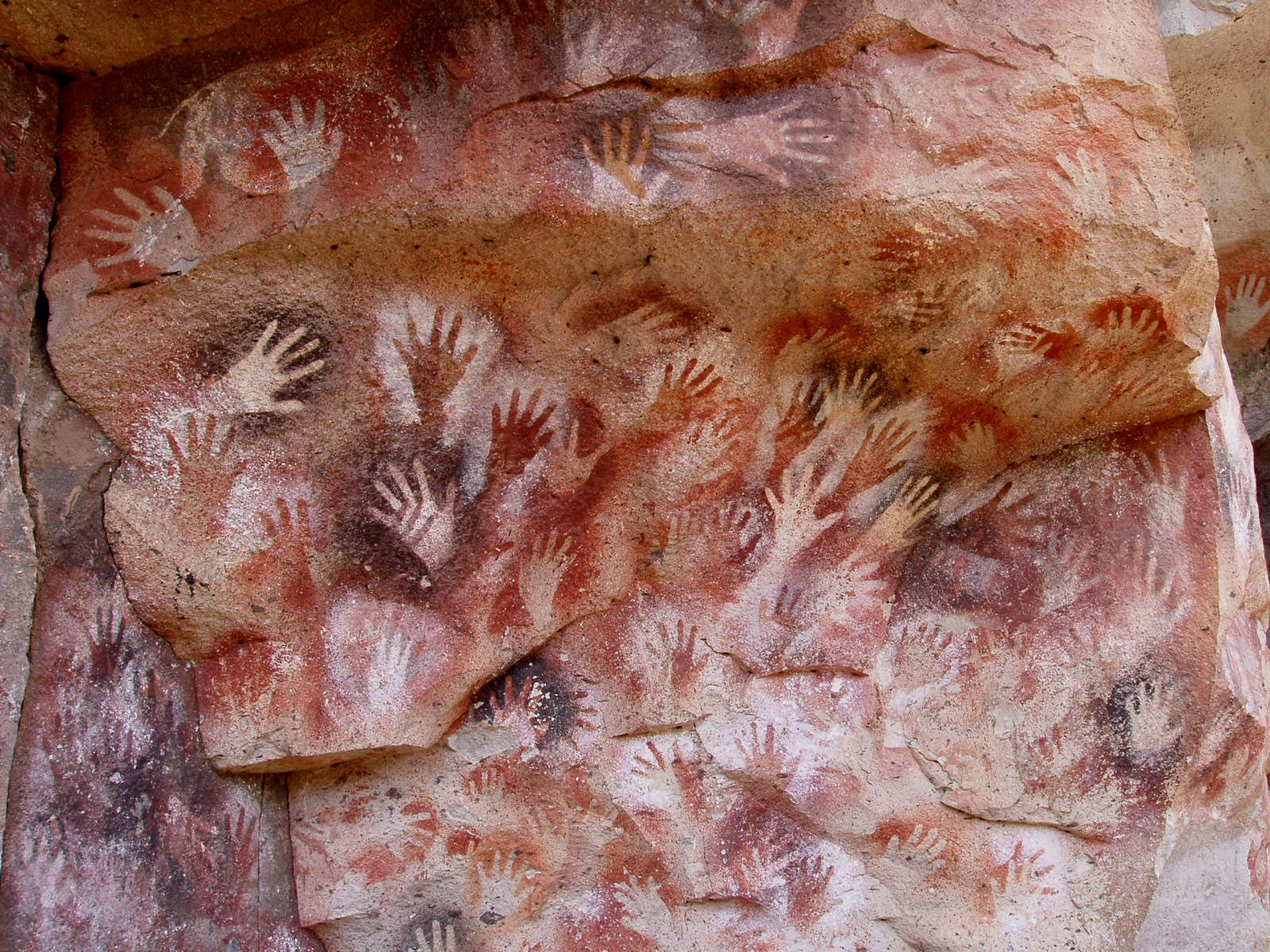
The Cave of the Hands in Santa Cruz

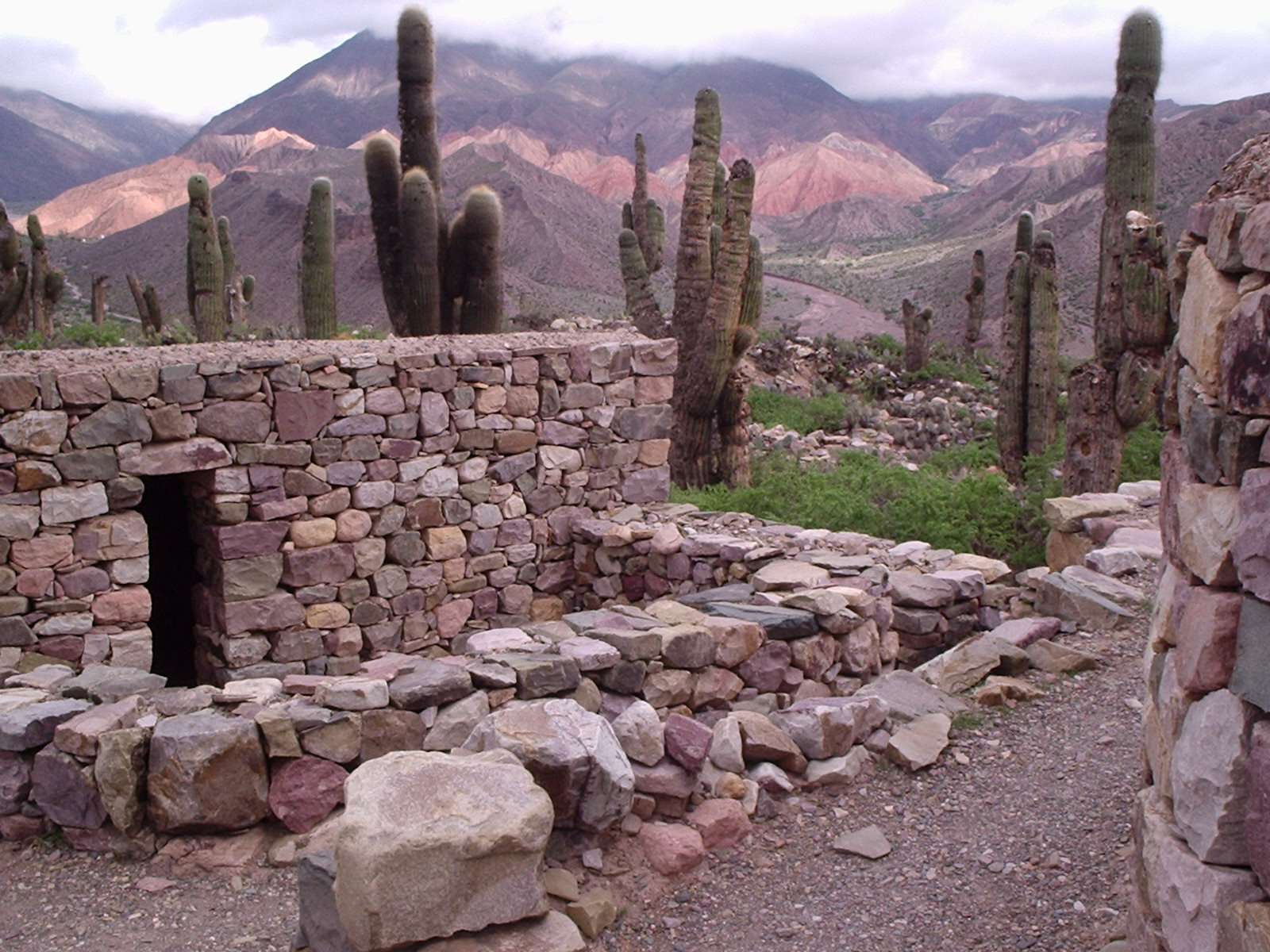
The fortification of Pucará de Tilcara in Jujuy Province, part of the Inca Empire

The area now known as Argentina was relatively sparsely populated until the period of European colonization. The earliest traces of human life are dated from the Paleolithic period, and there are further signs in the Mesolithic and Neolithic. However, large areas of the interior and Piedmont were apparently depopulated during an extensive dry period between 4000 and 2000 B.C.

The Uruguayan archaeologist Raúl Campá Soler divided the indigenous peoples in Argentina into three main groups: basic hunters and food gatherers, without the development of pottery; advanced gatherers and hunters; and basic farmers with pottery. The first group could be found in the Pampas and Patagonia, and the second one included the Charrúa and Minuane and the Guaraní.

In the late 15th century, the Native tribes of the Quebrada de Humahuaca were conquered by the Inca Empire, under Topa Inca Yupanqui, to secure the supply of metals such as silver, zinc, and copper. The Incan domination of the area lasted for about half a century and ended with the arrival of the Spanish in 1536.

Agriculture was practised in Pre-Hispanic Argentina as far south as southern Mendoza Province. Agriculture was at times practised beyond this limit in nearby areas of Patagonia but populations reverted at times to non-agricultural lifestyles. By the time of the Spanish arrival to the area (1550s) there is no record of agriculture being practised in northern Patagonia. The extensive Patagonian grasslands and their associated abundance of guanaco game may have contributed to the indigenous populations of the region favouring a hunter-gatherer lifestyle.

== Spanish colonial era (1516-1810) ==
Viceroyalty of Rio de la Plata in 1777

Europeans first arrived in the region with the 1502 Portuguese voyage of Gonçalo Coelho and Amerigo Vespucci. Around 1512, João de Lisboa and Estevão de Fróis discovered the Rio de La Plata in present-day Argentina, exploring its estuary, contacting the Charrúa people, and bringing the first news of the "people of the mountains", the Inca empire, obtained from the local natives. They also traveled as far south as the Gulf of San Matias at 42ºS, on the northern shores of Patagonia. The Spanish, led by Juan Díaz de Solís, visited the territory which is now Argentina in 1516. In 1536 Pedro de Mendoza established a small settlement at the modern location of Buenos Aires, which was abandoned in 1541.

From the north Diego de Almagro departed the newly conquered Inca capital of Cusco in 1535 and entered present-day Argentina from Tupiza in early 1536. The expedition of Diego de Almagro left Argentina as it crossed the Andes to Copiapó Valley in Chile in March-April 1536.

After the (failed) "First Foundation of Buenos Aires", a second one was established in 1580 by Juan de Garay, preceded by Córdoba foundation in 1573 by Jerónimo Luis de Cabrera. Those regions were part of the Viceroyalty of Peru, whose capital was Lima, and settlers arrived from that city. Unlike the other regions of South America, the colonization of the Río de la Plata estuary was not influenced by any gold rush, since it lacked any precious metals to mine.

The natural ports on the Río de la Plata estuary could not be used because all shipments were meant to be made through the port of Callao near Lima, a condition that led to contraband becoming the normal means of commerce in cities such as Asunción, Buenos Aires, and Montevideo.

The Spanish raised the status of this region by establishing the Viceroyalty of the Río de la Plata in 1776. This viceroyalty consisted of today's Argentina, Uruguay, and Paraguay, as well as much of present-day Bolivia. Buenos Aires, now holding the customs of the new political subdivision, became a flourishing port, as the revenues from the Potosí, the increasing maritime activity in terms of goods rather than precious metals, the production of cattle for the export of leather and other products, and other political reasons, made it gradually become one of the most important commercial centers of the region. Despite the money and political power that flowed into Buenos Aires, only the members of the viceregal court enjoyed things the general population could not. Buenos Aires was still in its developing stages, lacking full university degrees, career options, textiles, and self-reliance. Even the wealthiest families had bare furnishings and lacked basic household items, as their only Spanish ships came to Buenos Aires and items like fine china would be broken once they arrived.

The viceroyalty was, however, short-lived due to lack of internal cohesion among its many regions and lack of Spanish support. Ships from Spain became scarce again after the Spanish defeat at the battle of Trafalgar, that gave the British maritime supremacy. The British tried to invade Buenos Aires and Montevideo in 1806 and 1807, but were defeated both times by Santiago de Liniers. Those victories, achieved without help from mainland Spain, boosted the confidence of the city.

The beginning of the Peninsular War in Spain and the capture of the Spanish king Ferdinand VII created great concern all around the viceroyalty. It was thought that, without a King, people in America should rule themselves. This idea led to multiple attempts to remove the local authorities at Chuquisaca, La Paz, Montevideo and Buenos Aires, all of which were short-lived. A new successful attempt, the May Revolution of 1810, took place when it was reported that all of Spain, with the exception of Cádiz and León, had been conquered.

== War of Independence (1810-18) ==
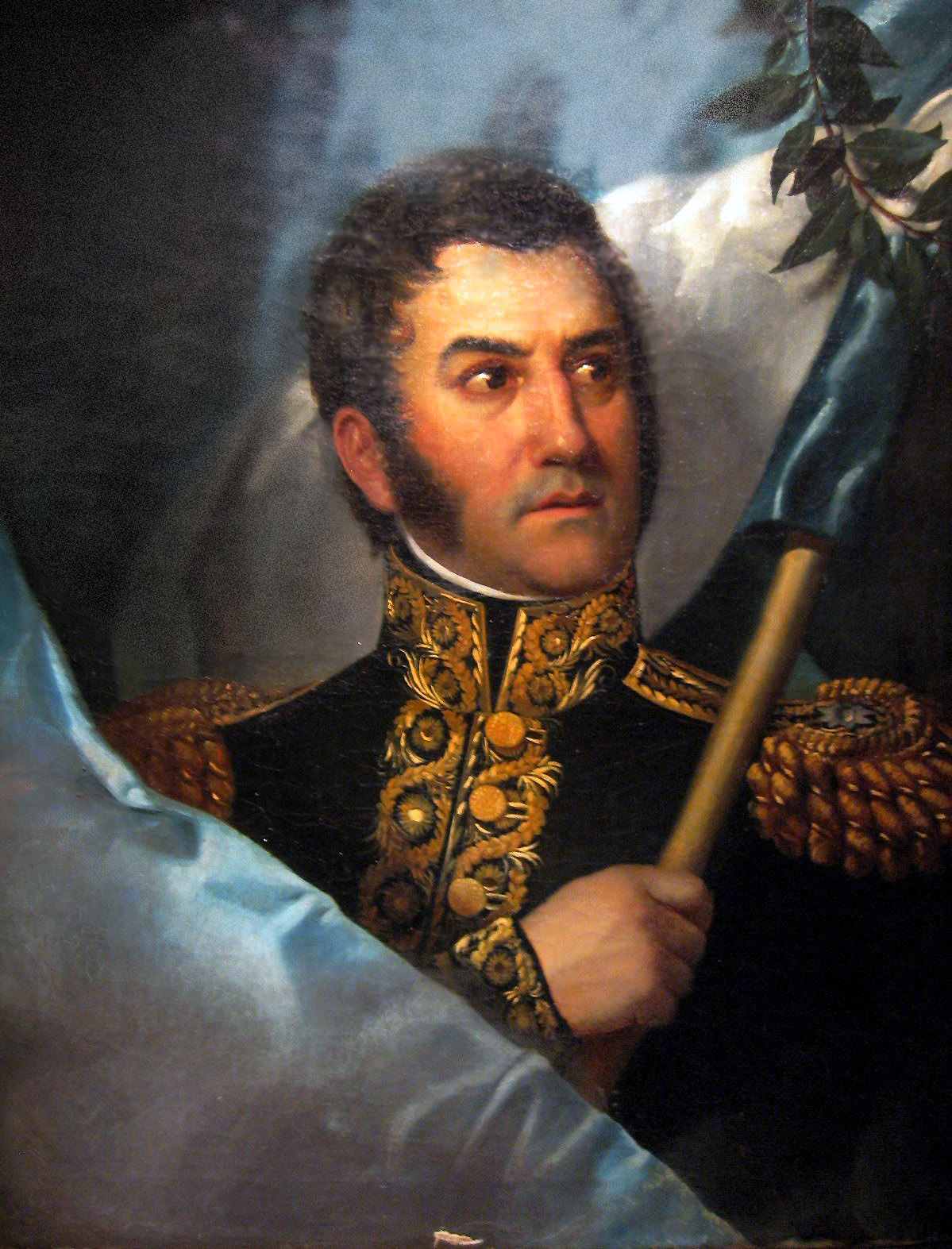
Portrait of José de San Martín

The May Revolution ousted the viceroy. Other forms of government, such as a constitutional monarchy or a Regency were briefly considered. The viceroyalty was also renamed, and it nominally became the United Provinces of the Río de la Plata. However, the status of the different territories that had belonged to the viceroyalty changed many times during the course of the war, as some regions would remain loyal to their previous governors and others were captured or recaptured; later these would split into several countries.

The first military campaigns against the royalists were waged by Manuel Belgrano and Juan José Castelli. The Primera Junta, after expanding to become the Junta Grande, was replaced by the First Triumvirate. A Second Triumvirate would replace it years later, calling for the Assembly of year XIII that was meant to declare independence and write a constitution. However, it did not do either, and replaced the triumvirates with a single head of state office, the Supreme Director.

By this time José de San Martín arrived in Buenos Aires with other generals of the Peninsular War. They gave new strength to the Revolutionary war, which was marked by the defeat of Belgrano and Castelli and the royalist resistance at the Banda Oriental. Alvear took Montevideo, and San Martín started a military campaign that would span an important part of the Spanish territories in America. He created the Army of the Andes in Mendoza and, with the help of Bernardo O'Higgins and other Chileans, he made the Crossing of the Andes and liberated Chile. With the Chilean navy at his disposal, he moved to Peru, liberating that country as well. San Martín met Simón Bolívar at Guayaquil, and retired from action.

A new assembly, the Congress of Tucumán, was called while San Martín was preparing the crossing of the Andes. It finally declared independence from Spain or any other foreign power. Bolivia declared itself independent in 1825, and Uruguay was created in 1828 as a result of the Cisplatine War.

The French-Argentine Hippolyte Bouchard then brought his fleet to wage war against Spain overseas and attacked Spanish California, Spanish Chile, Spanish Peru and Spanish Philippines. He secured the allegiance of escaped Filipinos in San Blas who defected from the Spanish to join the Argentine navy, due to common Argentine and Philippine grievances against Spanish colonization. At a later date, the Argentine Sun of May was adopted as a symbol by the Filipinos in the Philippine Revolution against Spain. Bouchard also secured the diplomatic recognition of Argentina from King Kamehameha I of the Kingdom of Hawaii. Historian Pacho O'Donnell affirms that Hawaii was the first state that recognized Argentina's independence. During the Argentine War of independence, Juan Fermín de San Martín, brother of Jose de San Martin, was already in the Philippines and drumming up revolutionary fervor.

The United Kingdom officially recognized Argentine independence in 1825, with the signing of a Treaty of Friendship, Commerce, and Navigation on 2 February; the British chargé d'affaires in Buenos Aires, Woodbine Parish, signed on behalf of his country. Spanish recognition of Argentine independence was not to come for several decades.

== Historical map ==
The map below is based on a wide range of antique maps for the periods shown and is intended to give a broad idea of the changes in the State of Argentina in the nineteenth century. The periods are broad and plus or minus about a decade around each date. The hatched areas are disputed or subject to change during the period, the text in this article will explain these changes. There are minor changes of territory that are not shown on the map.

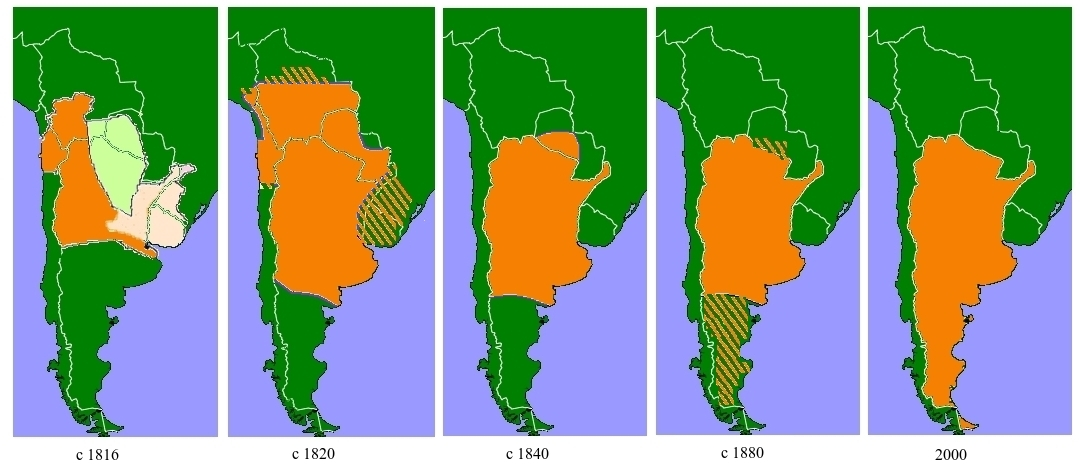
The changing state of Argentina. The light green area was allocated to indigenous peoples, the light pink area was the Liga Federal, the hatched areas are subject to change during the period.

== Argentine Civil Wars ==
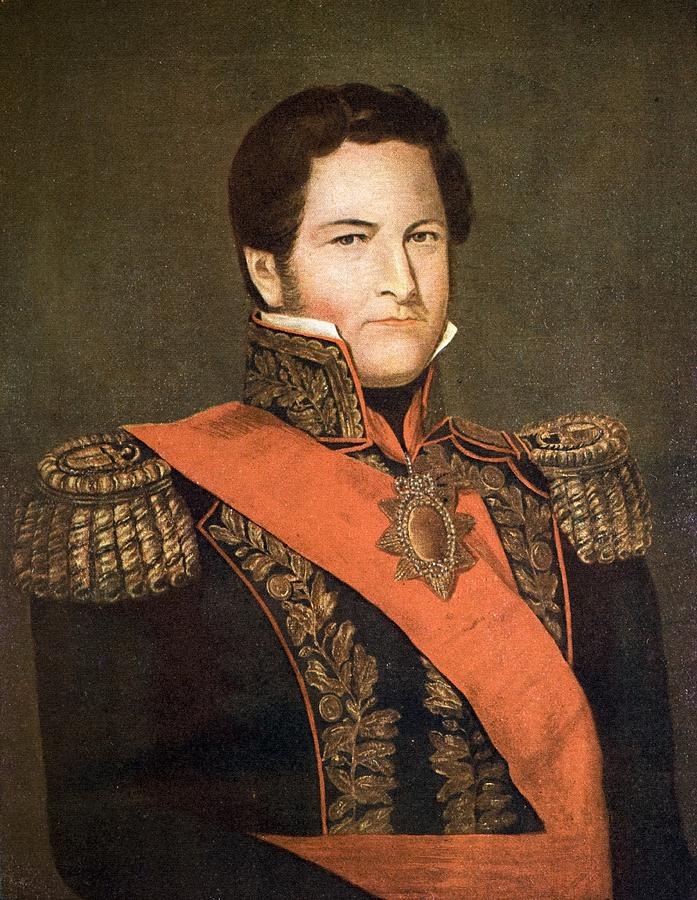
Governor Juan Manuel de Rosas by Cayetano Descalzi around 1841

The defeat of the Spanish was followed by a long civil war between unitarians and federalists, about the organization of the country and the role of Buenos Aires in it. Unitarians thought that Buenos Aires should lead the less-developed provinces, as the head of a strong centralized government. Federalists thought instead that the country should be a federation of autonomous provinces, like the United States. During this period, the government would kidnap protestors, and torture them for information.

During this period, the United Provinces of the Rio de la Plata lacked a head of state, since the unitarian defeat at the Battle of Cepeda had ended the authority of the Supreme Directors and the 1819 Constitution. There was a new attempt in 1826 to write a constitution. The Argentine executive which had originated with a Junta in 1810 during the War of Independence and which had given way to a Triumvirate in 1813 and a Directory in 1819 finally was transferred to a president in 1824 with Bernardino Rivadavia as the inaugural holder of the office. Rivadavia resigned due to the poor management at the Cisplatine War, and the 1826 constitution was repealed.

During this time, the Governors of Buenos Aires Province received the power to manage the international relations of the confederation, including war and debt payment. The dominant figure of this period was the federalist Juan Manuel de Rosas, who is portrayed from different angles by the diverse historiographic flows in Argentina: liberal history usually considers him a dictator, while revisionists support him on the grounds of his defense of national sovereignty.

He ruled the province of Buenos Aires from 1829 to 1852, facing military threats from secession attempts, neighboring countries, and even European nations. Rosas, as a Federalist, kept the customs receipts of Buenos Aires under the exclusive control of the city, whereas the other provinces expected to have a part of the revenue. Rosas considered this a fair measure because only Buenos Aires was paying the external debt generated by the Baring Brothers loan to Rivadavia, the war of independence and the war against Brazil. He developed a paramilitary force of his own, the Popular Restorer Society, commonly known as "Mazorca" ("Corncob").

Rosas' reluctance to call for a new assembly to write a constitution led General Justo José de Urquiza from Entre Ríos to turn against him. Urquiza defeated Rosas during the battle of Caseros and called for such an assembly. The Argentine Constitution of 1853 is, with amendments, still in force to this day. The Constitution was not immediately accepted by Buenos Aires, which seceded from the Confederation; it rejoined a few years later. In 1862 Bartolomé Mitre became the first president of the unified country.

== Liberal governments (1862–1880) ==
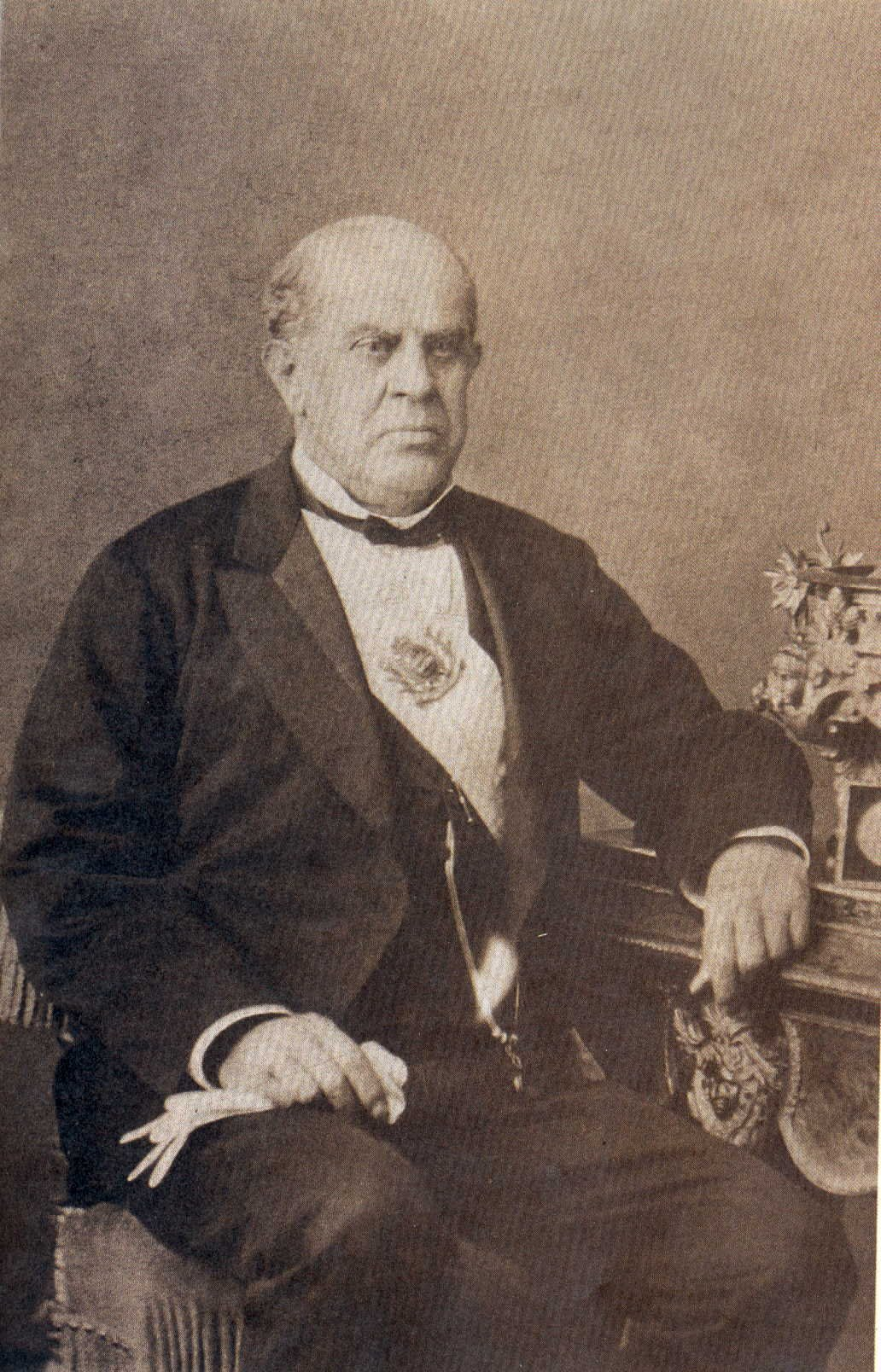
President Domingo Faustino Sarmiento

The presidency of Bartolomé Mitre saw an economic improvement in Argentina, with agricultural modernization, foreign investment, new railroads and ports and a wave of immigration from Europe. Mitre also stabilized the political system by commanding federal interventions that defeated the personal armies of caudillos Chacho Peñaloza and Juan Sáa. Argentina joined Uruguay and Brazil against Paraguay in the War of the Triple Alliance, which ended during Sarmiento's rule with the defeat of Paraguay and the annexation of part of its territory by Argentina.

Despite victory in the war, Mitre's popularity declined severely because a broad section of the Argentine population was opposed to the war due to the alliance with Brazil (Argentina's historic rival) that took place during the war, and the betrayal of Paraguay (which had been until then one of the country's most important economic allies). One of the major hallmarks of Mitre's presidency was the "Law of Compromise", in which Buenos Aires joined the Argentine Republic and allowed the government to use the City of Buenos Aires as the center of government, but without federalizing the city and by reserving the right of the province of Buenos Aires to secede from the nation if conflict arose.

In 1868 Mitre was succeeded by Domingo Faustino Sarmiento, who promoted public education, culture, telegraphs; as well as the modernization of the Army and the Navy. Sarmiento managed to defeat the last known caudillos and also dealt with the fallout of the Triple Alliance War, which included a decrease in national production due to the death of thousands of soldiers and an outbreak of diseases, such as cholera and yellow fever, brought by returning soldiers.

In 1874 Nicolás Avellaneda became president and ran into trouble when he had to deal with the economic depression left by the Panic of 1873. Most of these economic issues were solved when new land was opened for development after the expansion of national territory through the Conquest of the Desert, led by his war minister Julio Argentino Roca. This military campaign took most of the territories under the control of natives, and reduced their population.

In 1880 a trade conflict caused turmoil in Buenos Aires, which led governor Carlos Tejedor to declare secession from the republic. Avellaneda denied them this right, breaking the Law of Compromise, and proceeded to send army troops led by Roca to take over the province. Tejedor's secession efforts were defeated and Buenos Aires joined the republic definitively, federalizing the city of Buenos Aires and handing it over to the government as the nation's capital city.

== Conservative Republic (1880–1916) ==
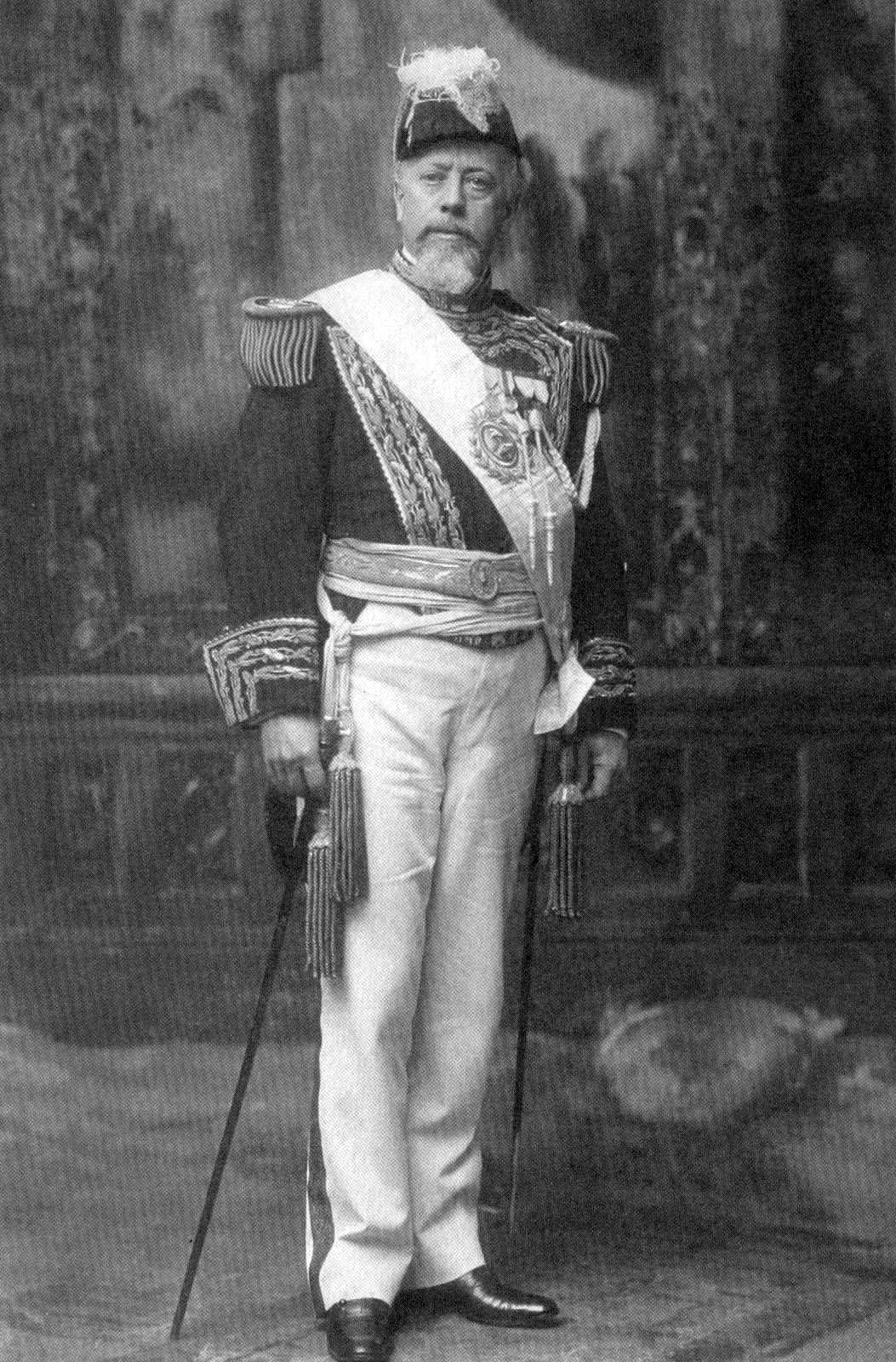
President Julio Argentino Roca, the central political figure of the PAN Hegemony years

After his surge in popularity due to his successful desert campaign, Julio Roca was elected president in 1880 as the candidate for the National Autonomist Party (Partido Autonomista Nacional – PAN), a party that would remain in power until 1916. During his presidency, Roca created a net of political alliances and installed several measures that helped him retain almost absolute control of the Argentine political scene throughout the 1880s. This keen ability with political strategy earned him his nickname of "The Fox".

The country's economy benefited from a change from extensive farming to industrial agriculture and a huge European immigration, but there wasn't yet a strong move towards industrialization. At that time, Argentina received some of the highest levels of foreign investment in Latin America, with the most of it coming from the British. In the midst of this economic expansion, the Law 1420 of Common Education of 1884 guaranteed universal, free, non-religious education to all children. This and other government policies were strongly opposed by the Roman Catholic Church in Argentina, causing the Holy See to break off diplomatic relations with the country for several years and setting the stage for decades of continued Church–state strain.

Map of the East Patagonia, Tierra del Fuego and Strait of Magellan Dispute. In blue and green are the boundaries claimed by Argentinian and Chilean historians respectably as uti possidetis iuris in Patagonia.

In the late 19th and early 20th century, Argentina temporarily resolved its border disputes with Chile with the Puna de Atacama dispute of 1899, the Boundary Treaty of 1881 between Chile and Argentina (which solved the East Patagonia, Tierra del Fuego and Strait of Magellan Dispute that existed from 1842) and the 1902 General Treaty of Arbitration. Roca's government and those that followed were aligned with the Argentine oligarchy, especially the great land owners.

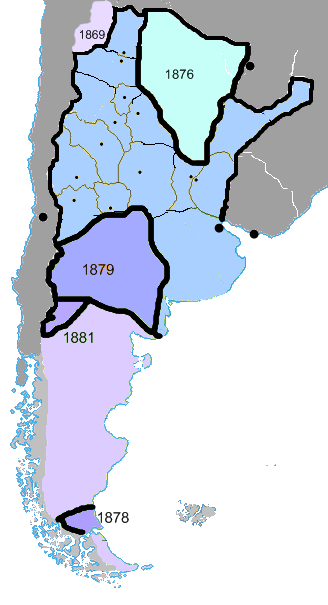
Under General Roca, the Conquest of the Desert extended Argentine power into Patagonia.

In 1886, Miguel Juárez Celman became president after Roca was constitutionally disqualified from re-election; Celman attempted to reduce Roca's control over the political scene, which earned him his predecessor's opposition. Roca led a great opposition movement against Celman, which coupled with the devastating effects that the Long Depression had on the Argentine economy, allowed the Civic opposition party to start a coup d'état which would be later known as the Revolution of the Park. The Revolution was led by the three main leaders of the Civic Union, Leandro Alem, former president Bartolomé Mitre and moderate socialist Juan B. Justo. Though it failed in its main goals, the revolution forced Juárez Celman's resignation and marked the decline of the Generation of '80.

In 1891, Roca proposed that the Civic Union elect someone to be vice-president to his own presidency the next time elections came around. One group led by Mitre decided to take the deal, while another more intransigent group led by Alem was opposed. This eventually led to the split of the Civic Union into the National Civic Union (Argentina), led by Mitre, and the Radical Civic Union, led by Alem. After this division occurred, Roca withdrew his offer, having completed his plan to divide the Civic Union and decrease their power. Alem would eventually commit suicide in 1896; control of the Radical Civic Union went to his nephew and protégé, Hipólito Yrigoyen.

After Celman's downfall, his vice-president Carlos Pellegrini took over and proceeded to resolve the economic crisis which afflicted the country, earning him the moniker of "The Storm Sailor". Fearing another wave of opposition from Roca like the one imposed on Celman, Pellegrini remained moderate in his presidency ending his predecessor's efforts to distance "The Fox" from political control. The following governments up until 1898 took similar measures and sided with Roca to avoid being politically chastised.

In 1898, Roca became president again in a politically unstable situation, with a large number of social conflicts that included massive strikes and anarchist subversion attempts. Roca handled most of these conflicts by having the police or the army crack down on protestors, rebels and suspected rebels. After the end of his second presidency, Roca fell ill and his role in political affairs began to decrease gradually until his death in late 1914.

In 1904, Alfredo Palacios, a member of Juan B. Justo's Socialist Party (founded in 1896), became the first Socialist deputy in Argentina, as a representative for the working-class neighborhood of La Boca in Buenos Aires. He helped create many laws, including the Ley Palacios against sexual exploitation, and others regulating child and woman labor, working hours and Sunday rest.

Unión Cívica Radical's 1893 and 1905 revolts, led by Hipólito Yrigoyen, inflicted fear among the oligarchy of an increased social instability and a possible revolution. Being a progressive member of the PAN, Roque Sáenz Peña recognized the need to satisfy the demand by public to maintain the existing regime. After being elected as president in 1910, he passed the Sáenz Peña Law in 1912 which made the political vote mandatory, secret and universal among males aged eighteen or more. His intention was not to allow the transition of power to Unión Cívica Radical but to increase public support for the PAN by enabling the universal electoral suffrage. However, the consequence was the opposite of what he intended to accomplish: the following election chose Hipólito Yrigoyen as the president in 1916, and it ended the hegemony of the PAN.

== Radical governments (1916–1930) ==
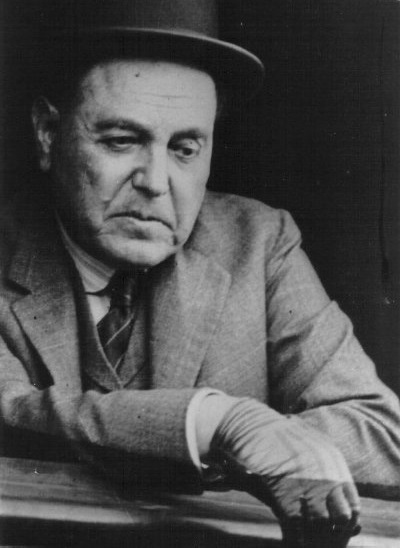
President Hipólito Yrigoyen

Conservative forces dominated Argentine politics until 1916, when the Radicals, led by Hipólito Yrigoyen, won control of the government through the first national elections under universal male suffrage. 745,000 citizens were allowed to vote, of a total population of 7.5 million (immigrants, who represented much of the population, were not allowed to vote); of these, 400,000 abstained.

Yrigoyen, however, only obtained 45% of the votes, which did not allow him a majority in Parliament, where the conservatives remained the leading force. Thus, of 80 draft laws proposed by the executive, only 26 were voted through by the conservative majority. A moderate agricultural reform proposal was rejected by Parliament, as was an income tax on interest, and the creation of a Bank of the Republic (which was to have the missions of the current Central Bank).

Meanwhile, the Radicals continued Argentina's neutrality policy during World War I, despite the United States urging them to declare war against the Central Powers. Neutrality enabled Argentina to export goods to Europe, in particular to Great Britain, as well as to issue credit to the belligerent powers. Germany sank two Argentine civilian ships, Monte Protegido on 4 April 1917, and the Toro, but the diplomatic incident ended only with the expulsion of the German ambassador, Karl von Luxburg. Yrigoyen organized a Conference of Neutral Powers in Buenos Aires, to oppose the United States' attempt to bring American states in the European war, and also supported Sandino's resistance in Nicaragua.

Despite conservative opposition, the Radical Civic Union (UCR), with their emphasis on fair elections and democratic institutions, opened their doors to Argentina's expanding middle class as well as to social groups previously excluded from power. Yrigoyen's policy was to "fix" the system, by enacting necessary reforms which would enable the agroindustrial export model to preserve itself. It alternated moderate social reforms with repression of the social movements. In 1918, a student movement started at the University of Córdoba, which eventually led to the University Reform, which quickly spread to the rest of Latin America. In May '68, French students recalled the Córdoba movement.

The Tragic Week of January 1919, during which the Argentine Regional Workers' Federation (FORA, founded in 1901) had called for a general strike after a police shooting, ended with 700 killed and 4,000 injured. General Luis Dellepiane marched on Buenos Aires to re-establish civil order. Despite being called on by some to initiate a coup against Yrigoyen, he remained loyal to the President, on the sole condition that the latter would allow him a free hand in the repression of the demonstrations. Social movements thereafter continued in the Forestal British company, and in Patagonia, where Hector Varela headed the military repression, assisted by the Argentine Patriotic League, killing 1,500.

On the other hand, Yrigoyen's administration enacted the Labor Code establishing the right to strike in 1921, implemented minimum wage laws and collective contracts. It also initiated the creation of the Dirección General de Yacimientos Petrolíferos Fiscales (YPF), the state oil company, in June 1922. Radicalism rejected class struggle and advocated social conciliation.

In September 1922, Yrigoyen's administration refused to follow the cordon sanitaire policy enacted against the Soviet Union, and, basing its policy on the assistance given to Austria after the war, decided to send to the USSR 5 million pesos in assistance.

The same year, Yrigoyen was replaced by his rival inside the UCR, Marcelo Torcuato de Alvear, an aristocrat, who defeated Norberto Piñero's Concentración Nacional (conservatives) with 458,457 votes to 200,080. Alvear brought to his cabinet personalities belonging to the traditional ruling classes, such as José Nicolás Matienzo at the Interior Ministry, Ángel Gallardo in Foreign Relations, Agustín P. Justo at the War Ministry, Manuel Domecq García at the Marine and Rafael Herrera Vegas at the Haciendas. Alvear's supporters founded the Unión Cívica Radical Antipersonalista, opposed to Yrigoyen's party.

During the early 1920s, the rise of the anarchist movement, fueled by the arrival of recent émigrés and deportees from Europe, spawned a new generation of left-wing activism in Argentina. The new left, mostly anarchists and anarcho-communists, rejected the incremental progressivism of the old Radical and Socialist elements in Argentina in favor of immediate action. The extremists, such as Severino Di Giovanni, openly espoused violence and 'propaganda by the deed'. A wave of bombings and shootouts with police culminated in an attempt to assassinate U.S. President Herbert Hoover on his visit to Argentina in 1928 and a nearly successful attempt to assassinate Yrigoyen in 1929 after he was re-elected to the presidency.

In 1921, the counter-revolutionary Logia General San Martín was founded, and diffused nationalist ideas in the military until its dissolution in 1926. Three years later, the Liga Republicana (Republican League) was founded by Roberto de Laferrère, on the model of Benito Mussolini's Blackshirts in Italy. The Argentine Right found its major influences in the 19th-century Spanish writer Marcelino Menéndez y Pelayo and in the French royalist Charles Maurras. Also in 1922, the poet Leopoldo Lugones, who had turned towards fascism, made a famous speech in Lima, known as "the time of the sword", in the presence of the War Minister and future dictator Agustín P. Justo, which called for a military coup and the establishment of a military dictatorship.

In 1928, Yrigoyen was re-elected as president and began a series of reforms to increase workers' rights. This intensified the conservative opposition against Yrigoyen, which grew even stronger after Argentina was devastated by the beginning of the Great Depression after the Wall Street crash. On 6 September 1930, a military coup led by the pro-fascist general José Félix Uriburu overthrew Yrigoyen's government and began a period in Argentine history known as the Infamous Decade.

During the Great Depression, exports of frozen beef, especially to Great Britain, provided much needed foreign currency, but trade fell off sharply.

== Infamous Decade (1930–1943) ==
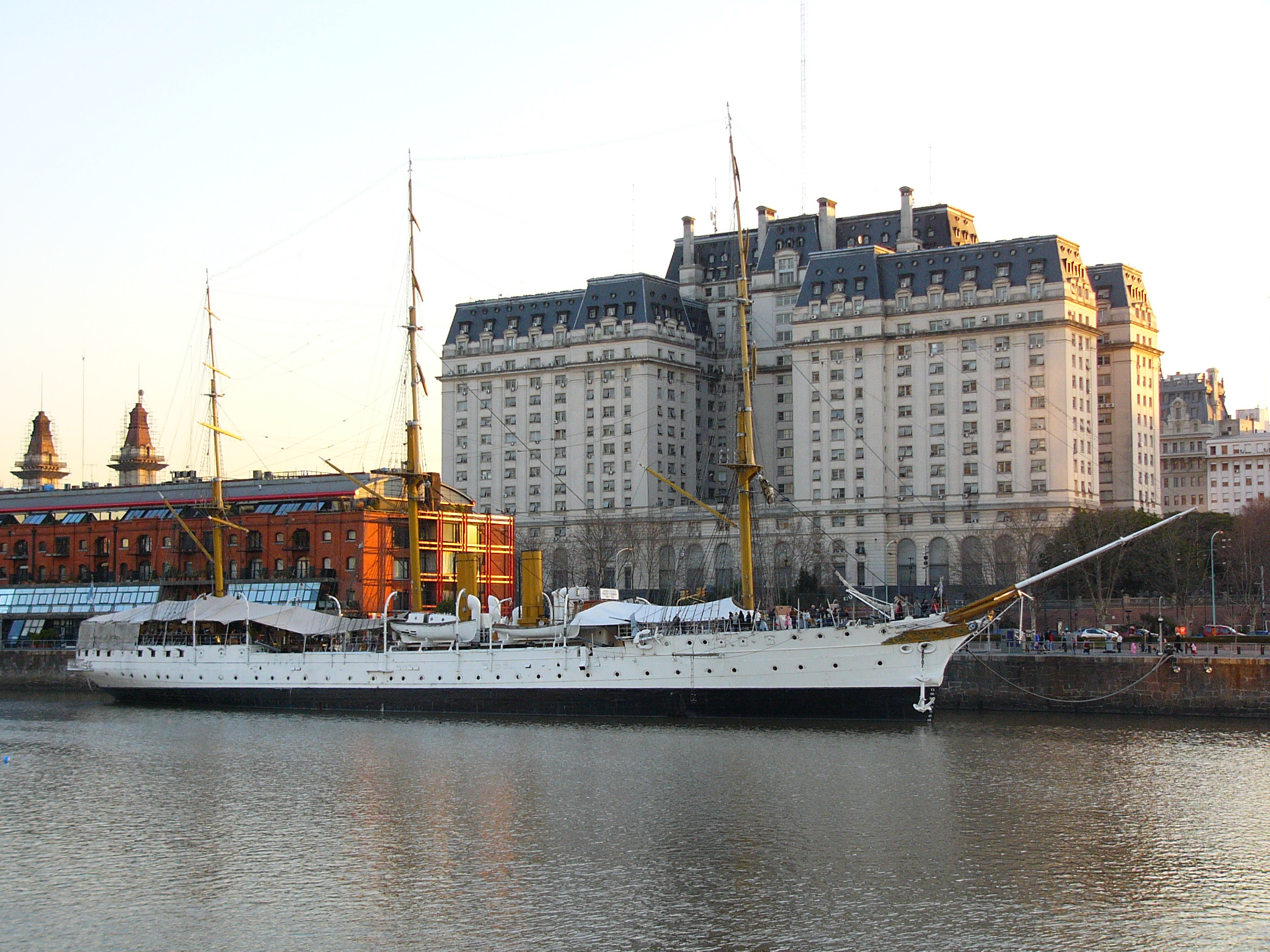
The training ship Sarmiento and the Ministry of Defense, Buenos Aires

In 1929, Argentina was wealthy by world standards, but the prosperity ended after 1929 with the worldwide Great Depression. In 1930, a military coup, supported by the Argentine Patriotic League, forced Hipólito Yrigoyen from power, and replaced him with José Félix Uriburu. Support for the coup was bolstered by the sagging Argentine economy, as well as a string of bomb attacks and shootings involving radical anarchists, which alienated moderate elements of Argentine society and angered the conservative right, which had long been agitating for decisive action by the military forces.

The military coup initiated during the period known as the "Infamous Decade", characterized by electoral fraud, persecution of the political opposition (mainly against the UCR) and pervasive government corruption, against the background of the global depression.

During his brief tenure as president, Uriburu cracked down heavily on anarchists and other far-left groups, resulting in 2,000 illegal executions of members of anarchist and communist groups. The most famous (and perhaps most symbolic of anarchism's decay in Argentina at the time) was the execution of Severino Di Giovanni, who was captured in late January 1931 and executed on the first of February of the same year.

After becoming president through the coup, Uriburu attempted to create a constitutional reform that would include corporatism in the Argentine Constitution. This move toward fascism was viewed negatively by the conservative backers of the coup and they turned their support to the more moderate conservative general Agustín P. Justo, who won the presidency in a 1932 election that was heavily fraudulent.

Justo began a policy of liberal economic moves that primarily benefitted the nation's upper classes and permitted great political and industrial corruption at the expense of national growth. One of the most infamous decisions of Justo's government was the creation of the Roca–Runciman Treaty between Argentina and the United Kingdom, which benefitted the British economy and the rich beef producers of Argentina.

In 1935, progressive democrat Senator Lisandro de la Torre began an investigation into several corruption allegations within the Argentine beef production industry, during which he attempted to charge Justo's Minister of Agriculture, Luis Duhau, and the Minister of Finance, Federico Pinedo, with political corruption and fraud charges. During the exposition of the investigation in the National Congress, Duhau started a fight among the senators, during which his bodyguard, Ramón Valdez-Cora, tried to kill De La Torre but accidentally ended up shooting De La Torre's friend and political partner Enzo Bordabehere. The meat investigation was dropped soon afterward, but not before De La Torre managed to achieve the incarceration of the head of the Anglo meat company for corruption charges. De la Torre would later commit suicide in 1939.

The collapse of international trade led to industrial growth focused on import substitution, leading to a stronger economic independence. Political conflict increased, marked by confrontation between right-wing fascists and leftist radicals, while military-oriented conservatives controlled the government. Though many claimed the polls to be fraudulent, Roberto Ortiz was elected president in 1937 and took office the next year, but due to his fragile health he was succeeded by his vice-president, Ramón Castillo. Castillo effectively took power in 1940; he formally assumed leadership in 1942.

== Revolution of '43 (1943–1946) ==
The civilian government appeared to be close to joining the Allies, but many officers of the Argentine armed forces (and ordinary Argentine citizens) objected due to fear of the spread of communism. There was a wide support to stay neutral in the conflict, as during World War I. The government was also questioned for domestic policy reasons, namely, electoral fraud, poor labour rights, and the selection of Patrón Costas to run for the presidency.

On 4 June 1943, the United Officers' Group (GOU), which was a secret alliance between military leaders led by Pedro Pablo Ramírez, Arturo Rawson, Edelmiro Farrell, and Farrell's protégé Juan Perón, marched to the Casa Rosada and demanded the resignation of president Castillo. After hours of threats, their goal was achieved and the president resigned. This event is considered by historians to be the official end of the Infamous Decade.

After the coup, Ramírez took power. Although he did not declare war, he broke off relations with the Axis powers. Argentina's largest neighbor, Brazil, had already entered the war on the Allied side in 1942.

In 1944 Ramirez was replaced by Farrell, an army officer of Irish-Argentine origin who had spent two years attached to Mussolini's army in the twenties. Initially, his government continued to maintain a neutral policy. Towards the end of the war, Farrell decided it was in the interests of Argentina to be attached to the winning side. Like several Latin American states, Argentina made a late declaration of war against Germany on 27 March 1945, as Germany was fast collapsing.

Juan Perón managed relations with labourers and unions, and became highly popular. He was deposed and detained on Martín García Island, but a massive demonstration on 17 October 1945, forced the government to free Perón and restore him to office. Perón would win the elections shortly afterward by a landslide. The US ambassador, Spruille Braden, took direct action in Argentine politics supporting the antiperonist parties.

== Peronist years (1946–1955) ==
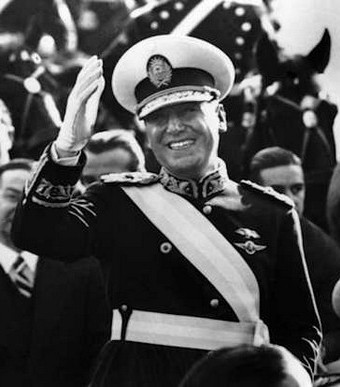
President Juan Perón (1946)

In 1946 General Juan Perón became president; his populist ideology became known as peronism. His popular wife Eva Perón played a leading political role until her death in 1952.

His government was influential for initiating industrialization in Argentina, expanding social rights (such as for workers, women, children, and the elderly) and making public university tuition-free. Alongside his wife, Eva Duarte ("Evita"), they also pushed for women's suffrage, provided charity and built approximately half a million houses. Other relevant measures include reforming the constitution in 1949; the creation of the UTN (originally named National Worker's University); paying off all the national debt; nationalizing the central bank, the entire banking system and the railways.

His government was also known to employ authoritarian tactics; many dissidents were fired, exiled, or arrested, and much of the press was closely controlled. Several fascist war criminals, such as Josef Mengele, Adolf Eichmann, and Ante Pavelić, were given refuge in Argentina during this time.

== Revolución Libertadora (1955–1958) ==
In Argentina, the 1950s and 1960s were marked by frequent coups d'état, low economic growth in the 1950s and high growth rates in the 1960s. Argentina faced problems of continued social and labor demands. Argentine painter Antonio Berni's works reflected the social tragedies of these times, painting in particular life in the villas miseria (shanty towns).

Following the Revolución Libertadora military coup, Eduardo Lonardi held power only briefly and was succeeded by Pedro Aramburu, president from 13 November 1955, to 1 May 1958. In June 1956, two Peronist generals, Juan José Valle and Raul Tanco, attempted a coup against Aramburu, criticizing an important purge in the army, the abrogation of social reforms and persecution of trade-union leaders. They also demanded liberation of all political and labor activists and a return to constitutional order. The uprising was quickly crushed. General Valle and other members of the military were executed, and twenty civilians were arrested at their homes and their bodies were thrown in the León Suarez dumping ground.

Along with the June 1955 Casa Rosada bombing on the Plaza de Mayo, the León Suarez massacre is one of the important events that started a cycle of violence. Pedro Aramburu was later kidnapped and executed for this massacre, in 1970, by Fernando Abal Medina, Emilio Angel Maza, Mario Firmenich and others, who would later form the Montoneros movement.

In 1956, special elections were held to reform the constitution. The Radical Party under Ricardo Balbín won a majority, although 25% of all ballots were turned in the blank as a protest by the banned Peronist party. Also in support of Peronism, the left wing of the Radical Party, led by Arturo Frondizi, left the Constitutional Assembly. The Assembly was severely damaged by this defection and was only able to restore the Constitution of 1853 with the sole addition of the Article 14 bis, which enumerated some social rights.

== Fragile radical administrations (1958–1966) ==
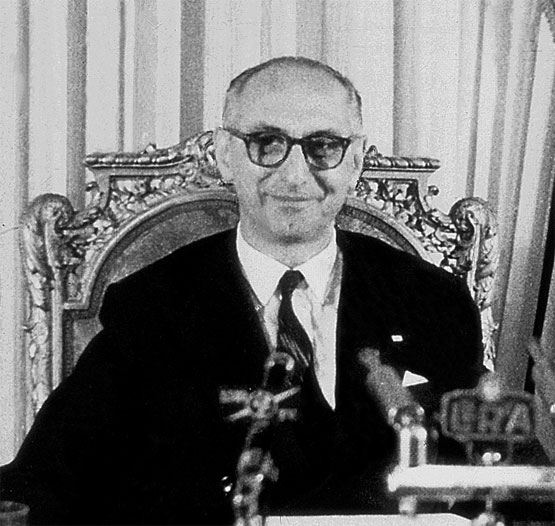
President Arturo Frondizi

A ban on Peronist expression and representation continued during the fragile civilian governments of the period 1958–1966. Frondizi, UCRI's candidate, won the presidential elections of 1958, obtaining approximately 4,000,000 votes against 2,500,000 for Ricardo Balbín (with 800,000 neutral votes). From Caracas, Perón supported Frondizi and called upon his supporters to vote for him, as a means toward the end of prohibition of the Peronist movement and the re-establishment of the workers' social legislation voted during Perón's leadership.

On one hand, Frondizi appointed Álvaro Alsogaray as Minister of Economy to placate powerful agrarian interests and other conservatives. A member of the powerful military dynasty Alsogaray, Álvaro, who had already been Minister of Industry under Aramburu's military rule, devalued the peso and imposed credit control.

On the other hand, Frondizi followed a laicist program, which raised concerns among the Catholic nationalist forces, leading to the organization, between 1960 and 1962, of the far-right Tacuara Nationalist Movement.

The Tacuara, the "first urban guerrilla group in Argentina", engaged in several anti-Semitic bombings, in particular following Adolf Eichmann's kidnapping by the Mossad in 1960. During the visit of Dwight Eisenhower to Argentina, in February 1962 (Eisenhower had been until 1961 President of the United States), the Tacuara headed nationalist demonstrations against him, leading to the imprisonment of several of their leaders, among them Joe Baxter.

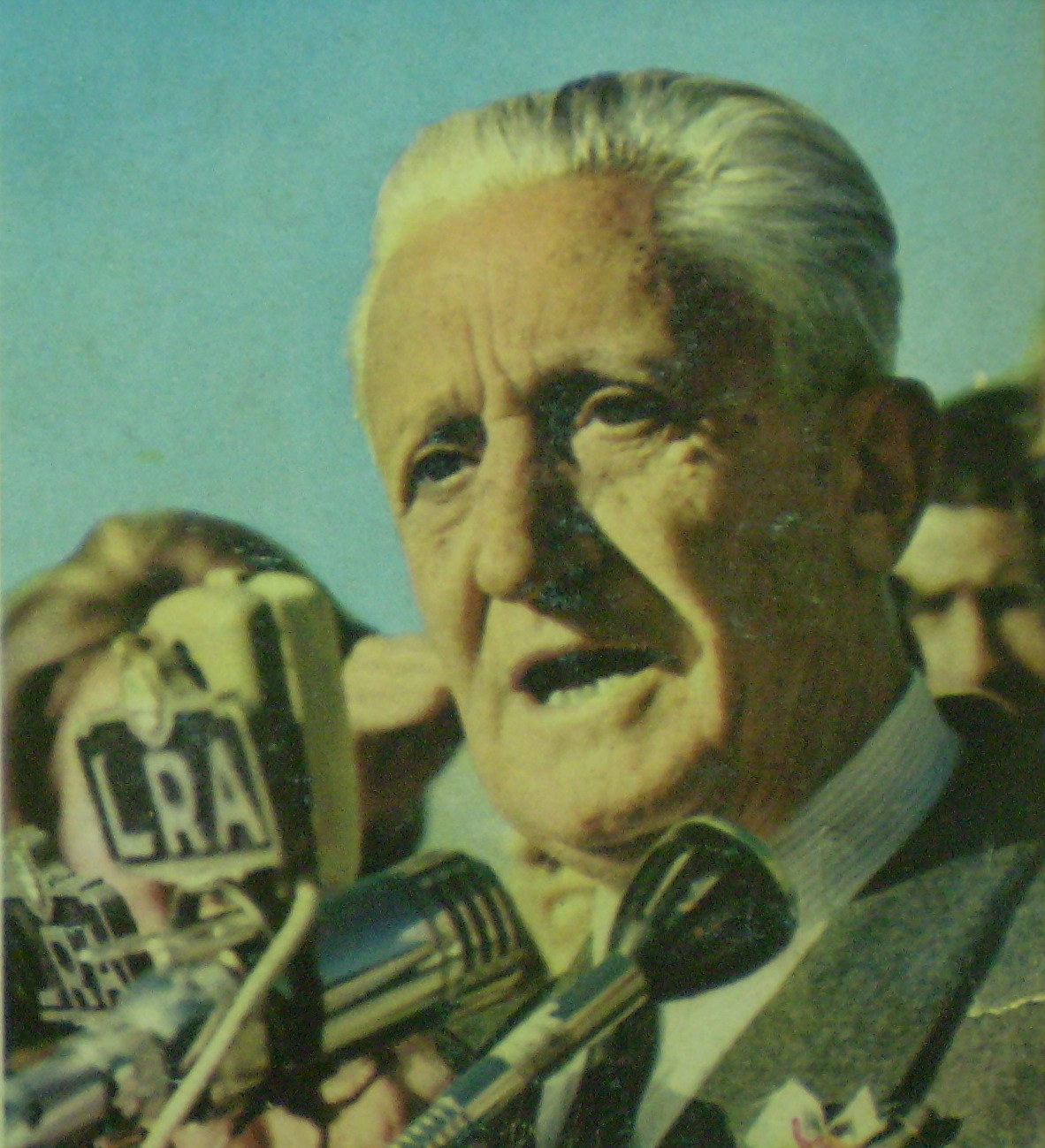
The ousting of President Arturo Illia was initially broadly supported but later deeply regretted by the Argentine population.

However, Frondizi's government ended in 1962 with intervention yet again by the military, after a series of local elections were won by the Peronist candidates. José María Guido, chairman of the senate, claimed the presidency on constitutional grounds before the deeply divided armed forces were able to agree on a name. Right-wing elements in the Argentine armed forces in favor of direct military rule and the suppression of former Peronist politicians, subsequently attempted to wrest control of the government in the 1963 Argentine Navy Revolt on 2 April. The failure of the revolt's plotters to win the loyalty of army units near the capital permitted Guido's government to swiftly put down the revolt at the cost of 21 lives.

In new elections in 1963, neither Peronists nor Communists were allowed to participate. Arturo Illia of the Radical People's Party won these elections; regional elections and by-elections over the next few years favored Peronists.

On the other hand, the Tacuara were outlawed by Illia in 1965, some of its members ultimately turning to the Peronist Left (such as Joe Baxter) while others remained in their far-right positions (such as Alberto Ezcurra Uriburu, who would work with the Triple A).

Despite the fact that the country grew and developed economically during Illia's tenure as president, he was eventually ousted in a military coup in 1966.

== Revolución Argentina (1966–1973) ==
Amidst growing worker and student unrest, another coup took place in June 1966, self-designated Revolución Argentina (Argentine Revolution), which established General Juan Carlos Onganía as de facto president, supported by several leaders of the General Confederation of Labour (CGT), among these the general secretary, Augusto Vandor. This led to a series of military-appointed presidents.

While preceding military coups were aimed at establishing temporary, transitional juntas, the Revolución Argentina headed by Onganía aimed at establishing a new political and social order, opposed both to liberal democracy and communism, which gave to the Armed Forces of Argentina a leading, political role in the economic rationalization of the country. The political scientist Guillermo O'Donnell named this type of regime an "authoritarian-bureaucratic state", in reference both to the Revolución Argentina, the Brazilian military regime (1964–85), Augusto Pinochet's regime (starting in 1973) and Juan María Bordaberry's regime in Uruguay.

Onganía's Minister of Economy, Adalbert Krieger Vasena, decreed a wage freeze and a 40% devaluation of the currency, which strongly affected the state of the Argentine economy, in particular the agricultural sector, favoring foreign capital. Vasena suspended collective labour conventions, reformed the hydrocarbon law which had established a partial monopoly of the Yacimientos Petrolíferos Fiscales (YPF) state enterprise, as well as passing a law facilitating expulsions in case of failure to pay rent. Finally, the right to strike was suspended (Law 16,936) and several other laws reversed progress made concerning labor laws throughout the preceding years.

The workers' movement divided itself between Vandoristas, who supported a "Peronism without Peron" line (Vandor declared that "to save Perón, one has to be against Perón") and advocated negotiation with the junta, and Peronists, themselves divided.

On 29 July 1966, Onganía ordered the forcible clearing of five facilities of the University of Buenos Aires (UBA) by the Federal Police, an event known as La Noche de los Bastones Largos ("The Night of the Long Batons"). These facilities had been occupied by students, professors and graduates (members of the autonomous government of the university) who opposed the military government's intervention in the universities and revocation of the 1918 university reform. The university repression led to the exile of 301 university professors, including Manuel Sadosky, Tulio Halperín Donghi, Sergio Bagú and Risieri Frondizi.

In late May 1968 General Julio Alsogaray dissented from Onganía, and rumors spread about a possible coup d'état, with Algosaray leading the conservative opposition to Onganía. Finally, at the end of the month, Onganía dismissed the leaders of the Armed Forces: Alejandro Lanusse replaced Julio Alsogaray, Pedro Gnavi replaced Benigno Varela, and Jorge Martínez Zuviría replaced Adolfo Alvarez.

On 19 September 1968, two important events affected Revolutionary Peronism. On one hand, John William Cooke, former personal delegate of Perón and ideologist of the Peronist Left, as well as a friend of Fidel Castro, died from natural causes. On the other hand, a small group (13 men and one woman) who aimed at establishing a foco in Tucumán Province, in order to head the resistance against the junta, was captured. Among them was Envar El Kadre, then a leader of the Peronist Youth.

In 1969 the General Confederation of Labour of the Argentines (CGTA, headed by the graphist Raimundo Ongaro) headed social movements, in particular the Cordobazo, as well as other movements in Tucumán and Santa Fe. While Perón managed a reconciliation with Augusto Vandor, head of the CGT Azopardo, he followed, in particular through the voice of his delegate Jorge Paladino, a cautious line of opposition to the military junta, criticizing with moderation the neoliberal policies of the junta but waiting for discontent inside the government ("hay que desensillar hasta que aclare", said Perón, advocating patience). Thus, Onganía had an interview with 46 CGT delegates, among them Vandor, who agreed to cooperate with the military junta, thus uniting themselves with the Nueva Corriente de Opinión headed by José Alonso and Rogelio Coria.

In December 1969, more than 20 priests, members of the Movement of Priests for the Third World (MSTM), marched on the Casa Rosada to present to Onganía a petition pleading with him to abandon the planned eradication of villas miserias (shanty towns).

Meanwhile, Onganía implemented corporatism policies, experimenting in particular in Córdoba, underneath Carlos Caballero's governance. The same year, the Movement of Priests for the Third World issued a declaration supporting socialist revolutionary movements, which led to the Catholic hierarchy, by the voice of Juan Carlos Aramburu, coadjutor archbishop of Buenos Aires, to proscribe priests from making political or social declarations.

== Growing instability (1969–1976) ==
During the de facto government of the Revolución Argentina, the left began to regain power through underground movements. This was mainly through violent guerrilla groups. Later, the return of Peronism was expected to calm down the heated waters but did exactly the opposite, creating a violent breach between right-wing and left-wing Peronism, leading to years of violence and political instability that culminated with the coup d'état of 1976.

=== Subversion years (1969–1973) ===
Various armed actions, headed by the Fuerzas Armadas de Liberación (FAL), composed of former members of the Revolutionary Communist Party, occurred in April 1969, leading to several arrests among FAL members. These were the first left-wing urban guerrilla actions in Argentina. Beside these isolated actions, the Cordobazo uprising that year, called forth by the CGT de los Argentinos, and its Cordobese leader, Agustín Tosco, prompted demonstrations in the entire country. The same year, the People's Revolutionary Army (ERP) was formed as the military branch of the Trotskyist Workers' Revolutionary Party, kidnapping high-profile rich Argentines and demanding ransom.

The last of the "de facto" military presidents, Alejandro Lanusse, was appointed in 1971 and attempted to re-establish democracy amidst an atmosphere of continuing Peronist workers' protests. In attempt to pacifiy the rising tide of resistance, the military government was ultimately forced to make concessions such as lifting the proscription of Peronism, holding open elections in 1973, and funding state housing initiatives addressing Shantytowns.

=== Cámpora's tenure (1973) ===
On 11 March 1973, Argentina held general elections for the first time in ten years. Perón was prevented from running, but voters elected his stand-in, Dr. Hector Cámpora, as president. Cámpora defeated his Radical Civic Union opponent. Cámpora won 49.5 percent of the votes in the presidential election following a campaign based on a platform of national reconstruction.

Riding a wave of mass support, Cámpora inaugurated his period on 25 May. He acceded to his functions on 25 May, which was saluted by a massive popular gathering of the Peronist Youth movement, Montoneros, FAR and FAP ("Fuerzas Armadas Peronistas") in the Plaza de Mayo. Cámpora assumed a strong stance against right-wing Peronists, declaring during his first speech: "La sangre derramada no será negociada" ("Spilled blood will not be negotiated").

Cuban president Osvaldo Dorticós and Chilea president Salvador Allende were present at his inauguration, while William P. Rogers, U.S. Secretary of State, and Uruguaya dictator Juan Bordaberry, could not attend, blocked in their respective cars by demonstrators. Political prisoners were liberated on the same day, under the pressure of the demonstrators. Cámpora's government included progressive figures such as Interior Minister Esteban Righi and Education Minister Jorge Taiana, but also included members of the labor and political right-wing Peronist factions, such as José López Rega, Perón's personal secretary and Minister of Social Welfare, and a member of the P2 Masonic lodge. Perón's followers also commanded strong majorities in both houses of Congress.

Hector Cámpora's government followed a traditional Peronist economic policy, supporting the national market and redistributing wealth. One of José Ber Gelbard's first measures as minister of economics was to augment workers' wages. However, the 1973 oil crisis seriously affected Argentina's oil-dependent economy. Almost 600 social conflicts, strikes or occupations occurred in Cámpora's first month. The military conceded Campora's victory, but strikes, as well as government-backed violence, continued unabated. The slogan "Cámpora al gobierno, Perón al poder" ("Campora in government, Perón in power") expressed the real source of popular joy, however.

=== Return of Perón (1973–1974) ===
Amidst escalating terror from the right and left alike, Perón decided to return and assume the presidency. On 20 June 1973, two million people waited for him at Ezeiza airport. From Perón's speaking platform, camouflaged far-right gunmen fired on the masses, shooting at the Peronist Youth movement and the Montoneros, killing at least thirteen and injuring more than three hundred (this became known as the Ezeiza massacre).

Cámpora and vice-president Solano Lima resigned on 13 July. Deputy Raúl Alberto Lastiri, José López Rega's son-in-law and also a P2 member, was then promoted to the presidency to organize elections. Cámpora's followers such as Chancellor Juan Carlos Puig and Interior Minister Esteban Righi were immediately replaced by Alberto J. Vignes and Benito Llambi, and the Ejército Revolucionario del Pueblo (ERP – People's Revolutionary Army) was declared a "dissolved terrorist organization". On 23 September, Perón won the elections with 61.85% of the votes, with his third wife, Isabel Perón, as vice-president. Their administration was inaugurated on 12 October.

Peronist right-wing factions won a decisive victory and Perón assumed the Presidency in October 1973, a month after Pinochet's coup in Chile. Violent acts, including by the Triple A, continued to threaten public order. On 25 September 1973, José Ignacio Rucci, CGT trade-union's Secretary General and Perón's friend, was assassinated by the Montoneros. The government resorted to a number of emergency decrees, including the implementation of special executive authority to deal with violence. This allowed the government to imprison individuals indefinitely without charge.

In his second period in office, Perón was committed to achieving political peace through a new alliance of business and labour to promote national reconstruction. Peron's charisma and his past record with respect to labor helped him maintain his working-class support.

=== Isabel's government (1974–1976) ===
Perón died on 1 July 1974. His wife succeeded him in office, but her administration was undermined by the economic collapse (inflation was skyrocketing and GDP contracted), Peronist intra-party struggles, and growing acts of terrorism by insurgents such as the ERP and paramilitary movements.

Isabel Perón was inexperienced in politics and only carried Perón's name; Lopez Rega was described as a man with numerous occult interests, including astrology, and a supporter of dissident Catholic groups. Economic policies were directed at restructuring wages and currency devaluations in order to attract foreign investment capital to Argentina. López Rega was ousted as Isabel Perón's adviser in June 1975; General Numa Laplane, the commander in chief of the army who had supported the administration through the Lopez Rega period, was replaced by General Jorge Rafael Videla in August 1975.

Montoneros, led by Mario Firmenich, cautiously decided to go underground after Peron's death. Isabel Perón was removed from office by the military coup on 24 March 1976. This gave way to the last and arguably most violent de facto government in Argentina, the National Reorganization Process.

== National Reorganization Process (1976–1983) ==
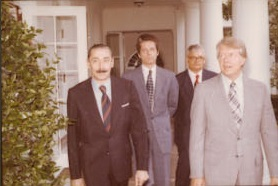
Argentine junta leader Jorge Rafael Videla meeting U.S. President Jimmy Carter in September 1977

Following the coup against Isabel Perón, the armed forces formally exercised power through a junta led consecutively by Videla, Viola, Galtieri and Bignone until 10 December 1983. These de facto dictators termed their government program the "National Reorganization Process"; and "Dirty War" (Spanish: guerra sucia) was the name used by the military junta or civic-military dictatorship of Argentina (Spanish: dictadura cívico-militar de Argentina) for this period of state terrorism in Argentina from 1974, during which military and security forces and right-wing death squads in the form of the Argentine Anticommunist Alliance (Triple A) hunted down any kind of (or suspected to be) political dissidents and anyone believed to be associated with socialism, communism, left-wing Peronism, or the Montoneros movement. The death squads were formed from armed sections of the large labor unions, parapolice organizations within the federal and provincial police; and the AAA (Alianza Anticomunista Argentina), was founded by Perón's secretary of social welfare, López Rega, with the participation of the federal police. It was linked to Operation Condor. About 30,000 people were killed or disappeared during this period.

The targets were students, militants, trade unionists, writers, journalists, artists and anyone suspected to be a left-wing activist, including Peronist guerrillas. The "disappeared" (victims kidnapped, tortured and murdered whose bodies were disappeared by the military government) included those thought to be politically or ideologically a threat to the military junta, even vaguely; and they were killed in an attempt by the junta to silence the social and political opposition.

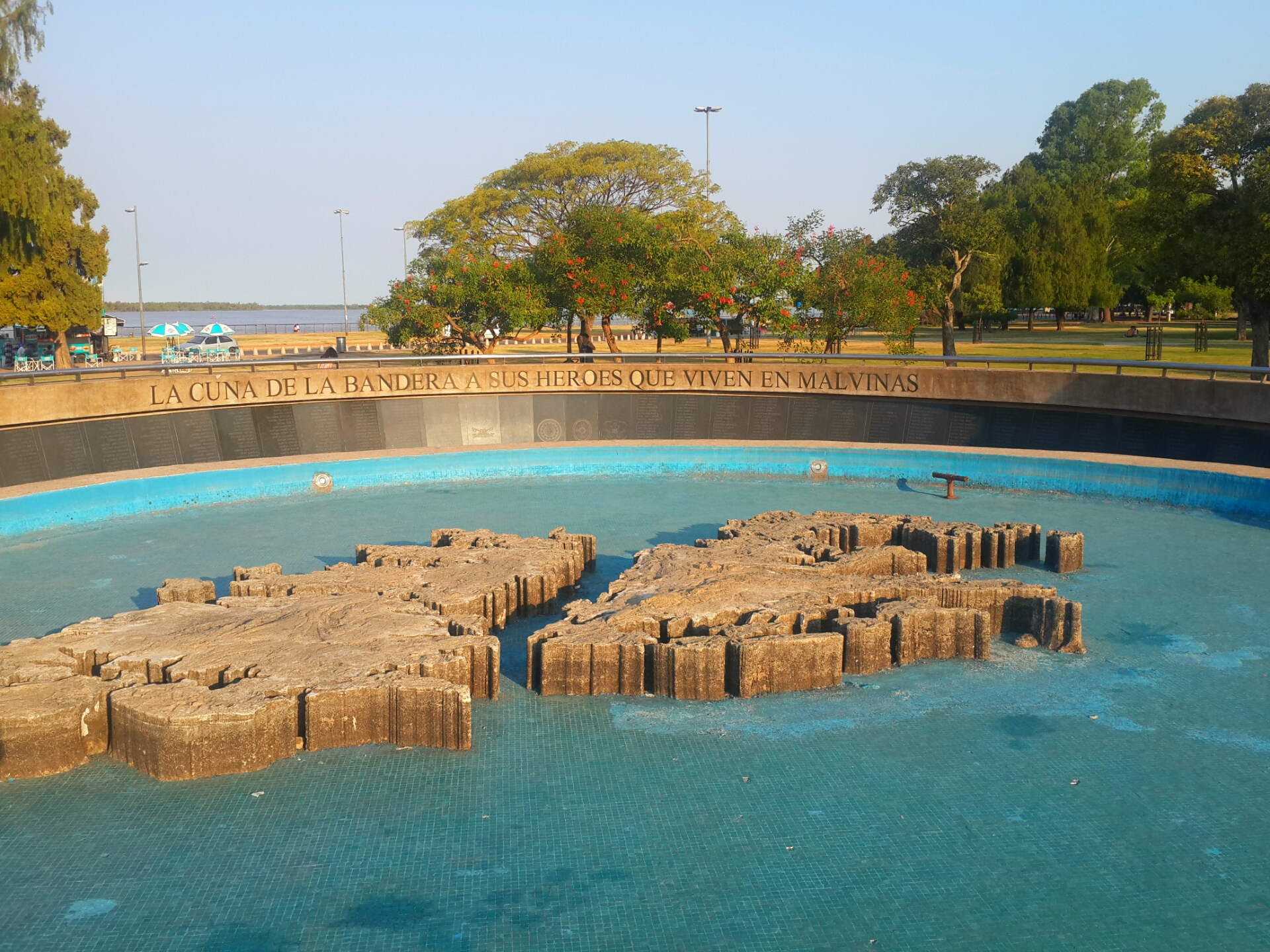
Monument to the Falklands War fallen, Rosario

Serious economic problems, mounting charges of corruption, public discontent and, finally, the country's 1982 defeat by the United Kingdom in the Falklands War following Argentina's unsuccessful attempt to seize the Falkland Islands all combined to discredit the Argentine military regime. Under strong public pressure, the junta lifted bans on political parties and gradually restored basic political liberties.

Most of the members of the Junta are currently in prison for crimes against humanity and genocide.

=== Beagle conflict ===
The Beagle conflict began to brew in the 1960s, when Argentina began to claim that the Picton, Lennox and Nueva islands in the Beagle Channel were rightfully hers. In 1971, Chile and Argentina signed an agreement formally submitting the Beagle Channel issue to binding Beagle Channel Arbitration. On 2 May 1977, the court ruled that the islands and all adjacent formations belonged to Chile. See the Report and decision of the Court of Arbitration.

On 25 January 1978, the Argentina military junta led by General Jorge Videla declared the award fundamentally null and intensified their claim over the islands. On 22 December 1978, Argentina started Operation Soberanía over the disputed islands, but the invasion was halted due to:

(The newspaper Clarín explained some years later that such caution was based,) in part, on military concerns. In order to achieve a victory, certain objectives had to be reached before the seventh day after the attack. Some military leaders considered this not enough time due to the difficulty involved in transportation through the passes over the Andean Mountains.

and in cite 46:

According to Clarín, two consequences were feared. First, those who were dubious feared a possible regionalization of the conflict. Second, as a consequence, the conflict could acquire great power proportions. In the first case decision makers speculated that Peru, Bolivia, Ecuador, and Brazil might intervene. Then the great powers could take sides. In this case, the resolution of the conflict would depend not on the combatants, but on the countries that supplied the weapons.

In December that year, moments before Videla signed a declaration of war against Chile, Pope John Paul II agreed to mediate between the two nations. The Pope's envoy, Cardinal Antonio Samorè, successfully averted war and proposed a new definitive boundary in which the three disputed islands would remain Chilean. Argentina and Chile both agreed to Samoré's proposal and signed the Treaty of Peace and Friendship of 1984 between Chile and Argentina, ending that dispute.

== New democracy (1983–present) ==
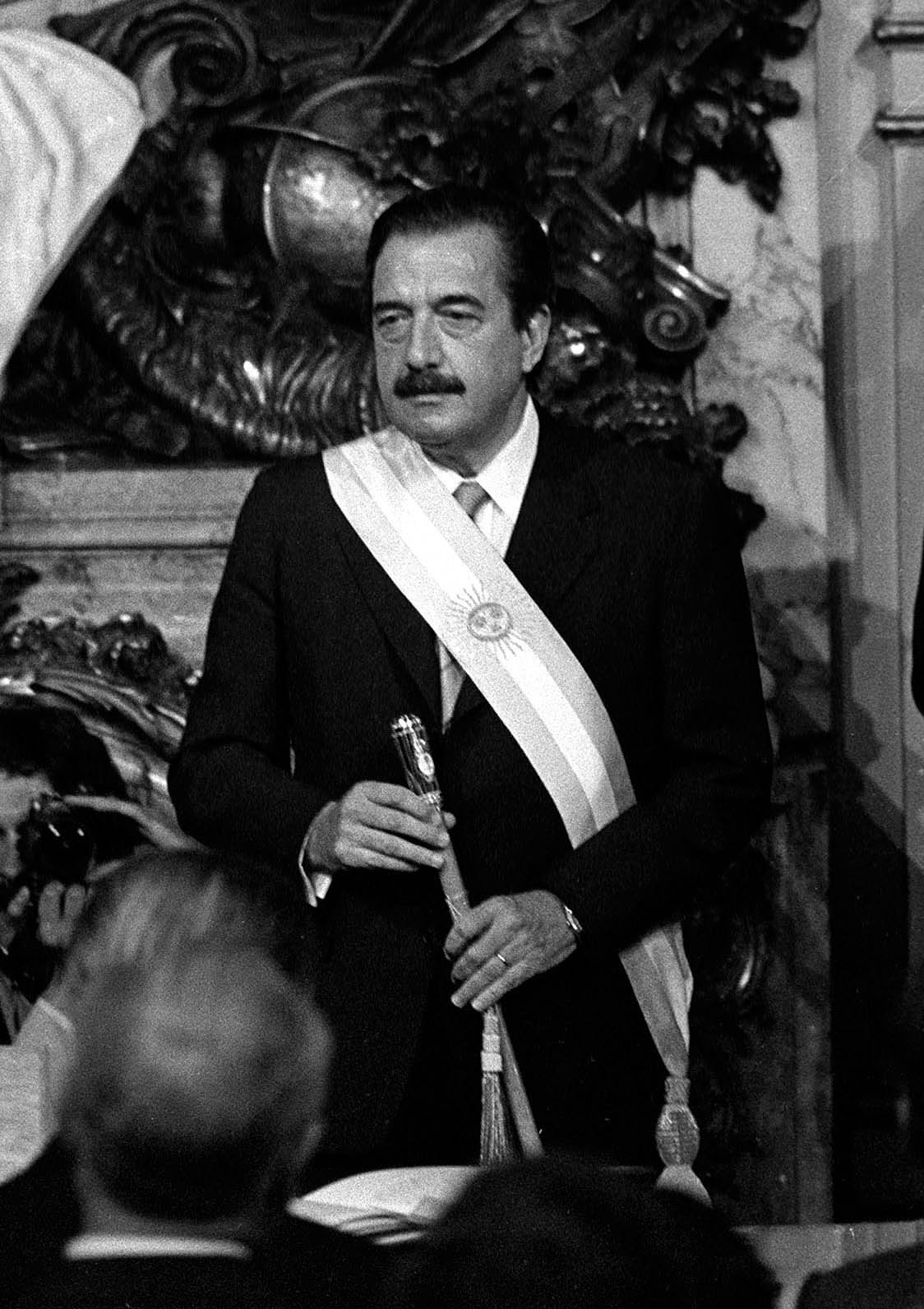
Raúl Alfonsín's presidential inauguration, 1983

On 30 October 1983, Argentines went to the polls to choose a president; vice-president; and national, provincial, and local officials in elections found by international observers to be fair and honest. The country returned to constitutional rule after Raúl Alfonsín, candidate of the Radical Civic Union (Unión Cívica Radical, UCR), received 52% of the popular vote for president. He began a 6-year term of office on 10 December 1983.

=== Alfonsín era (1983–1989) ===
Five days later, he created the National Commission on the Disappearance of Persons (CONADEP), led by Argentine writer Ernesto Sabato. However, it was also under Alfonsín's presidency that the 24 December 1986 "Full stop law" was voted, granting amnesty to all acts committed before 10 December 1983, amid pressure from the military. It would not be until June 2005's Supreme Court decision to overturn all amnesty laws that investigations could be started again.

During the Alfonsín administration, a Treaty of Peace and Friendship of 1984 between Chile and Argentina with Chile was signed and the roots of the Mercosur trade bloc were established.

In 1985 and 1987, large turnouts for mid-term elections demonstrated continued public support for a strong and vigorous democratic system. The UCR-led government took steps to resolve some of the nation's most pressing problems, including accounting for those who disappeared during military rule, establishing civilian control of the armed forces, and consolidating democratic institutions. One of the biggest achievements of the Alfonsín administration was the reduction of corruption in public offices, which was reduced by half during his administration.

However, constant friction with the military, failure to resolve several economic problems inherited from the military dictatorship and great opposition from the labor unions undermined the effectiveness of the Alfonsín government, which left office six months early after Peronist candidate Carlos Menem won the 1989 presidential elections.

=== Menemist decade (1989–99) ===
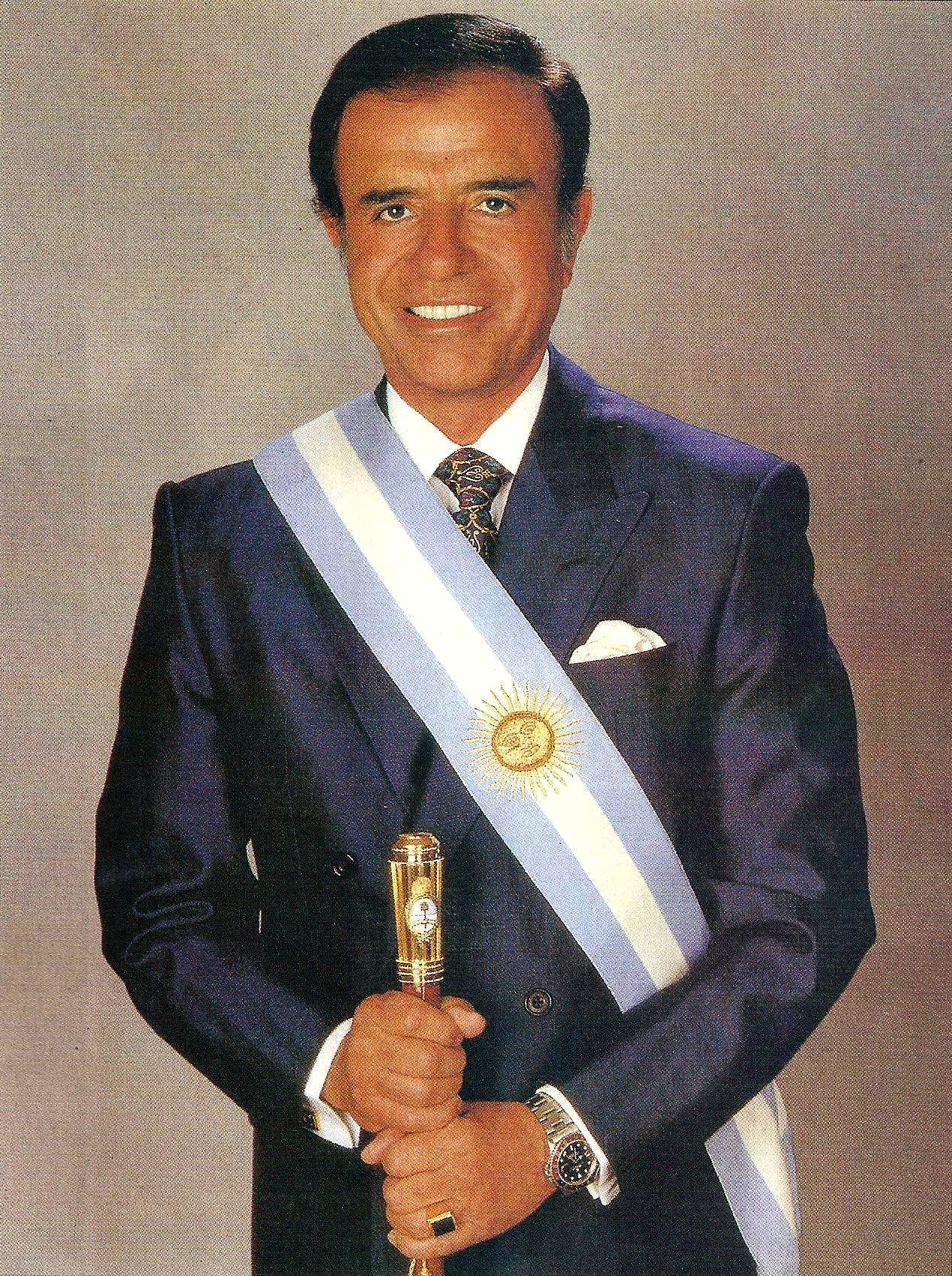
Carlos Menem served as President of Argentina from 1989 to 1999.

As President, Carlos Menem launched a major overhaul of Argentine domestic policy. Large-scale structural reforms dramatically reversed the role of the state in Argentine economic life. Ironically, the Peronist Menem oversaw the privatization of many of the industries Perón had nationalized.

A decisive leader pressing a controversial agenda, Menem was not reluctant to use the presidency's powers to issue "emergency" decrees (formally Necessity and Urgency Decrees) when the Congress was unable to reach consensus on his proposed reforms. Those powers were curtailed somewhat when the constitution was reformed in 1994 as a result of the so-called Pact of Olivos with the opposition Radical Party. That arrangement opened the way for Menem to seek and win reelection with 50% of the vote in the three-way 1995 presidential race. Piquetero movement rose.

The 1995 election saw the emergence of the moderate-left FrePaSo political alliance. This alternative to the two traditional political parties in Argentina was particularly strong in Buenos Aires but lacked the national infrastructure of the Peronists and Radicals. In an important development in Argentina's political life, all three major parties in the 1999 race espoused free market economic policies.

=== New millennium crisis (1999–2003) ===
==== De La Rúa presidency (1999–2001) ====
In October 1999, the UCR–FrePaSo Alianza's presidential candidate, Fernando de la Rúa, defeated Peronist candidate Eduardo Duhalde. Having taken office in December 1999, De la Rúa followed an IMF-sponsored program of government spending cuts, revenue increases, and provincial revenue-sharing reforms to get the federal fiscal deficit under control, and pursued labor market flexibilization and business-promotion measures aimed at stimulating foreign investment, so as to avoid defaulting the public debt.

Towards the end of 2001, Argentina faced grave economic problems. The IMF pressed Argentina to service its external debt, effectively forcing Argentina to devalue the Argentine peso, which had been pegged to the U.S. dollar, or alternatively fully dollarize its economy. Deep budget cuts, including a 13% reduction in pay for the nation's 2 million public sector employees, failed to curb the rapidly increasing country risk on almost U$100 billion in Argentine bonds, increasing debt service costs and further limiting access to international credit, despite a moderately successful debt swap arranged by Minister Cavallo with most bondholders. Voters reacted to the rapidly worsening economy in the October 2001 midterm elections by both depriving the Alliance of its majority in the Lower House, and by casting a record 25% of spoiled ballots.

==== Corralito (2001) ====
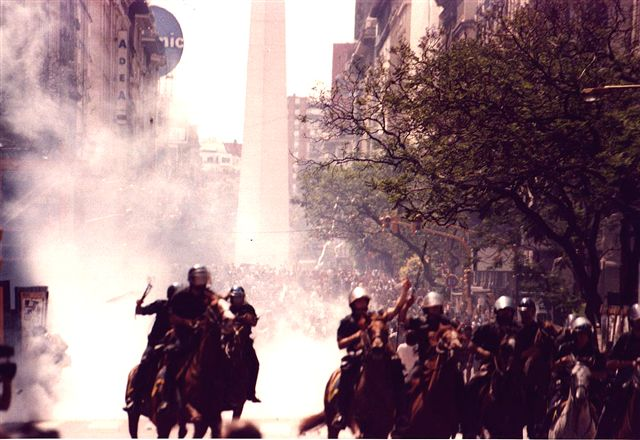
Police intervention in the 2001 riots

On 1 November 2001, as people's fears that the peso would be devalued caused massive withdrawal of bank deposits and capital flight, de la Rúa's Minister of Economy Domingo Cavallo passed regulations severely limiting withdrawals, effectively freezing the peso-denominated assets of the Argentine middle class, while dollar-denominated foreign accounts were, by its very nature, shielded from devaluation. (The freezing of the bank accounts was informally named corralito.)

The overall economy declined drastically during December 2001. The resulting riots led to dozens of deaths. The Minister of Economy Domingo Cavallo resigned, but that did not prevent the collapse of De la Rúa's administration. On 20 December de la Rúa also resigned, but the political crisis was extremely serious, as a result of the previous resignation of the vice-president Carlos "Chacho" Álvarez in 2000. The president of the Senate became interim president until the National Congress elected, two days later, Adolfo Rodríguez Saá to finish De la Rúa's term. But Rodríguez Saá resigned a week later on 31 December, leaving the power to the president of the Chamber of Deputies (as the Senate was undergoing its annual renovation of its president) as interim.

Finally, on 2 January 2002, the National Congress elected the Peronist Eduardo Duhalde, a losing candidate in the most recent presidential election, as president. The peso was first devalued by 29%, and then the dollar peg was abandoned; by July 2002, the national currency had depreciated to one-quarter of its former value.

==== Recovery (2002–03) ====
President Duhalde faced a country in turmoil. His administration had to deal with a wave of protests (middle-class cacerolazos and unemployed piqueteros), and did so with a relatively tolerant policy, intending to minimize violence. As inflation became a serious issue and the effects of the crisis became apparent in the form of increased unemployment and poverty, Duhalde chose a moderate, low-profile economist, Roberto Lavagna, as his Minister of Economy. The economic measures implemented brought inflation under control.

After a year, Duhalde deemed his tasks fulfilled and, pressured by certain political factors, called for elections, which in April 2003 brought Néstor Kirchner, the center left Peronist governor of Santa Cruz, to power.

=== Kirchner governments (2003–2015) ===
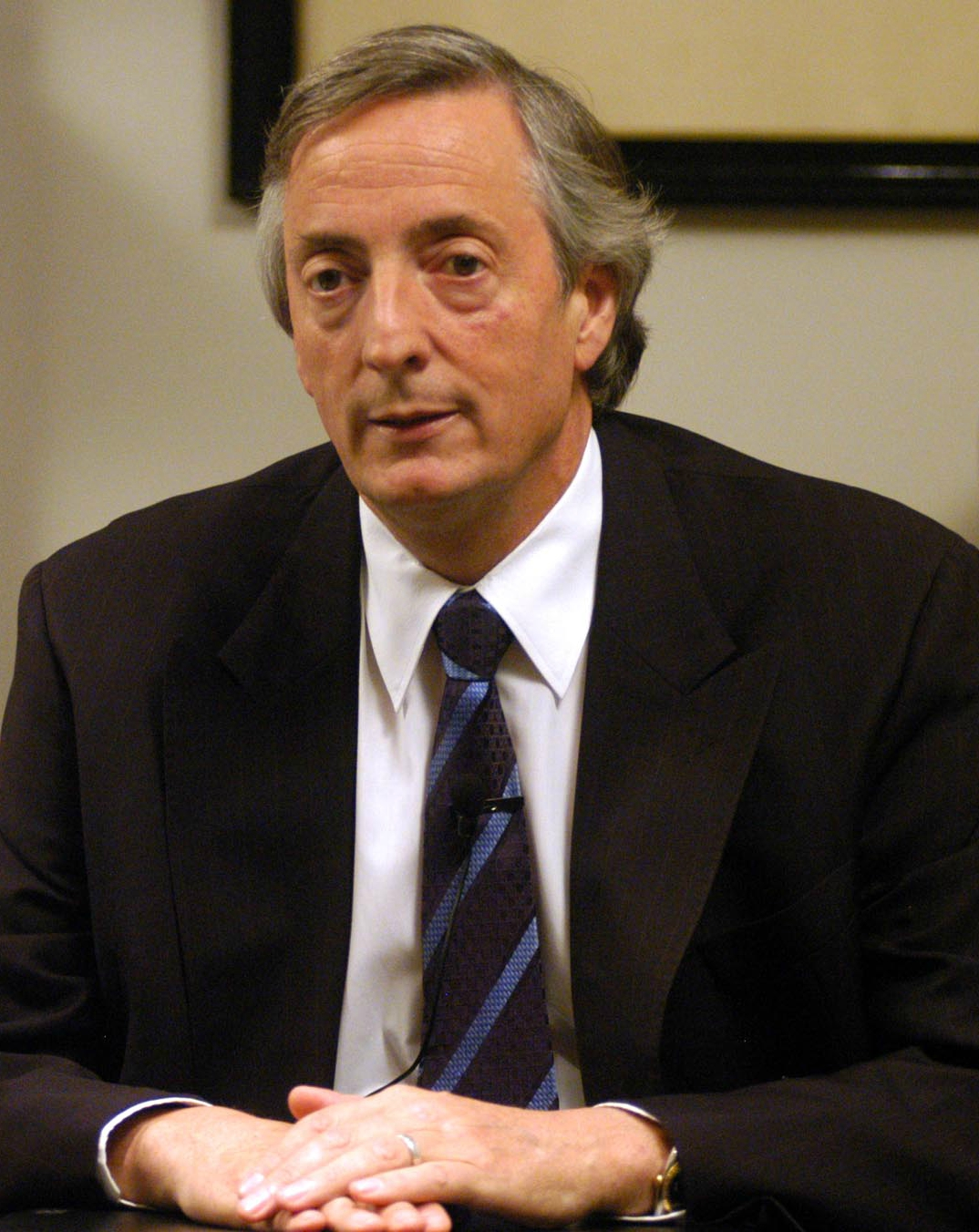
Néstor Kirchner served as President of Argentina from 2003 to 2007. His presidency marked the ideology called Kirchnerism.

President Néstor Kirchner took office on 25 May 2003. He reshuffled the leadership of the Armed Forces, overturned controversial amnesty laws that protected members of the 1976–1983 dictatorship from prosecution, and kept Lavagna on as economy minister for most of his presidency. Kirchner's administration saw a strong economic rebound, and foreign debt restructuring.

The Guardian compares Kirchner's economic policy with that of Franklin Roosevelt during the Great Depression. The Argentine president managed to revitalize a failed economy (21% unemployment, half the population below the poverty line and a 20% decline in GDP) by rejecting IMF injunctions, an economic policy that has allowed Argentina to advance on average growth of 8% per year and to lift 11 million people out of poverty.

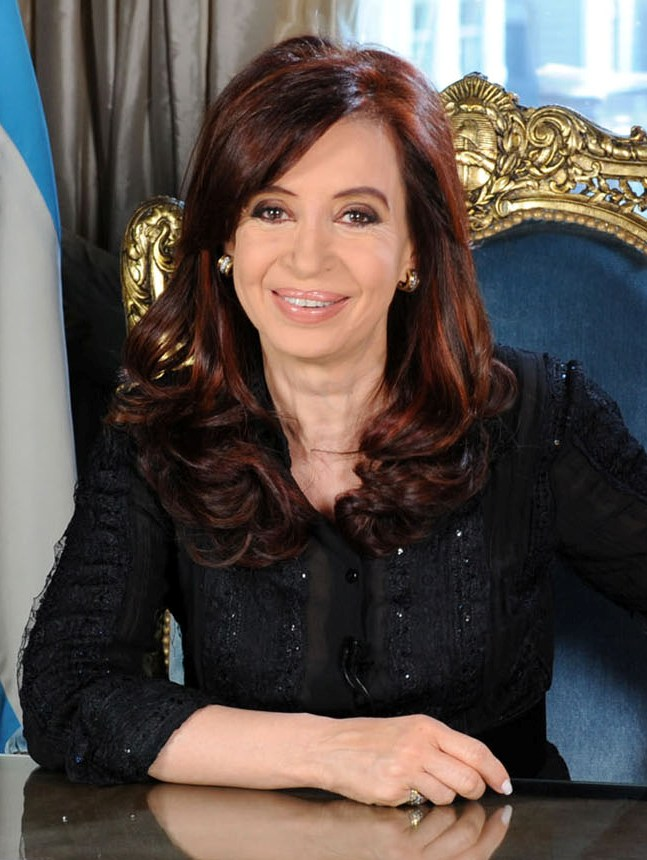
Cristina Fernández de Kirchner served as President of Argentina from 2007 to 2015.

On 28 October 2007, the 2007 general election took place in ten provinces and Fernández de Kirchner's Front for Victory won in six provinces. Hermes Binner was elected Governor of Santa Fe, becoming the first Socialist governor in Argentina's history and the first non-Peronist to rule the rather wealthy Santa Fe province, and center-left Fabiana Ríos of ARI, became the first woman to be elected governor of Tierra del Fuego, while the center-right Mauricio Macri was elected Chief of Government of Buenos Aires City in June 2007.

On 10 December 2007, then-First Lady and Senator Cristina Fernández de Kirchner took over the presidency from her husband, after winning elections with 44% of the vote. Her husband remained a highly influential politician during her term. The press developed the term "presidential marriage" to make reference to both of them at once. Some political analysts compared this type of government with a diarchy.

After proposing a new taxation system for agricultural exports Fernández de Kirchner's government had to face a severe lock out of the sector. The protest, which spread over 129 days, was quickly politicized and marked an inflection point in her administration. The system was finally rejected in the Senate by an opposing vote by the Vice President Julio Cobos.

The political style of the government changed in 2010 with the death of Néstor Kirchner. President Cristina Fernández de Kirchner slowly distanced herself from the traditional structure of the Justicialist Party and favored instead La Cámpora, a group of young supporters led by her eldest son Máximo Kirchner.

In the elections of 2011, President Cristina Fernández de Kirchner of the Front for Victory won via landslide by 54.11% of votes against Hermes Binner. Winning in the City of Buenos Aires and every province except San Luis (won by Federal Commitment candidate Alberto Rodríguez Saá), she became the first candidate to obtain an absolute majority of the popular vote since Raúl Alfonsín in 1983, and upon completion of ballot processing, the margin of victory (37.1%) exceeded Juan Perón's record 36% margin obtained in 1973. Fernández de Kirchner became the first woman re-elected as head of state in Latin American history.

=== Macri administration (2015–2019) ===
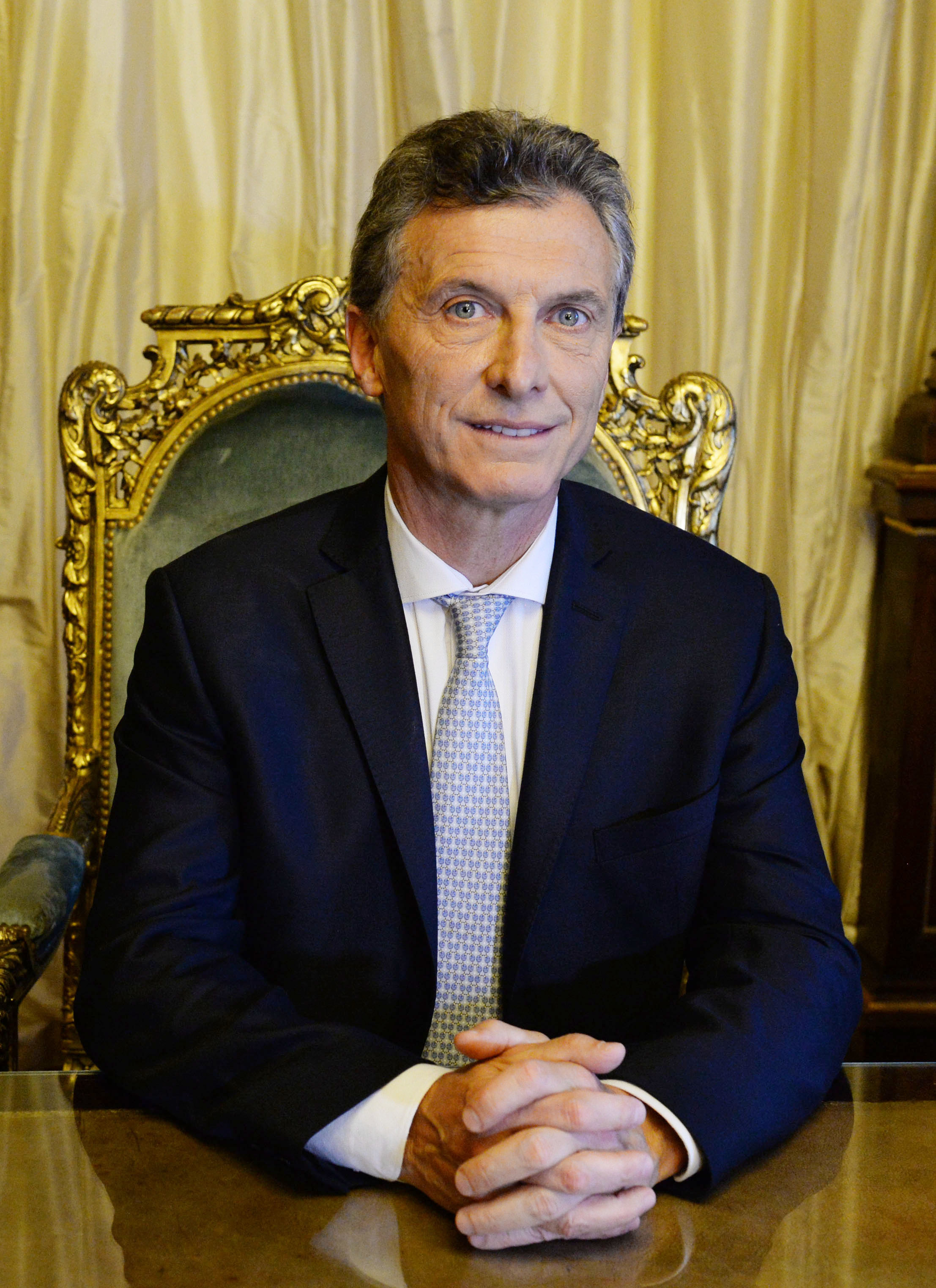
Mauricio Macri served as President of Argentina from 2015 to 2019.

On 22 November 2015, Buenos Aires Mayor Mauricio Macri won the presidency via ballotage, succeeding Cristina Fernández de Kirchner as president. As leader of the Republican Proposal (PRO) party, he won the presidency with an alliance known as Cambiemos (Let's Change), also integrated by the Civic Coalition ARI and the Radical Civic Union. Overcoming the former Buenos Aires Province Governor Daniel Scioli of Front for Victory. Macri took over as president on 10 December of that same year. His government changed direction from the previous era, moving back to neoliberal policies.

He was one of the political leaders identified in the scandalous Panama Papers where he was identified as having several offshore companies for which other leaders have used to evade taxes, though to the day he has not suffered any convictions.

=== Fernández administration (2019–2023) ===
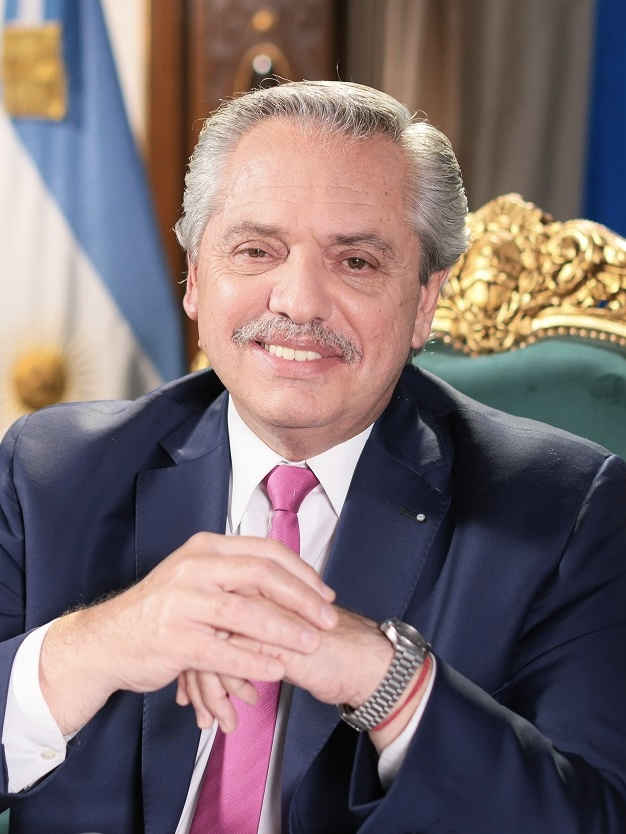
Alberto Fernández served as President of Argentina from 2019 to 2023.

On 10 December 2019, former Cabinet Chief Alberto Fernández of the Justicialist Party was inaugurated President, after defeating the incumbent Mauricio Macri in the 2019 Argentine general election.

On 14 November 2021, the center-left coalition of Argentina's ruling Peronist party, Frente de Todos (Front for Everyone), lost its majority in Congress, for the first time in almost 40 years, in midterm legislative elections. The election victory of the center-right coalition, Juntos por el Cambio (Together for Change), meant a tough final two years in office for President Alberto Fernández. Losing control of the Senate made it difficult for him to make key appointments, including to the judiciary. It also forced him to negotiate with the opposition every initiative he sent to the legislature.

In April 2023, President Alberto Fernández announced that he will not seek re-election in the next presidential election. The 19 November 2023 election run-off vote ended in a win for far-right outsider Javier Milei with close to 56% of the vote against 44% of the ruling coalition candidate Sergio Massa.

=== Milei administration (2023-present) ===
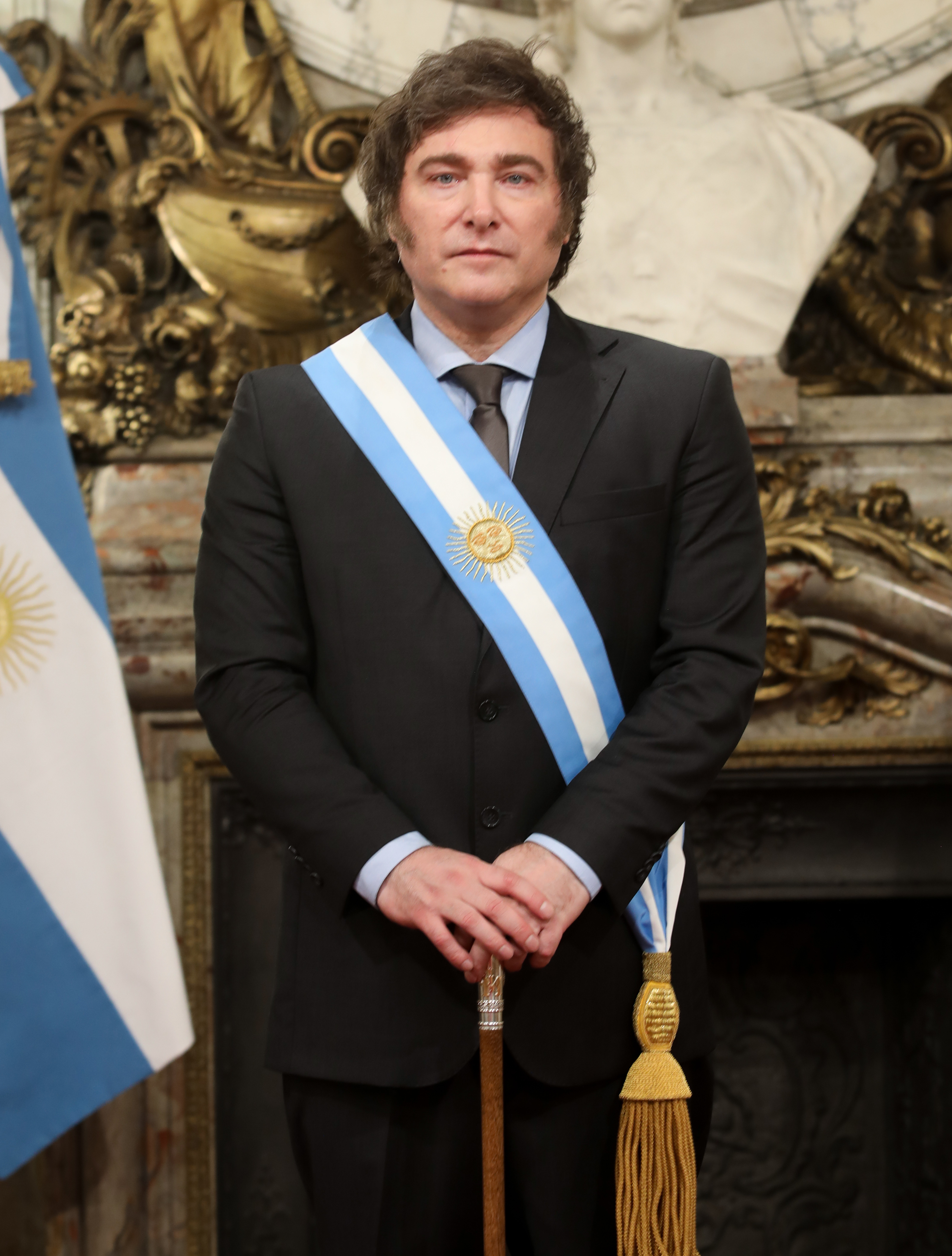
Javier Milei served as President of Argentina since 2023.

On 10 December 2023, Buenos Aires Deputy Javier Milei was sworn in as the new president of Argentina. At the time of Milei's inauguration, Argentina's economy was suffering 143 percent annual inflation, the currency had plunged and four out of 10 Argentines were in poverty.

Argentina had been set to join the BRICS bloc of developing economies on 1 January 2024. However, Argentina announced that it would not join the BRICS bloc, emphasizing Milei's preference for closer ties with the West.

In January 2024, Argentina's poverty rate reached 57.4% and then dropped to 49.9%, the highest poverty rates in the country since 2004.

In October 2025, President Javier Milei's party, La Libertad Avanza, won a landslide victory in midterm elections, making it easier for Milei to push ahead with his programme of radical spending cuts and free-market reforms.

== Current situation (2023 to present) ==
Javier Milei won Argentina's primaries with proposals described by BBC News Mundo as radical. His platform included eliminating the Central Bank and introducing currency competition that he expected to lead to dollarization, as well as reducing or eliminating some taxes and export duties. He also proposed labor reform without infringing existing rights and a “Plan motosierra” to cut state spending by ending public works and removing subsidies for transport, energy, and public services.

== See also ==
- Economic history of Argentina
- Afro-Argentines
- Historiography of Argentina
- History of Argentine nationality
- List of presidents of Argentina
- History of folkloric music in Argentina
- Politics of Argentina
- State-Church relations in Argentina

General:

- History of Latin America
- History of South America
- Latin America–United Kingdom relations
- Spanish colonization of the Americas

== Sources ==
- O'Donnell, Pacho (1998). El Aguila Guerrera: La Historia Argentina Que No Nos Contaron (in Spanish) (3rd ed.). Editorial Sudamericana. ISBN 978-9500714617.
