= Inauguration of Mauricio Macri =

Argentine presidential inauguration ceremony

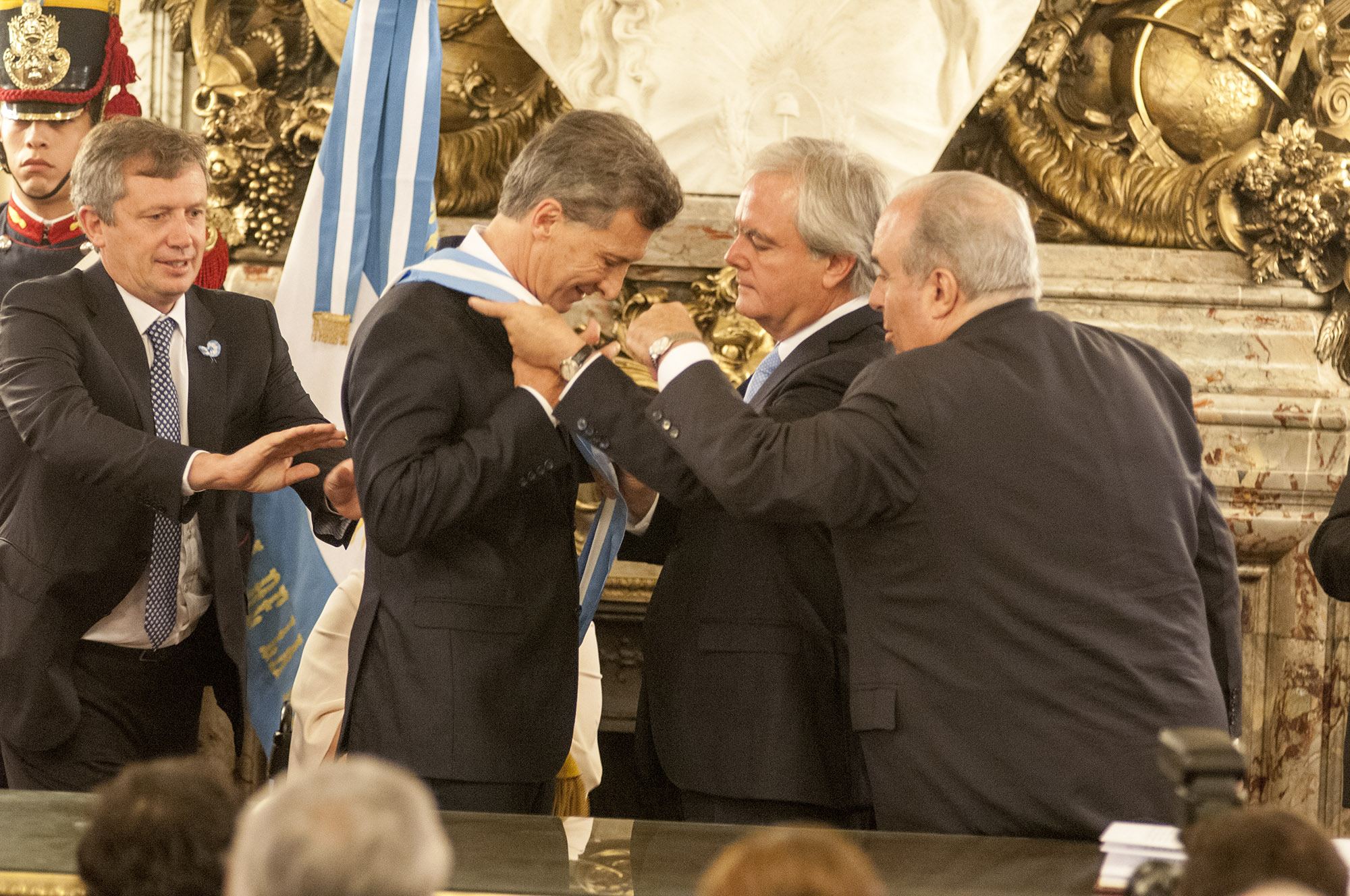
- Macri during his inauguration
- Date: 10 December 2015; 10 years ago
- Location: Palace of the Congress, Buenos Aires, Argentina
- Participants: Mauricio Macri (incoming); Gabriela Michetti (incoming); Cristina Fernández de Kirchner (outgoing); Amado Boudou (outgoing); International attendees

The inauguration of Mauricio Macri as the 57th president of Argentina took place on 10 December 2015. It followed a rocky presidential transition and a dispute over ceremonial protocol between outgoing president Cristina Fernández de Kirchner and president-elect Mauricio Macri.The event preceded the Kirchner's own inauguration on 10 December 2015 and succeeded by the Alberto Fernández' inauguration on 10 December 2019.

== Transition and controversy ==
Macri was elected president in the 2015 general elections, defeating Kirchnerist candidate Daniel Scioli. He met President Kirchner at the Quinta de Olivos a few days later. The meeting was focused on discussing the oath of office ceremony. In a part of that ceremony, the outgoing president hands the presidential sash and staff to the new president, as symbols of his presidential authority. Macri said that the meeting was pointless.

A few days later, it was announced that the whole ceremony would take place in the Argentine Congress, arguing that the Argentine Constitution orders that the oath of office must take place there. Macri agreed to make the oath of office in the Congress, but thought that he should then move to the Casa Rosada across the Avenida de Mayo and receive the sash and staff from Cristina at the White Hall, as was traditionally done. He argued that this was called for by presidential protocol. Kirchner allegedly wanted to fill the auditorium of the Congress with her sympathizers, who would jeer at Macri during the ceremony. Emilio Monzó, the incoming president of the Chamber of Deputies, said of the matter, "Historically inauguration day is when the people celebrate the incoming president, not the one who's leaving." The White Hall, a closed hall, had no space for crowds and was not suitable for that purpose. Additionally, Kirchner, in 2007 and 2011, and her late husband Néstor Kirchner in 2003, were sworn in and received the presidential sash and staff in Congress, as was Eduardo Duhalde, who was selected president in 2002 by Congress. Kirchner also associated the White Hall with presidents from Argentina's 1976–83 military dictatorship.

Cristina Kirchner proposed to hold the oath of office in the Congress, leave the sash and staff in there, and leave. This proposal was not accepted. Macri proposed that, if Kirchner refused to attend the ceremony at the Casa Rosada, he could receive the symbols from Ricardo Lorenzetti, president of the Supreme Court of Argentina. Macri and Kirchner talked by phone and attempted to come to an agreement, to no avail. Kirchner claimed that Macri was rude and violent with her, stating that at one point during the call, "I had to remind him that beyond our offices, he is a man and I am a woman, and I did not deserve to be treated as I was." She also went out of her way to remind Macri that "December 10 is not your birthday, but rather the day when you become the president of all Argentines in a democratic system." Incoming vice president Gabriela Michetti cast doubt on her remarks, noting that Macri is a person "whom we've never heard raising his tone of voice".

It was claimed that Kirchnerist organizations announced that they would take violent action against Macri supporters in the vicinity of the Plaza during the ceremony. While these rumors were officially denied within the government, with the security secretary stating that all necessary measures were being taken to prevent confrontations, and by Milagro Sala, leader of the Organización Barrial Túpac Amaru, the rumors led to another dispute, as it was unclear who would have command over the police during the event. Judge María Servini de Cubría ruled that Kirchner's term of office ceased at midnight on December 10. As a result, Federico Pinedo, the provisional president of the Senate, was in charge of the executive branch in the 12 hours between the end of Kirchner's term and Macri's swearing in. Kirchner left Buenos Aires in order to attend the inauguration of her sister-in-law Alicia Kirchner as governor of Santa Cruz Province, which took place the same day.

International reaction to the dispute was noteworthy. The Chilean newspaper La Tercera noted that the scandal brought into relief "the weakness of Argentina's institutions", while El Tiempo of Colombia wrote that the dispute developed "in a context of strong political conflict".

== Inauguration ==
Macri took office on 10 December 2015. He began the ceremony at his apartment in the neighborhood of Recoleta at the corner of Avenida del Libertador and Cavia at 11:00am. He moved to the National Congress of Argentina with his wife Juliana Awada and his youngest daughter. At 11:41 he entered the Legislature, taking the oath of office along with Vice President Gabriela Michetti. He then delivered a 27-minute address in which he pledged his support for an independent judiciary, the fight against corruption and drug trafficking, and universal social services. He also greeted his competitors during the presidential elections.

He then moved to the Casa Rosada, where he received the presidential sash and staff in the White Hall from acting president Pinedo, accompanied by Vice President Michetti, President of the Chamber of Deputies Emilio Monzó, and President of the Supreme Court Ricardo Lorenzetti. Also present were the former presidents Fernando de la Rúa, Ramón Puerta, Adolfo Rodríguez Saá, and Eduardo Duhalde. Minutes later, Macri delivered an address from the Casa Rosada's historic balcony to a crowd assembled in the Plaza de Mayo, promising to "always tell the truth, always be honest" and also calling on the public to aid him running the country and to let him know if he were to make a mistake.

After being declared president, he gave a reception at the San Martín Palace, the headquarters of the Ministry of Foreign Affairs and Worship, to all the heads of state present: Michelle Bachelet from Chile, Horacio Cartes from Paraguay, Juan Manuel Santos from Colombia, Rafael Correa from Ecuador, Evo Morales from Bolivia, Dilma Rousseff from Brazil, and representatives of other countries attending his inauguration. Juan Carlos I from Spain represented his home country and his son, Felipe VI.

=== Foreign attendees ===
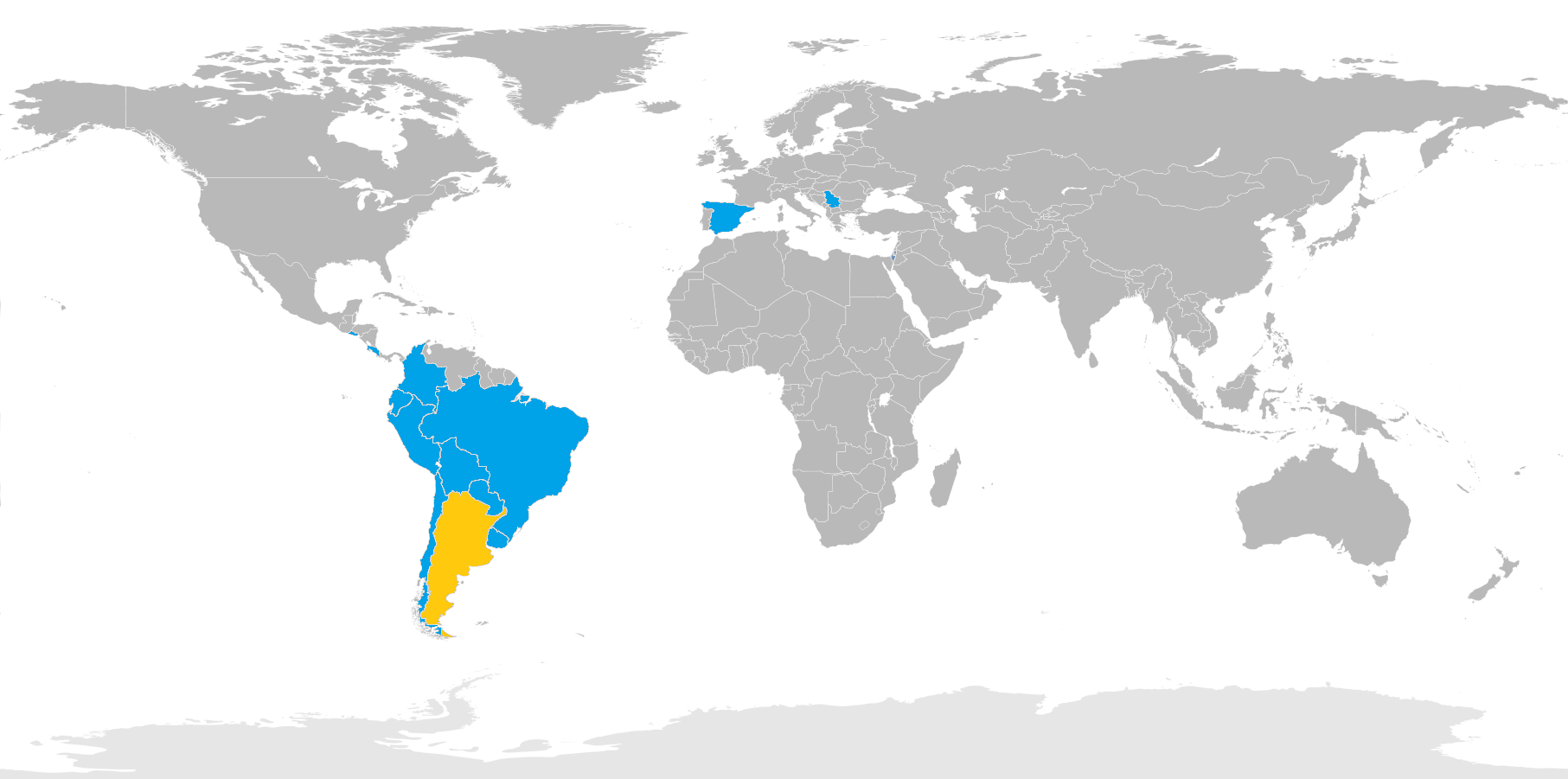
Foreign kings, presidents and vice-presidents who attended the ceremony.

- King Emeritus Juan Carlos I of Spain
- President Michelle Bachelet of Chile
- President Ollanta Humala of Peru
- President Juan Manuel Santos of Colombia
- President Rafael Correa of Ecuador
- President Evo Morales of Bolivia
- President Horacio Cartes of Paraguay
- President Tabaré Vázquez of Uruguay
- President Dilma Rousseff of Brazil
- President Tomislav Nikolic of Serbia
- Vice President Ana Helena Chacón Echeverria of Costa Rica
- Vice President Óscar Ortiz of El Salvador
- Ji Bingxuan, Vice Chairmen of the 12th Standing Committee of the National People's Congress of China
- Ex-President Christian Wulff of Germany
- Nikolai Patrushev, Secretary of the Security Council of Russia
- Andrés Navarro, Minister of Foreign Relations of Dominican Republic
- Claudia Ruiz Massieu, Secretary of Foreign Affairs of Mexico
- Ramtane Lamamra, Minister of Foreign Affairs of Algeria
- Riyad al-Maliki, Minister of Foreign Affairs of Palestine
- Maurizio Martina, Minister of Agricultural, Food and Forestry Policies of Italy
- Åsa Regnér, Minister for Children and the Elderly and Minister for Gender Equality of Sweden
- Miri Regev, Minister of Culture and Sport of Israel
- Milton Henríquez, Minister of Government of Panama
- Valdis Dombrovskis, Commissioner for Financial Stability, Financial Services and Capital Markets of the European Union
