= Inauguration of Alberto Fernández =

2019 Argentine presidential inauguration

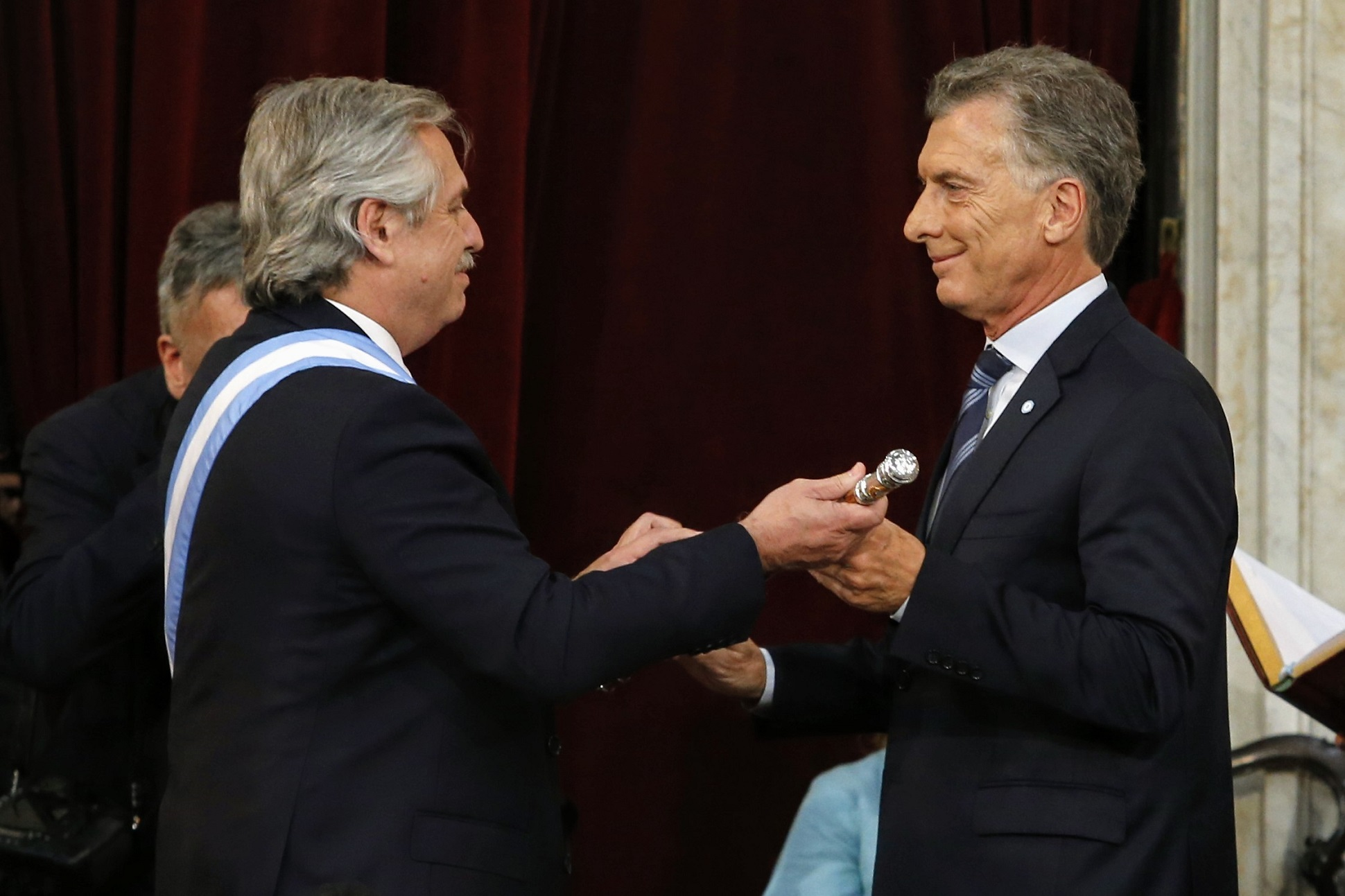
- Mauricio Macri handing over the presidential scepter to Alberto Fernández
- Date: 10 December 2019; 6 years ago
- Location: Palace of the Congress, Buenos Aires, Argentina
- Participants: Alberto Fernández (incoming); Cristina Fernández de Kirchner (incoming); Mauricio Macri (outgoing); Gabriela Michetti (outgoing); International attendees

The inauguration of Alberto Fernández as the 58th president of Argentina took place on 10 December 2019. Fernández wished for the bulk of the ceremony, including the concession of the presidential symbols, to take place in the Congressional Palace (as in the previous inaugurations of Néstor Kirchner and Cristina Fernández de Kirchner), rather than in the Casa Rosada, as it was the case in 2015. In the end the outgoing president, Mauricio Macri reluctantly approved. As planned, he was sworn in at the Chamber of Deputies Hall of the National Congress, before outgoing President Mauricio Macri, outgoing Vice President Gabriela Michetti and Vice President-elect Cristina Fernández de Kirchner, who also assumed as Vice President.

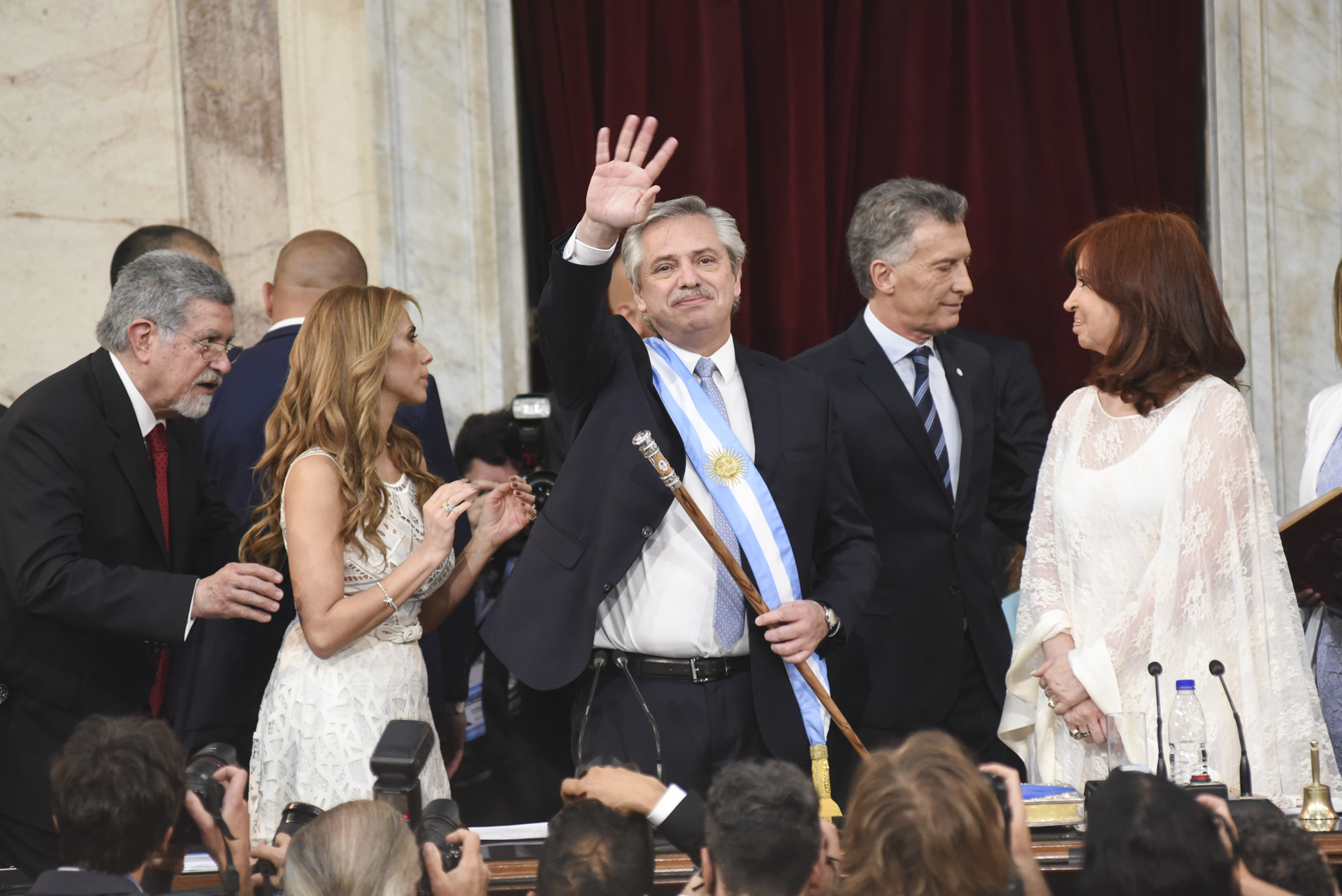
President Fernández (at the center, wearing a presidential sash and staff) with the Provisional President of the Senate Claudia Ledesma Abdala (left), former president and predecessor Mauricio Macri (right) and Vice President Cristina Fernández de Kirchner (beside Macri) at the Palace of the Argentine National Congress

During a 1 hour-long speech, President Alberto Fernández broadly described the state of affairs in Argentina and vowed to revive growth to escape from "virtual default". Once in the Casa Rosada, Fernández and Felipe Solá (Foreign Minister-designate), met with the international guests in the afternoon. Later in the afternoon, Fernández administered the oath of office to the ministers of the cabinet.

Prior to the inauguration, the fences in the Plaza de Mayo had been removed. Peronist sympathizers gathered around the Plaza de Mayo and the Congress to celebrate the presidential inauguration. In the former, a music festival took place throughout the afternoon. At the end, President Fernández spoke to the crowd gathered there. The event was preceded by the Macri's own inauguration on 10 December 2015 and succeeded by the Javier Milei's inauguration on 10 December 2023.

== International attendees ==
Attendees listed in the order in which they were received by Fernández and Solá.

=== Sovereign states ===
Country	Dignitary	Title
Paraguay	Mario Abdo Benítez	President
Uruguay	Tabaré Vázquez	President
Uruguay	Luis Lacalle Pou	President-elect
Cuba	Miguel Díaz Canel	President
Serbia	Ana Brnabić	Prime Minister
Suriname	Ashwin Adhin	Vice-President
Brazil	Hamilton Mourão	Vice-President
Venezuela	Jorge Rodríguez	Minister of the Popular Power for Communication and Information
Spain	Pilar Llop Cuenca	President of the Senate
Panama	Martín Torrijos Espino	Ex-president
China	Arken Imirbaki	Vice-Chair of the Standing Committee of the National People's Congress
Holy See	Martin Krebs	Nuncio to Uruguay
Peru	Vicente Zeballos Salinas	President of the Council of Ministers
Georgia	Natia Surava	Acting Head of the Presidential Administration
Sovereign Order of Malta	José María Coello de Portugal y Martínez del Peral	Member of the Council of Government
Qatar	Hamad Bin Abdulaziz Al-Kawari	Minister of State
Uruguay	Lucía Topolansky	Vice-President
Uruguay	José Mujica	Ex-President
Ecuador	Rafael Correa Delgado	Ex-President
Paraguay	Fernando Lugo	Ex-President
Brazil	Celso Amorim	Ex-Foreign Minister
Portugal	Augusto Santos Silva	Foreign Minister
Nicaragua	Denis Ronaldo Moncada Colindres	Foreign Minister
United States	Alex Azar II	Secretary of Health and Human Services
Colombia	José Manuel Restrepo Abondano	Minister of Commerce, Industry and Tourism
France	Roxana Maracineanu	Sports Minister
Mexico	Olga Sánchez Cordero	Secretary of the Interior
Netherlands	Winnie Sorgdrager	Minister of State
El Salvador	Ana Geraldine Béneke Castaneda	Foreign Vice-Minister
Ukraine	Sergiy Kyslytsya	Foreign Vice-Minister
Dominican Republic	Marjorie Espinosa	Foreign Vice-Minister
Italy	Ricardo Merlo	Under-Secretary of Foreign Affairs
Armenia	Grigor Hovhannissian	Foreign Vice-Minister
Chile	Carolina Valdivia Torres	Substitute Foreign Minister
United Kingdom	Gloria Dorothy Hooper, Baroness Hooper	Member of the House of Lords
Japan	Kozo Yamamoto	Member of Parliament
Canada	Rosa Galvez	Senator
Russia	Konstantin Kosachev	Senator

=== International organizations ===
Organization	Representative	Title
International Labour Organization	Guy Ryder	Director-General
Latin American Integration Association	Alejandro de la Peña Navarrete	Secretary-General
Inter American Institute for Cooperation in Agriculture	Manuel Otero	Director-General
Latin-American Energy Organization	Alfonso Blanco Bonilla	Secretary-General
Plata Basin Financial Development Fund	Juan Notaro Fraga	Executive President
UNECLAC	Alicia Bárcena Ibarra	Executive Secretary
Mercosur Parliament	Daniel Caggiani	President
Ibero-American General Secretariat	Rebeca Grynspan	Secretary-General
Antarctic Treaty Secretariat	Albert Lluberas	Executive Secretary
World Tourism Organization	Zurab Pololikashvili	Secretary General
ABACC	Elena Maceiras	Secretary-General
