= Alsogaray =

Alsogaray is a Basque surname. A branch of the family emigrated to South America in the early 19th century, and sustained a military tradition for several generations, beginning with Coronel Álvaro José Alsogaray's role in the 1845 Battle of Vuelta de Obligado. Some members of the Alsogaray family became famous in Argentina due to their involvement in critical events in Argentine history.

- Julio Alsogaray was a top-ranking police officer with a significant involvement in dismantling the Zwi Migdal prostitution ring in the early 20th century.
- Another Julio Alsogaray (1918–1994) was a top-ranking military officer, involved in the toppling of President Arturo Illia in 1966, following which he was named Chairman of the Joint Chiefs of Staff of the Argentine Armed Forces.
- Álvaro Alsogaray (1913–2005), the second Julio's brother, was from the 1950s until his death, the main advocate of free-market economics in Argentina. He established the Nueva Fuerza party in 1972 with little success, and later the Ucedé party in the 1980s, which attained better electoral results, and a large influence as the main voice calling for privatisation and deregulation of the then-stagnant Argentine economy.
- María Julia Alsogaray (1942–2017) was Álvaro's daughter. She entered politics in 1983 with Ucedé, and later became an influential member of the Menem administration, leading the successful privatisation of the ENTel phone company and as secretary of Natural Resources.
