= Bombardment of Mar del Plata =

Naval action during the Revolución Libertadora in Argentina

- Part of the Revolucion Libertadora
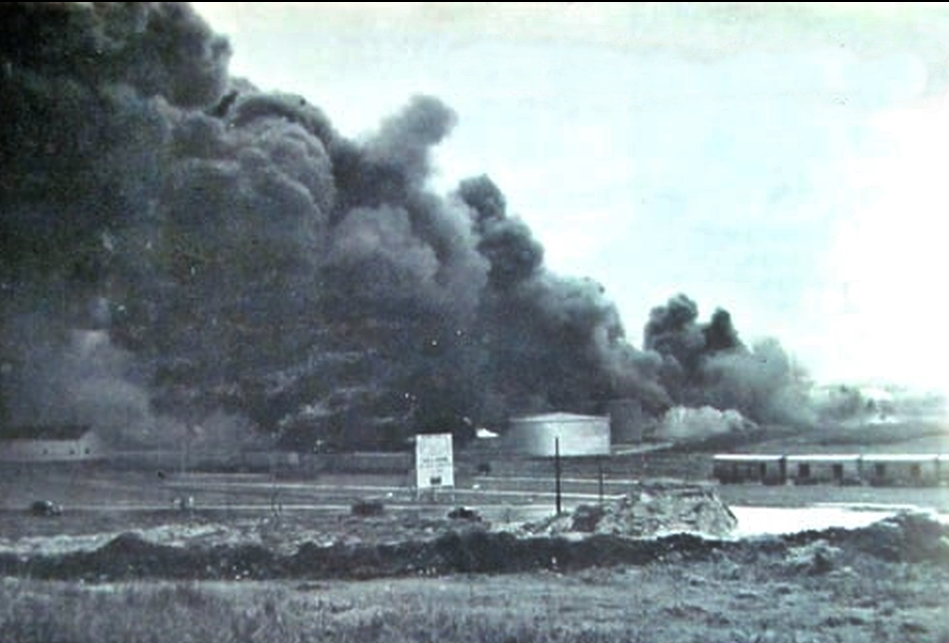
- Oil storage area at Mar del Plata’s port set ablaze after the shelling of the cruiser 9 de Julio
Date	19 September 1955
Location	Mar del Plata, Argentina 38°0′0″S 57°33′0″W
Result	Rebel victory

Belligerents
Central Government: Argentine Army; Peronist militants	Anti-Peronist rebels: Argentine Navy; Civilian activists

Commanders and leaders
Francisco Martos	Alberto de Marotte

Strength
1 anti-aircraft artillery battalion Armed civilians	1 light cruiser 4 destroyers 1 corvette 3 lanchas amarillas

Casualties and losses
1 dead 1 radar destroyed YPF fuel tanks destroyed	1 dead 1 lancha amarilla grounded

The Bombardment of Mar del Plata took place on 19 September 1955, when Argentine naval forces, led by the cruiser ARA 9 de Julio, along with four destroyers and a corvette, shelled multiple places around the city of Mar del Plata, Argentina, in the context of the Revolución Libertadora, a major uprising against the government of Juan Domigo Perón.

The targets included the port, the barracks of the army's Escuela de Artilleria Antiaérea (Antiaircraft Artillery School) and the surroundings of Mar del Plata's naval base, which was besieged by troops of the Argentine Army and armed civilians loyal to the government. Stray gunfire also damaged some civilian property around the port.

The naval action was conceived with the primary objective of destroying the fuel depots neighboring Mar del Plata's port, thereby seeking to impede the loyalist advance toward the Puerto Belgrano naval base. Nevertheless, the engagement resulted in the landing of rebel naval troops and the subsequent loyalist withdrawal, placing the city under rebel control. The majority of historians credit this event with Perón's decision to resign.

== Background ==
On September 16, 1955, a military rebellion against the government of Juan Domingo Perón broke out. The main center of the revolt was in the city of Córdoba, where the leader of the uprising, General Eduardo Lonardi, established his headquarters. The revolt in Córdoba was followed by one at the Puerto Belgrano Naval Base, resulting in the rebels gaining control of the Argentine naval fleet. There were other parts of the country where the armed forces spoke out against Perón, including Curuzú Cuatiá and Mendoza. The Argentine Fleet, at the time conducting exercises in Golfo Nuevo, off Puerto Madryn, was immediately directed by the rebel command to the Rio de la Plata to establish a naval blockade.

Shortly after taking notice that an army motorized column was moving toward Puerto Belgrano from the north via Mar del Plata, the navy's rebel command-in-chief, Admiral Isaac Rojas, understood that the column would refuel there. Since the fuel tanks were visible from the coast, the decision was made to destroy them using naval gunfire. This measure had been requested by Puerto Belgrano. Consequently, the ships still off the Atlantic coast—the cruiser 9 de Julio and a flotilla of destroyers —were assigned to the mission. At the same time, Puerto Belgrano was instructed to use long-range Catalina aircraft to bomb the oil deposits at Dock Sud, in Greater Buenos Aires , before 4:00 a.m. on Monday the 19th.

== Preliminary actions ==
At 17:11 on 18 September, an order was sent from the flagship ARA 17 de Octubre to the cruiser ARA 9 de Julio: "Destroy oil and fuel tanks in Mar del Plata, with prior warning to the population." Later, at 19:02, an order was sent to the destroyer Entre Ríos: "Destroyer Flotilla - destroy Mar del Plata's oil tanks and bomb Anti-Aircraft Regiment." Admiral Rojas fully trusted the mission's effectiveness, stating: "The cruiser had ample experience in this kind of operation because a short time before it had carried out a simulated firing exercise precisely on the tanks it now had to destroy."

The 9 de Julio and the four Buenos Aires-class destroyers (Buenos Aires, Entre Ríos, San Luis, and San Juan) had approached Mar del Plata from Puerto Belgrano. The mission immediately caused difficulties aboard the cruiser. Petty Officer Miguel Spera, who attempted to lead a mutiny and attacked an officer, was shot and killed by him at 22:30. Preventively, ten other crew members were arrested. No less serious was the refusal of the commander himself, Captain Bernardo Benesch, to fire on the fixed target. He manifested that “A revolution is not decided 400 km from the Capital", rejecting the order to open fire and preferring to confine himself to his cabin. Resolutely, his second-in-command, Commander Alberto de Marotte, assumed the command post.

To comply with the Admiral's directive, a warning was sent to Mar del Plata's submarine base at 21:15 that Sunday night: "By order of the Revolutionary Command, inform the population by all means that starting at dawn, positions held by troops opposing the movement will be bombarded, in addition to the Anti-Aircraft School and the port's oil tanks. Therefore, the waterfront areas, from Playa Grande to Playa Bristol, must be evacuated for a minimum depth of five blocks, as well as the vicinity of the other objectives. To avoid greater destruction I demand the immediate presentation aboard of the director of the Anti-Aircraft School and the commander of the Submarine Force."

An urgent message was relayed then from the destroyer Entre Ríos stating that if local radio stations did not broadcast the evacuation order before midnight, Mar del Plata's Naval Base itself would be included among the bombing targets. The message, drafted by Commander Aldo Abelardo Pantín, contained severe terms, particularly the demand to clear the first few blocks of buildings along the coast. This alarmed the Flotilla Commander, Captain Luis Mallea, who was aboard the same ship and challenged Pantín: Pantín later clarified that the harsh terms were just an outburst. However, the ultimatum regarding the naval base stemmed from the confusing and persistent silence of its commander, Captain Enrique Plater, which led the 9 de Julio's commander to request clarification from Puerto Belgrano. The cruiser's artillery chief, Commander Raúl Francos, suggested postponing the operation until dawn on Monday, September 19, to avoid civilian casualties, a course of action agreed upon by the new commander, Alberto De Marotte.

This postponement was communicated to the Destroyer Flotilla: "At dawn I will comply with the objective ordered by the Commander-in-Chief, bombing the fuel depots". Meanwhile, Captain Plater, the Base Commander, had been struggling to take sides since September 16, agreeing only to maintain a facade of loyalty to avoid conflict with the nearby Anti-Aircraft School in Camet. At a meeting, Commander Martín Gamenara of the corvette República suggested that the officers and some forces should board his ship and join the revolution. Plater decided to wait for the fleet's arrival for support, though Base and Submarine Force chiefs, distrusting Plater's resolve, considered arresting him, a plan they ultimately discarded. Their suspicion was justified, as Plater secretly spoke with Colonel Francisco Martos, head of the Anti-Aircraft Regiment, who sought to ensure his subordination to the authorities and requested the removal of the commander of the Submarine Force, Captain Carlos López, whom he deemed a dangerous element.

In a separate move, the submarine Santiago del Estero and the repair ship Ingeniero Gadda, both homeported in Mar del Plata, had already joined the uprising independently and sailed toward the Río de la Plata estuary to join Admiral Rojas's Squadron. The corvette República adopted a similar course, moving away from the pier but remaining anchored at the mouth of the port. On Sunday the 18th, as news of the approaching fleet spread, a meeting had been arranged aboard the República between Commander Plater and Captain Gamenara in the morning, but it failed once again to convince Plater of deposing his ambiguous position. That night Plater met Martos just outside the entrance of the submarine base and held talks with him regarding the safety of the civilians in case of attack, but Martos last word was that any resulting damage would be full responsibility of the Navy. Plater, who was accompanied by an aide, noticed the presence of armed civilians in the surroundings, as well as trucks blockading Juan B. Justo Avenue, one of the main approaches to the base. Early in the morning of the 19th, after a briefing with his officers, Plater was finally persuaded to join the rebellion and defend the base, deferring command to his executive officer, Corvette Captain Mario Peralta.

== Shelling of the port ==
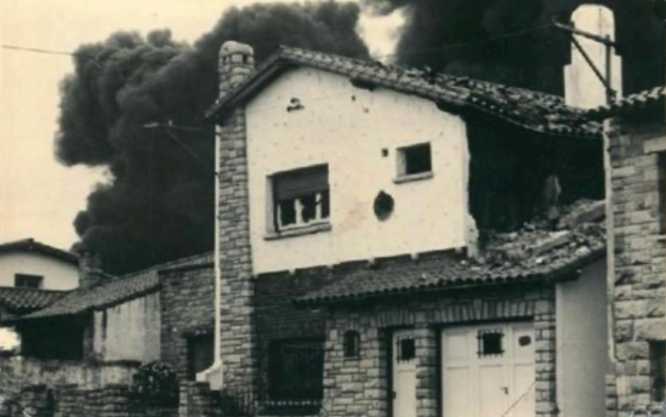
Mar del Plata style houses damaged by naval gunfire in the port's neighbourhood

On Monday, the 19th, starting at five o´clock in the morning, federal and provincial police officers gave house-to-house evacuation warnings from the La Perla neighborhood, in the northern part of the city, all the way to the port.

At 6:10 a.m. battle stations sounded aboard the 9 de Julio. Just as the cruiser was heading toward the coast, an unexpected presence provided a pause, granting time for the Naval Base to complete evacuation preparations. This was a call from a Martin Mariner flying boat requesting permission to bomb the same target because it had to return to Puerto Belgrano after a failed raid on Dock Sud. This plane had been dispatched to replace the two Catalina aircraft originally ordered to attack Dock Sud, a mission they could not complete due to a prevailing storm.

The cruiser granted permission, and the naval aircraft dropped its payload near the fuel depots, in the port's quarry area. The antiaircraft guns of the army opened fire, to no avail. Although the bombs caused no damage, it served as an eloquent announcement, urging the civilian population to evacuate the area. Poor weather, marked by rain and heavy seas, caused the ships to roll. Since it was still dark, the vessels communicated visually using Aldis lamps to agree on a firing sequence: the 9 de Julio would attack first, followed by the destroyers.

Instructions began to circulate between the cruiser's bridge and the combat information center. In the fire control room, Commander Francos, the artillery chief, was ready to give the order to the ship's five turrets, each armed with three 6-inch guns. They were prepared to use six-inch shells to carry out the bombardment.

9 de Julio opened up at 7:15 a.m. The first broadside, used to fix the range, landed along the shore. The following salvoes struck home, exception made of some stray rounds that fell on a nearby quarry. The fire was directed by a spotter inside the naval base. The operation commenced with a calibrating salvo, aimed low, followed by four more salvos, increasing to full turret fire. The target was hit quickly by the second broadside, causing immediate explosions in two or three fuel tanks.

A brief cease-fire at 7:19 allowed for damage assessment, but shelling was resumed upon spotting undamaged tanks. Three more salvos hit the depots, producing dense smoke and flames. The final order was given at 7:23 from 9,700 yards, concluding the ten-minute engagement.

The bombardment was highly accurate and consumed 68 projectiles. Nine of the eleven depots were destroyed, one was intact, and one was slightly damaged. The accuracy and the prior evacuation prevented casualties. The ship remained nearby to offer anti-aircraft protection for the destroyers entering action.

Most people in Mar del Plata port's neighbourhood had dismissed the warning or had not been alerted of the incoming attack; therefore, hundreds of families abandoned their houses by their own means. The majority of the population was people of Italian descent or outright Italian immigrants; those who witnessed World War II downplayed the situation, putting the current events in perspective with the scale of what they had lived through. Several civilian houses were damaged by stray artillery rounds from the destroyers, that joined the action some time later.

== Battle for the naval base ==
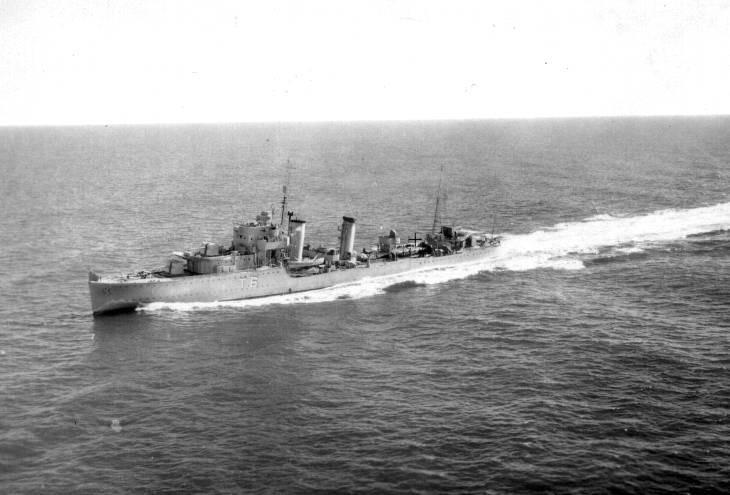
Destroyer ARA Buenos Aires

Both Army troops, equipped with Bofors 40 mm anti-aircraft guns, and armed civilians loyal to the government were stationed on the hills of the Mar del Plata Golf Club, from where they had a panoramic view of the naval base. de Marotte ordered the destroyer Buenos Aires and the corvette República to open fire on the attackers, who were dispersed by 9:30 a.m., after two hours of shelling. The San Luis and the Entre Ríos joined the shooting at some point. At the same time, the commander of the rebel force decided the evacuation of the base on three requisitioned fishing boats (known locally as lanchas amarillas). The base had a small grass airstrip and a control tower, from where a naval spotter directed the destroyers' gunfire. A number of stranded rounds from the first salvo hit civilian property at Juan B. Justo Avenue and in the port's neighbourhood resulted in a number of injured people. A second salvo landed among the antiaircraft guns and five army trucks deployed near the Golf Club. An errant round blew a nearby horse to pieces.

A group of civilian snipers who had slipped into the northern wharf of the port harassed the boats with rifle and machine gun fire when these were about to reach open sea; one of the destroyers neutralized the threat with her main guns. One of the launches carrying the personnel, the El Corsario, became stranded and ran aground on the rocks amid the crossfire. The seamen were rescued by another fishing boat, the Miguel Ángel. The El Corsario was recovered one week later and was still active within the local fishing fleet in 1959.

From a nearby hill in Playa Grande, a group of civilian sympathizers roared their approval as the destroyers unleashed their firepower on the loyalist forces. It was at this point that Miguel Ángel Rabini, a non-commissioned officer of the base who voluntary remained behind, took his own life in unclear circumstances. Shortly after the initial events, the commander of the Destroyer Flotilla, Captain Luis Mallea, received a message (via the Naval Base) from the Uruguayan Consul in Mar del Plata stating that the local Army and Air Force garrisons were willing to surrender to the navy.

However, Captain Mallea did not trust the announcement, as Captain Peralta, in charge of the submarine base, warned him the surrender might be a trap and that the army could be moving artillery from Tandil. Indeed, an evacuation warning was issue to the neighbours of Mar del Plata's railway station in the belief that a major confrontation in the area was imminent. Consequently, Mallea demanded that the commanders of the anti-aircraft regiment and the Air Force detachment personally report to him. When the loyalist commanders had not presented themselves by 10:30, Captain Mallea issued a final 30-minute ultimatum. He threatened to bombard the Army Regiment's installations in Camet if they failed to comply, following instructions from Admiral Rojas.

== Shelling of the Army barracks ==
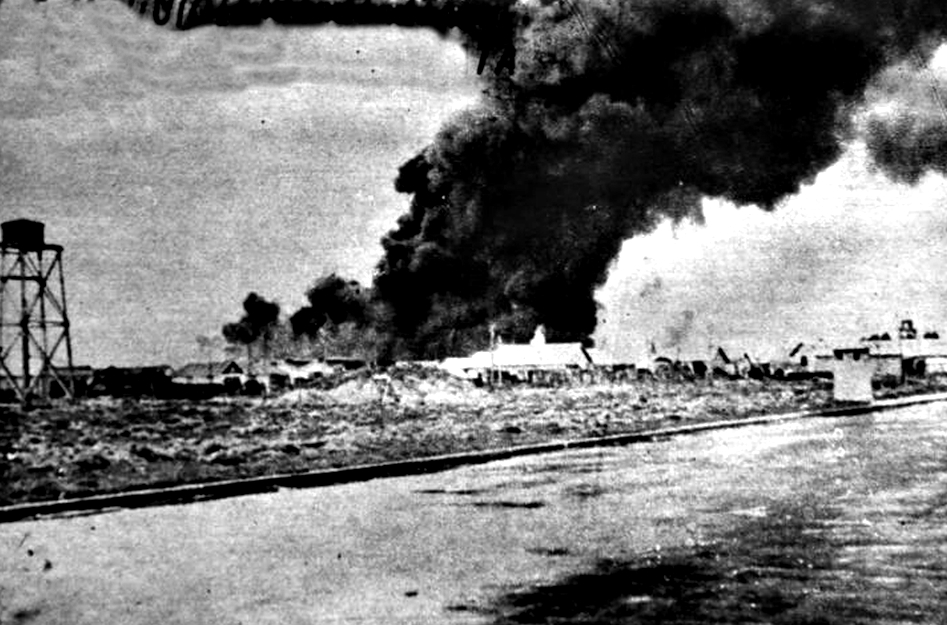
Barracks of the Antiaircraft Artillery School under fire, 19 September 1955

The remaining three destroyers were positioned in the coast north of the city, some miles east of the town of Camet. At 11:00 a.m., they opened fire on the military installations from an approximate distance of 6,000 meters, supported by the corvette República.

The designated targets were: the radar tower for the Entre Ríos, the water tower for the San Juan, the radar antenna for the República (also located on a water tank), and the San Luis added its fire to the antenna target as it had no specific instruction. These targets were difficult to destroy, and the shells fell in surrounding areas. However, according to American historian Robert A. Potash, the unit's state-of-the-art Westinghouse radar was destroyed. A total of about 175 projectiles were expended during the engagement. By the time the first rounds hit home, the full garrison had been evacuated to the countryside.

Local historian and journalist Roberto Barili, situated on the coast near the Unzué Asylum, was an eyewitness to the naval bombardment of the Anti-Aircraft Artillery School barracks. The author recalls having seen the flashes of the destroyers and the corvette salvos in the distance behind the fog.

There was a last-ditch attempt against the naval base carried out by the armed civilians, but once again the firepower of the destroyers forced them to withdraw, while at the same time five officers and 120 seamen landed in the base from the fishing boats, taking control of the facilities.

== Aftermath ==
Juan Domingo Perón offered his resignation on 20 September; it is widely claimed that the decision was taken after the bombardment of Mar del Plata. Groups of civilian sympathizers with the uprising looted and set on fire the summer houses of people affiliated with Peron's government, such as the army's commander in chief General Franklin Lucero and the businessman Jorge Antonio, as well as the local chapters of the Peronist Party and unions loyal to Perón. The next day, 20 September, there was still some skirmishes with the armed civilians that attacked the naval base; the most notable took place in the corner of Luro and Independencia avenues, where a jeep of the navy mounting a heavy machine gun opened fire on an apartment occupied by Peron's sympathizers. The number of casualties, if any, was never revealed, though the press of the time reported four wounded in other incidents. Both workers affiliated with the local Socialist Party and the local middle class celebrated the fall of the regime.

== See also ==
- Bombing of Plaza de Mayo
- 1963 Argentine Navy revolt
