= 1963 Argentine Navy revolt =

Argentine armed confrontation

- Part of the Cold War
- Collection of images during the conflict.
Date	18 September 1962 – 7 April 1963
Location	Argentina
Action	Final Colorados (Reds) faction of the Argentine Armed Forces uprising against the Azules (Blues) faction.
Result	Azules victory: Revolt suppressed; Loss of political influence of the Argentine Navy; Prelude to the 1966 coup d'état

Government-Insurgents
Azules faction (most of the Army and the Air Force)	Colorados faction (mainly the Navy)

Commanders and leaders
Juan Carlos Onganía; Osiris Villegas; Julio Rodolfo Alsogaray; Alejandro Agustín Lanusse; Alcides López Aufranc; Tomás Sánchez de Bustamante	Isaac Rojas; Federico Toranzo Montero; Santiago Sabarots; Juan Carlos Lorio; Armando P. Martijena; Bernardino Labayru; José María Díaz; Benjamin Menendez; Arturo Rial; Carlos Sanchez Sanudo; Osvaldo Lentino; Jorge Rafael Videla; Roberto Eduardo Viola

Military support
Most of the Argentine Armed Forces	Part of the Argentine Armed Forces

Casualties and losses
19 dead 22 wounded Several vehicles destroyed	At least 12 dead 46 wounded 24 aircraft destroyed (mostly on the ground)
- Unknown overall casualties

The 1963 Argentine Navy revolt, also known as Azules y Colorados (Blues and Colorados), was an armed confrontation between elements of the Argentine military that lasted from 18 September 1962 to 7 April 1963. The revolt was attempted by military officers who wanted the government to take a hardline stance against the political participation of Peronist politicians, the culmination of the conflict between Azules and Colorados. The revolt failed to gain much support in the Army and Air Force, and these two branches suppressed the uprising after some fighting that left 24 dead on both sides. The Argentine elections of 1963 proceeded as planned in July and the Navy saw a reduction of its influence.

== Background ==
In 1955, the once popular government of Juan Peron was overthrown in a military coup known as the Revolución Libertadora. The subsequent military-backed government banned the participation of Peronist politicians. However, divisions grew within the military between the so-called Azules (Blues), who favored allowing a limited degree of participation by Peronist candidates so as to preserve a veneer of legality, and the Colorados (Reds), who took a hardline stance against them and other left-wing groups and were in favor of a complete military take over.

In 1962, President Arturo Frondizi was forced to step down as a result of Peronist electoral victories in local elections, and was replaced by José María Guido who reinstituted the ban on openly Peronist candidates. However, the Azules faction, led by Army General Juan Carlos Onganía, agreed to hold presidential elections in 1963 that permitted former-Peronist candidates.

An attempted coup by the Colorados on 21 September 1962 was suppressed following an aerial bombardment in San Antonio de Padua, and many participating officers were forced to retire or demoted. Sporadic clashes were extended for the next six months.

== Conspiracy ==
Early in 1963, high-ranking officers from all three branches of Argentina's military agreed to attempt a coup to prevent the election from occurring that July, including Admiral Isaac Rojas (a former vice president), General Benjamin Menendez, General Federico Toranzo Montero, Admiral Arturo Rial, Admiral Carlos Sanchez Sanudo, and Air Force Commodore Osvaldo Lentino. This conspiracy committed on March 24, 1963, to attempt a coup, and outlined in a 16-page 'Doctrina de Gobierno' (doctrine of government), their plan for the governance of Argentina, whose terms included the institution of liberal economic policies, bureaucratic decentralization, anti-communism, and the suppression of labor unions and university students. The conspirators agreed to launch the coup on 2 April and went about recruiting officers to their cause.

== The April revolt ==
On the day of the coup, the commanders of Argentina's key naval bases (including 68 active-duty officers) declared their support for the coup, including those of Puerto Belgrano, Mar Del Plata, Rio Santiago Shipyard and Punta Indio. The Naval Headquarters and Navy Mechanics School, as well as a radio station in Buenos Aires were immediately seized. Around Puerto Belgrano, base commander Admiral Jorge Palma used the threat of the numerically superior marine force under his command to compel the surrender of the Army's 5th Infantry Regiment.

Support in the Air Force for the coup was limited to 13 active-duty officers in the bases at Aeroparque, Reconquista, and Mar del Plata, all of which swiftly fell back into loyalist control. The rebel-held radio station in Buenos Aires was promptly bombed by loyalist MS.760 aircraft.

At least 129 active-duty Army officers also expressed support for the coup, including the commanders of several large units, but the majority of them were stationed far from the capital, and all of the rebel army units surrendered within two days. Loyal army troops stationed in Campo de Mayo were quickly mobilized to seize the radio station, Naval Headquarters, and Aeroparque in Buenos Aires. The leaders of the revolt, accompanied by marine infantry, fled by ship to Puerto Belgrano. On 3 April, Army units moved onto retake the naval installations at La Plata and Rio Santiago, whose personnel had also fled to Puerto Belgrano.

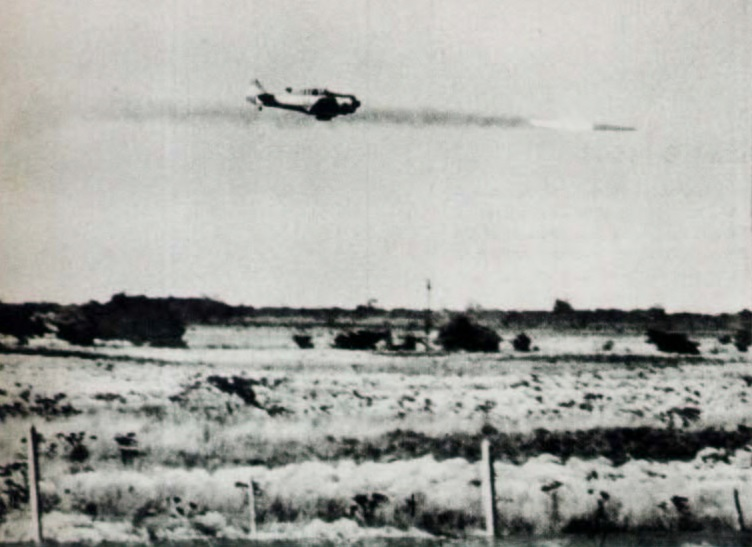
A rebel AT-6 combat trainer attacks a column of vehicles

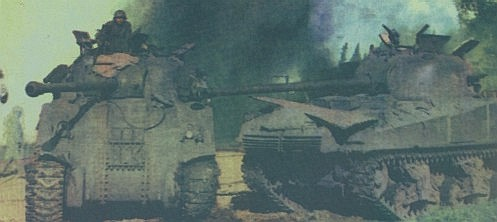
A disabled Sherman tank in Florencio Varela (22 September 1962)

At 8 am on 3 April, the Air Force retaliated. A squad of F-86 Sabres, Gloster Meteors and MS.760s launched air strikes against the naval base, destroying five Navy aircraft on the ground. The 8th Tank Regiment subsequently occupied Punta Indio only to find it abandoned, its personnel having fled to Uruguay, leaving behind five seamen and four wounded.

=== Surrender of the revolt ===
Meanwhile, the army had encircled the remaining rebel stronghold of Puerto Belgrano with rapidly mobilized troops from the 6th Mountain Infantry Division. Wishing to avoid a civil war, Admiral Palma offered to surrender and bring an end to hostilities under the condition that Puerto Belgrano not be occupied and that the Navy be allowed to keep its Marine and Aviation branches. This was agreed to by the Secretaries of the Army and Air Force, and the newly appointed secretary of the navy, Admiral Eladio Vazquez (former commander of the Sea Fleet, who had not declared his support for the coup), and President Guido. However, General Juan Carlos Onganía initially refused to call off the troops attacking Puerto Belgrano, and was only persuaded to submit to civilian rule following a personal conference with President Guido.

== Aftermath ==
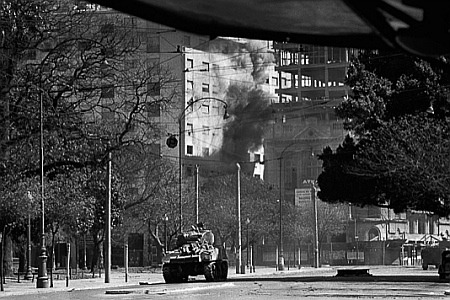
Azules (Blues) Sherman tanks.

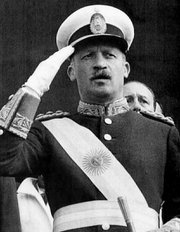
General Juan Carlos Onganía, the leader of the Azules faction.

The final terms of the agreement ending the rebellion were reached on 5 April. The Navy was forced to limit the size of the Marines to just 2,500 troops dispersed among various naval bases, and its naval air installation at Punta Indio was occupied by Army troops. All officers implicated in the revolt were stood trial. A total of 19 Army soldiers and five Navy marines were killed in the revolt, and a further 87 men were wounded.

Two hundred ninety two officers in the Argentine military were indicted following the agreement, of which 80 fled prosecution and 73 were found not guilty or had proceedings dropped; the remainder suffered sentences ranging from 6 months to 9 years in jail, and possible loss of military status. Later that year, on 12 September 1963, President Guido granted amnesty to all those indicted as a result of the coup.

The Argentine elections of 1963 proceeded on schedule on 7 July and, as a result of divisions in both the ruling party and the Peronists (many of whom cast blank votes), saw the victory of the centrist Arturo Umberto Illia. Arturo Illia proceeded to legalize the political participation of Peronists; nevertheless, he would be overthrown by General Juan Carlos Onganía in the 1966 Argentine Revolution, which instituted a lasting period of military-led dictatorships and violent political oppression culminating in the Dirty War of the mid-1970s.

== Political views ==
=== Colorados ===
The Colorados advocated for economic liberalism and anti-communism.

=== Azules ===
Azules members like Juan Carlos Onganía embraced corporatism. After the 1966 Argentine coup d'état Azuemes member Juan Carlos Onganía adopted developmentalism and dirigisme during his reign. some members of the military dictatorship however also embraced national liberalism and economic liberalism.

== See also ==
- Bombing of Plaza de Mayo
- Bombardment of Mar del Plata
