= General Menéndez =

General Menéndez may refer to:

- Benjamín Menéndez (1885–1975), Argentine Army brigadier general
- Leopoldo Menéndez (1891–1965), Spanish Republican Army general
- Luciano Benjamín Menéndez (1927–2018), Argentine Army general
- Mario Benjamín Menéndez (1930–2015), Argentine Army brigadier general
