= List of submarines of Submarine Force Command =

Submarine Force Command
- Comando de la Fuerza de Submarinos
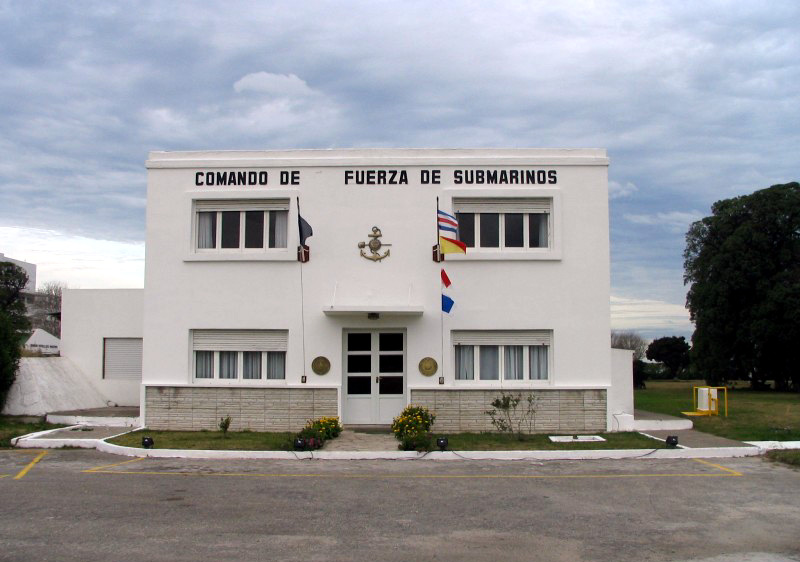
- Comando de la Fuerza de Submarinos (COFS) building, Mar del Plata
- Active: 1927 – present
- Country: Argentina
- Branch: Argentine Navy
- Type: Submarines
- Size: None active
- Part of: Navy; Ministry of Defense
- Anniversaries: September 3
- Engagements: Revolucion Libertadora; Falklands War
- Website: argentina.gob.ar/submarinos

Commanders
- Commander-in-Chief: President of the Republic
- Chief of Staff of the Navy: Admiral
- Chief of COFS: Capitán de Navío

The Argentine Submarine Force Command (Spanish: Comando de la Fuerza de Submarinos, COFS) is the submarine service branch of the Argentine Navy.

Argentine submarines were traditionally named after the provinces of the Republic whose name begins with the letter 'S'; they are home based at Mar del Plata Naval Base. COFS members have the same rank insignia and titles as the rest of the Navy. As of 2010, the elite group Agrupación de Buzos Tácticos was under the direct command of the submarine force.

As of 2023, since 2020 the Submarine Force Command has had two submarines, both inactive. Following the disappearance of ARA San Juan in November 2017, one TR-1700 (ARA Santa Cruz (S-41)) and one Type 209 (ARA Salta (S-31)) submarines remain on the naval list, though neither is operational. Two small surface vessels, ARA Punta Mogotes (P-65) and ARA Luisito (Q-51), are also part of the COFS and used in a training role.

== History ==
In 1917 the Argentine Navy sent students to the United States to begin training courses at the Naval Submarine Base New London. Lieutenants Francis Lajous, Osvaldo Repeto, Eduardo Ceballos and Vicente Ferrer served in the United States Navy during the First World War.

Like the rest of the Argentine armed services, the submarine force struggled to maintain its readiness due to budget constraints affecting equipment maintenance and personnel training. In 2012, the three boats then in service had maintenance difficulties and between them spent just 19 hours submerged.

In mid-2019, the governments of Brazil and Argentina began working on a transfer deal for the four Tupi IKL209/1400 submarines then operated by the Brazilian Navy. In the early 2000s the Tupis were upgraded with new combat systems by Lockheed Martin Maritime Systems and Sensors. This gave the submarines the ability to carry and fire the Mk 48 Mod 6AT ADCAPTorpedo. Defence ministers and admirals of the Argentine Navy were enthusiastic about moving forward with the arrangement. The submarines were to be repaired and serviced in the Tandanor drydock facility. The acquisition would rejuvenate the Argentine submarine force and its strategic position in the South Atlantic.

In January 2020, while touring the Mar del Plata naval base, Defence Minister Augustin Rossi indicated that he would like the submarine capability provided by ARA Santa Cruz not to be lost, as it was the last submarine then still active in Argentine service. However, by the end of 2020, the refit of Santa Cruz was reported cancelled leaving the entire Argentine submarine service inactive. The submarine service was then relying on international exchanges to permit personnel to serve in foreign submarines (notably with the Peruvian Navy) and was using the submarine Salta as a training platform at dockside.

=== First generation ===
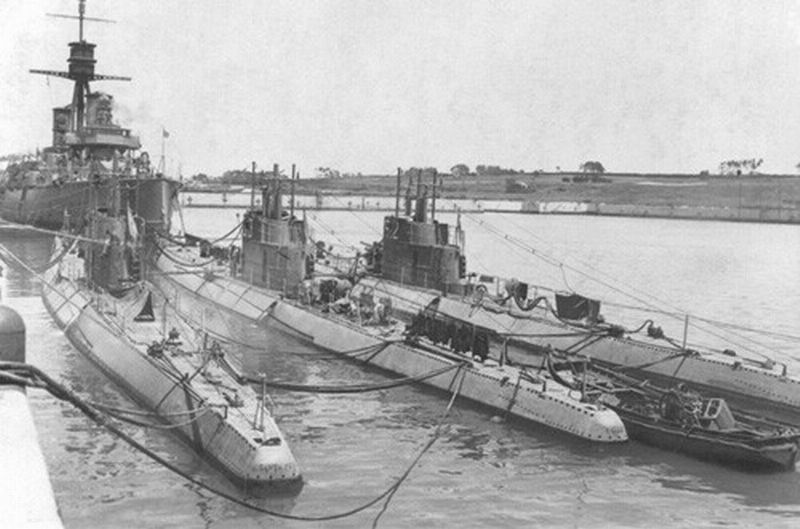
First Argentine submarines Santa Fe class and the submarine tender General Belgrano at Mar del Plata naval base

In 1927 the Argentine Navy signed a contract with the Italian shipyard Franco Tosi of Taranto in order to build the service's first three ships. The units arrived in Buenos Aires on 7 April 1933, and transferred to Mar del Plata on 3 September, which became the Anniversary Day for the newly created Submarine Force. The Tarantinos, as they were known, served between 1933 and 1960 when the last one, Santa Fe (S-1), was retired after taking over a thousand dives. In 1938, the crew of Santa Fe had been awarded a civilian medal after assisting a local fishing boat that was in distress off Cabo Corrientes. Santiago del Estero (S-2) established (at the time) an immersion record for a submarine in the South Atlantic (114 metres (374 ft)). Santiago del Estero took part in the blockade of the Rio de la Plata during the 1955 Revolución Libertadora, where she fought off a strike package of Gloster Meteor fighter aircraft loyal to president Juan Domingo Peron.

- ARA Santa Fe (S-1)
- ARA Santiago del Estero (S-2)
- ARA Salta (S-3)

=== Second generation ===
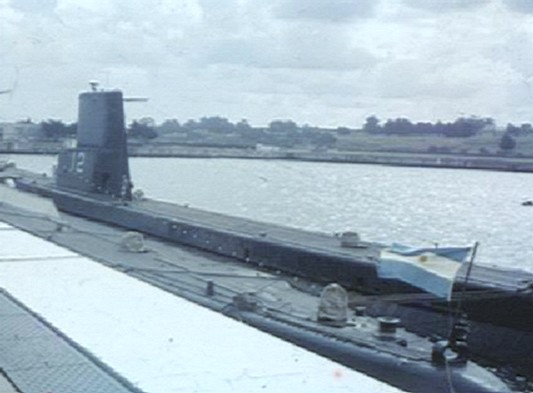
ARA Santiago del Estero (S-12) after being upgraded in Mar del Plata

In April 1960 the United States Navy agreed to transfer two Balao-class submarine units on loan under the Military Assistance Program. They departed from San Francisco, California, on September 23 and arrived in Mar del Plata on November 30. These ships participated in numerous exercises during their career including UNITAS, CAIMAN, SAYONARA and CAIO DULIO. The conning towers of both submarines were locally upgraded to improve hydrodynamics. In 1996, Argentinian officials disclosed that a group of tactical divers had carried out an incursion on the Falkland Islands on board Santiago del Estero (S-12) in October 1966. The submarines went back to the United States for mid-life repairs and were retired in 1971.

- ARA Santa Fe (S-11), ex USS Macabi (SS-375)
- ARA Santiago del Estero (S-12), ex USS Lamprey (SS-372)

=== Third generation ===
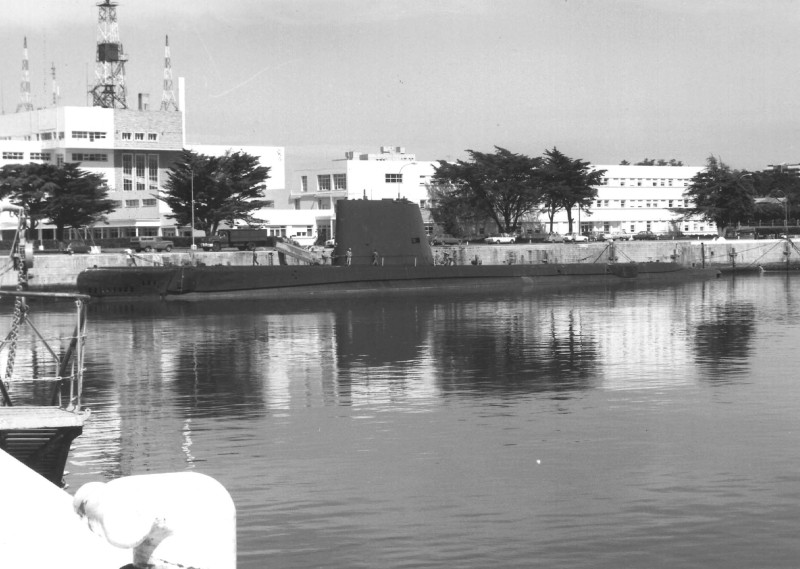
ARA Santiago del Estero (S-22)

In 1971 the US Navy transferred further units in order to replace the previous generation. Two GUPPY-type submarines were an interim measure until new submarines being built in Europe became available. Santiago del Estero was retired by September 1981 but ARA Santa Fe (S-21) would take part in the 1982 Falklands War. She landed a team of Buzos Tácticos (tactical divers) on the initial amphibious assault and weeks later, after a successful resupply mission, was spotted on the surface. She was attacked with AS 12 missiles by a British Wasp helicopter and disabled off Grytviken, South Georgia; scuttled at dock by her crew, the submarine was eventually sunk in deep waters by the British some years after the war ended.

- ARA Santa Fe (S-21), ex USS Catfish (SS-339)
- ARA Santiago del Estero (S-22), ex USS Chivo (SS-341)

=== Fourth generation ===
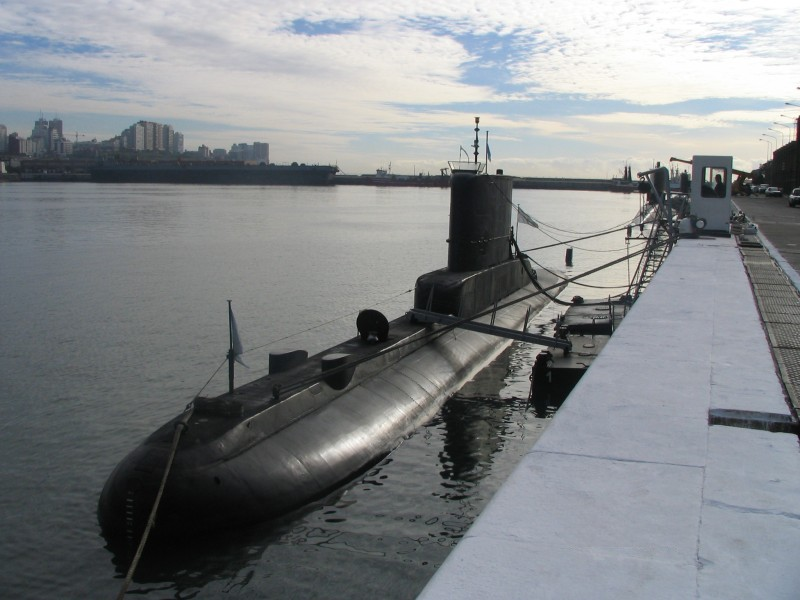
ARA Salta (S-31)

In 1969 a contract was signed in West Germany for two Type 209 submarines, of the 56-metre (184 ft)/1,200-ton sub-type. The vessels were built in parts by Howaldtswerke at Kiel and delivered to Tandanor shipyard in Buenos Aires where final assembly was completed in 1973; they were commissioned in 1974. During the 1982 Falklands War only San Luis (S-32) was in service; she reported two encounters with Royal Navy ships but without scoring hits due to problems with her torpedo's firing system. The threat posed by San Luis, however, forced the Royal Navy to give up recovery efforts of two Sea King helicopters which had ditched at sea on 12 May and 18 May 1982 respectively. Both aircraft were eventually destroyed by naval gunfire. She also tied up a considerable number of British naval assets deployed to counter her presence. There was an attempt to deploy Salta to the Falklands area at the end of May, but excessive noise and problems with the torpedo firing system similar to those found on San Luis prevented her operational use. San Luis was struck from the Navy in 1997 after an incomplete overhaul, whilst Salta (S-31) was still in service as of 2017. As of 2020 Salta was reported to be incapable of navigation.

- ARA Salta (S-31)
- ARA San Luis (S-32)

=== Fifth generation ===
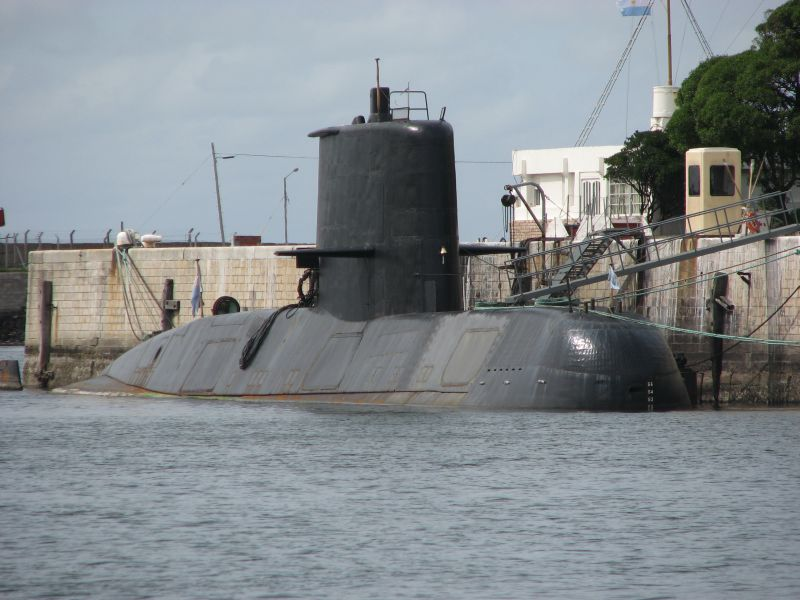
ARA San Juan (S-42)

As part of a major fleet renovation plan which included the MEKO frigates classes, a contract was signed in 1977 with West Germany's Nordseewerke for six TR-1700-class submarines, the last four of them to be built in Argentina. The Argentine Navy sponsored the development of the CAREM nuclear reactor to be installed on these submarines, but for political reasons the whole program was cancelled and only the two German units were delivered. These boats were at the time the largest submarines built in Germany since World War II and were among the fastest diesel-electric submarines in the world.

- ARA Santa Cruz (S-41) as of 2020, the refit of Santa Cruz was reported cancelled leaving the last boat in the fleet inactive.
- ARA San Juan (S-42) Sunk. Presumed lost on 15 November 2017; wreck found on 16 November 2018.
