= Santa Fe-class submarine =

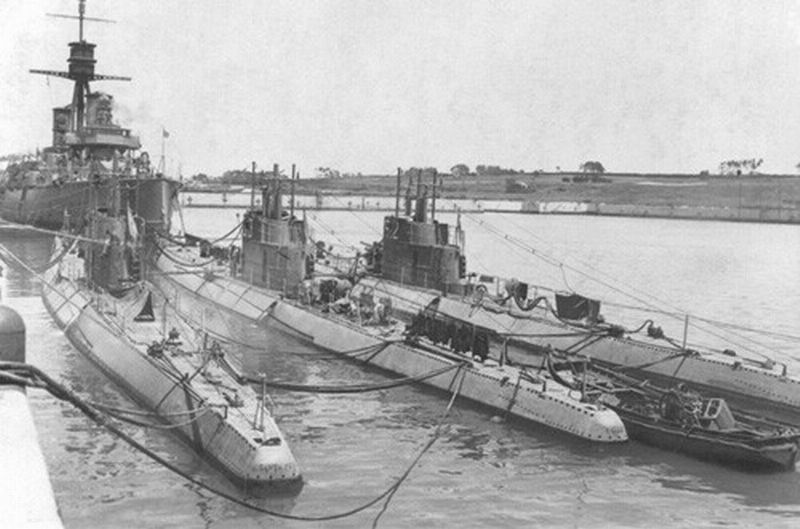
- The three Santa Fe-class submarines in Mar del Plata, in the background mother ship ARA General Belgrano, date unknown

Class overview
- Name: Santa Fe class
- Builders: Cantieri navali Tosi di Taranto, Taranto, Italy
- Operators: Argentine Navy
- Built: 1928–1958
- In commission: 1933–1960
- Planned: 3
- Completed: 3
- Retired: 3

General characteristics
- Type: Submarine
- Displacement: 920 long tons (935 t) surfaced; 1,155 long tons (1,174 t) submerged
- Length: 69.20 m (227 ft 0.4 in)
- Beam: 8.68 m (28 ft 5.7 in)
- Draught: 5.05 m (16 ft 6.8 in)
- Propulsion: 2 shafts; 2 Diesel engines, 3,000 hp (2,200 kW); 1 Electric motor, 1,399 bhp (1,043 kW)
- Speed: 17.5 knots (32.4 km/h; 20.1 mph) surfaced; 9 knots (17 km/h; 10 mph) submerged
- Range: 7,100 nmi (13,100 km; 8,200 mi) at 8 knots (15 km/h; 9.2 mph) surfaced; 80 nmi (150 km) at 4 knots (7.4 km/h; 4.6 mph) submerged
- Test depth: 262.5 ft (80.0 m)
- Complement: 40
- Armament: 1 × Cannon 102/35; 1 × anti-aircraft gun; 6 × 21 in (533 mm) torpedo tubes (4 bow, 2 stern); 12 torpedoes

The Santa Fe-class submarines, also known as "Tarantinos" after the city in which they were built, were a class of three pre-World War II submarines, designed and built in Italy in 1928–1933, as part of an Argentine expansion plan for its navy. They were in service with the Argentine Navy from the early 1930s to the late 1950s. The class was named after Argentine provinces starting with "S", as traditional in the Argentine Navy.

== Service History ==
All three ships in the Santa Fe class were built by the Franco Tosti Shipyard in Taranto, Italy. Santa Fe was launched 29 July 1931 and was affirmed the national flag on 26 October 1932. The submarine, along with its sister boats, Santiago del Estero and Salta, sailed to Buenos Aires where they arrived on 7 April 1933. Santa Fe received its combat flag in its namesake port of Santa Fe on 15 October 1933. It arrived in Mar del Plata on 1 September 1933 where it entered service. In a strong storm in July 1938, Santa Fe rescued a fishing boat in the waters off Cape Corrientes. Asides from this incident all three ships saw peaceful careers with little significance, The exception being Santiago del Estero participating in establishing a blockade on Río de la Plata during the Revolución Libertadora, and during which was attacked by a Gloster Meteor.

== Design and Construction ==
The ships were ordered to fulfil the requirement of Article 2 of Law 11.378, which called for 6 submarines in two batches, However only one batch would be purchased. All 3 ships were ordered in October of 1927, All 3 ships would be built by Italian yards to the Cavallini hull configurations.

== Ships in class ==
Ship name	Pennant number	Builder	Laid down	Launched	Commissioned	Decommissioned
Santa Fe	S-1	Franco Tosi, Taranto	1928	28 July 1931	1932	1956 (Note: Scrapped by Dirección General de Fabricaciones Militares (date not confirmed).)
Santiago del Estero	S-2	Franco Tosi, Taranto	1928	28 March 1932	1933	1959 (Note: Sold to Roberto Aguirre and used as oil hulk at the Buenos Aires port.)
Salta	S-3	Franco Tosi, Taranto	1928	17 January 1932	1933	1960 (Note: Sold to Aaron Gutman in 1961; final fate unconfirmed.)

== See also ==
- List of ships of the Argentine Navy
- Submarine Force Command
