= José Domingo Molina Gómez =

Argentine general (1896–1969)

José Domingo Molina
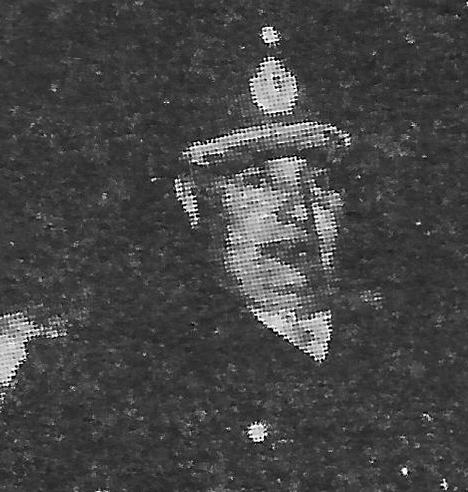
- Picture of Gómez taken in 1955

President of the Junta (Note: Office disputed between Juan Perón and Eduardo Lonardi)
- In office September 20, 1955 – September 23, 1955
- Preceded by: Himself (As leader of the junta)
- Succeeded by: Eduardo Lonardi

Leader of the Junta (Note: Office disputed between Juan Perón and Eduardo Lonardi)
- In office September 19, 1955 – September 20, 1955
- Preceded by: Juan Perón
- Succeeded by: Himself (As official president of the junta)

Commander in Chief of the Argentine Army
- In office 21 September 1947 or 21 September 1953 or 23 September 1953 – 21 September 1955 or 23 September 1955

Director General of the National Gendarmerie Argentina
- In office 1945–1947

Personal details
- Born: 26 September 1896 San Fernando del Valle de Catamarca
- Died: 5 April 1969 (aged 72) Buenos Aires
- Spouse: Delina del Carmen Botana
- Profession: Military

José Domingo Molina Gómez (26 September 1896 – 5 April 1969) was the Commander and Chief of the Argentine Army. Grandson of former president of Argentina Nicolás Avellaneda, he appears to have temporarily taken "the reins of Government" on 19 September 1955. This was following the Revolución Libertadora which had begun on 16 September 1955. Eduardo Lonardi would eventually be recognized as the de facto President of Argentina on 23 September 1955.

== Biography ==
Born in San Fernando del Valle de Catamarca on September 26, 1896, was the son of Daniel Molina Avellaneda and Melitona Gómez. His grandfather was Nicolás Avellaneda, former president of Argentina. In his early career, José Domingo married Delina del Carmen Botana in Choya, Santiago del Estero.

He was appointed as Director General of the National Gendarmerie Argentina from 1945 to 1947. He was then appointed as the Commander and Chief of the Argentine Army.

The Revolución Libertadora began on September 16, 1955. On September 19, 1955, President Juan Perón wrote what appeared to be a resignation letter.

A military junta composed of general José Domingo Molina and other military officers was created with Molina at "the reins of Government". The next morning Perón asked for asylum in Paraguay, leaving the government in the hands of the military junta. Eduardo Lonardi would eventually be recognized as the de facto President of Argentina on September 23, 1955.

On October 3, 1955, Molina was arrested by Eduardo Lonardi and later released.

He died in Buenos Aires on 5 April 1969 at the age of 72.
