= José María Guido =

33rd President of Argentina

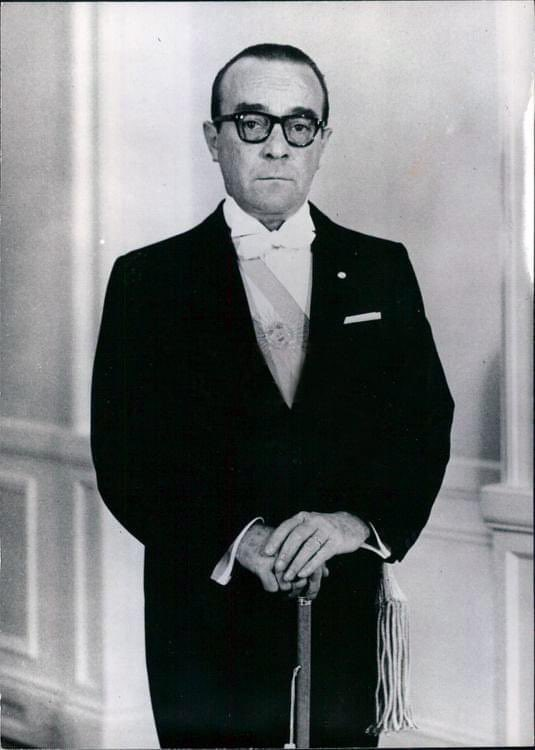
- Guido in 1962

33rd President of Argentina
- In office 29 March 1962 – 12 October 1963
- Vice President: None
- Preceded by: Arturo Frondizi
- Succeeded by: Arturo Umberto Illia

Provisional President of the Senate
- In office 31 March 1958 – 29 March 1962
- Preceded by: Ramón Albariño
- Succeeded by: Eduardo Gamond

National Senator
- In office 1 May 1958 – 29 March 1962
- Constituency: Río Negro

Personal details
- Born: José María Guido Cibeira; 29 August 1910 Buenos Aires, Argentina
- Died: 13 June 1975 (aged 64) Buenos Aires, Argentina
- Resting place: La Recoleta Cemetery, Buenos Aires, Argentina
- Party: Radical Civic Union
- Spouse: Purificación Areal
- Education: National University of La Plata
- Profession: Lawyer

José María Guido Cibeira (29 August 1910 – 13 June 1975) was President of Argentina from 29 March 1962 to 12 October 1963, serving as the head of a provisional civilian government after the Argentine military overthrew President Arturo Frondizi. Guido's nineteen months in office were characterized by a severe economic recession, open conflict between competing factions within the armed forces, and anti-democratic measures including continued proscription of Peronists from Argentine politics. Yet Guido, with critical support from the "legalist" faction of the military, prevailed in his mission to return Argentina to constitutional government with a general election held on 7 July 1963.

== Biography ==
=== Early life ===
José María Guido was born in Buenos Aires on 29 August 1910. His father José María Emilio Guido Repetto was born in La Plata with Italian ancestry, while his mother, Carmen Cibeira Mosquera, was born in Piñor, Galicia in northern Spain.

He grew up in the capital's San Telmo barrio and graduated from the University of La Plata law school in 1940.

=== Early career ===
Prior to his involvement in politics, Guido worked as a lawyer and was a member of the centrist Radical Civic Union (Unión Cívica Radical or UCR), the traditional party of Argentina's middle class. In 1946, he moved to Viedma, the provincial capital of Río Negro in the Patagonia region to join the law firm of Edgardo Costello.

Guido's career in public service started with his involvement in drafting Law 200 in 1951, which created the Instituto de Desarrollo del Valle Inferior del Río Negro (IDEVI), a provincial agency tasked with developing the province's hydroelectric resources. Appointed as an advisor to IDEVI, Guido traveled to the U.S. to meet with officials from the Tennessee Valley Authority, a public utility.

Within a decade, Guido had become a national political figure. When the UCR split in 1956, he joined the dissident branch that became the Intransigent Radical Civic Union party (Unión Cívica Radical Intransigente or UCRI) and was appointed to its Executive Committee secretariat. In 1958, he was elected to the Argentine Senate representing Río Negro; his former employer Costello won the governorship of Río Negro in the same election. During his time in the Senate, Guido was known to be a skilled negotiator and partnered with Rio Negro Senate colleague José Enrico Gadano of the opposition Popular Radical Civic Union (Unión Cívica Radical del Pueblo or UCRP) party to promote hydroelectric development in the region.

Fatefully for Guido, he was also elected by his peers to serve as Senate President, making him next in line for the Presidency upon the resignation of Vice President Alejandro Gómez in November 1958. Guido served as Acting President in January 1959 when then-President Arturo Frondizi made a state visit to the United States. His two weeks in that capacity was notable for his decision to crack down on a general strike protesting Frondizi's privatization program. Foreshadowing his later co-optation by military authorities, Guido responded to the strike with repressive measures that included placing employees of Buenos Aires' public transport system and state oil company YPF under military control, posting military reinforcements throughout the capital, and arresting labor leaders. Public order was restored but Guido’s relationship with the labor movement deteriorated.

== Presidency ==
Guido ascended to the Presidency after the military deposed constitutionally elected Frondizi in the early morning hours of 29 March 1962. For over 12 hours after the coup, the Argentine Presidency remained vacant as civilian leaders and their military allies worked to forestall the installation of a dictatorship under Army Commander-in-Chief Raúl Poggi. Since the Vice Presidency had remained vacant after Gómez's resignation, Guido was next in line under Article 75 of the Argentine Constitution and the 1868 Law of Succession (ley de acefalía or literally "Law of headlessness").

As a Frondizi loyalist, Guido was hesitant to assume the Presidency and agreed to do so primarily at the urging of UCRI party leaders, particularly Frondizi's Defense Minister Rodolfo Martínez, who conveyed the ex-President's desire for Guido to take office. The UCRP also pledged its support. On the evening of 29 March 1962, Guido was sworn in by the Supreme Court of Argentina and reportedly took his oath on a copy of the Constitution to symbolize the preservation of constitutional procedure and asking that he not be considered a "traitor to his party or to the people." The following day, Guido's swearing-in was reaffirmed in a public ceremony attended by Supreme Court justices and Congressional and military leaders.

Although nominally President, Guido was a "virtual captive" required to "co-govern" with the armed forces, which exercised the "negative power of veto" over civilian authorities. A further complication was the split within the military between the Azules ("Blues"), also known as legalistas due to their support for a "legalist" transfer of power in accordance with the Constitution, and the Colorados ("Reds") who were eager to install a military dictator. The intense rivalry between the two factions culminated in violent confrontations in late 1962 and early 1963 that brought Argentina to the brink of civil war. The Azules emerged victorious in the ensuing battles, enabling Guido to remain in office and paving the way for the return to constitutional government through the July 1963 election that brought Arturo Umberto Illía of the UCRP to power.

=== Economic record and policy ===
In the final years of the Frondizi administration, the Argentine economy had recovered from the economic crisis of 1959 but continued to face high inflation (by historical standards) due to an excessive rate of credit expansion and balance of payments deficits as a severe drought sharply reduced agricultural exports. By March 1962, foreign exchange reserves had fallen to US$125 million, a 70% decrease from twelve months earlier.

Pressured by military and agrarian interests, Guido appointed Álvaro Alsogaray as Minister of the Economy. Alsogaray was the architect of orthodox stabilization program under Frondizi and enacted similarly restrictive policies. Foreign exchange controls were liberalized and the peso was devalued by 59%. Monetary and credit conditions were tightened and M2 money supply growth was reduced from an average of 35% per year in 1960–1961 to 23% in 1962 and only 10% in 1963. Fiscal austerity was implemented and Central Bank financing of the budget deficit was virtually eliminated.

The result was a severe two-year recession. Real GDP decreased by -1.6% in 1962 and -2.4% in 1963. Despite tight fiscal and monetary policy, inflation accelerated from 13% in 1961 to 28% in 1962 and 26% in 1963, driven by the peso devaluation and reduced subsidies for public services. Urban unemployment reached 9% in July 1963, a level that would not be exceeded for thirty years, and bankruptcies hit new records. However, the stabilization program succeeded in its primary goal of averting a balance of payments crisis with foreign exchange reserves increased to US$320 million by the end of 1963.

Growth and a modest diversification of exports were one of the few bright spots in the economy during Guido's term. Exports reached US$1,385 million in 1963, an increase of over 40% from 1961 and the highest level since 1948, as agricultural production recovered from drought. Beef exports benefitted from penetrating new markets in Italy and Spain and intensive efforts to control an outbreak of foot-and-mouth disease that locked Argentina out of the U.S. market. Argentina also experienced an encouraging expansion of non-traditional exports, including sugar, fruit juices, and even manufactured goods such as motor vehicle parts, agricultural machinery, tools, and textiles.

During Guido's term, Argentina remained open to foreign direct investment which had been a cornerstone of Frondizi's economic policy. In mid-1963, the U.S. Chamber of Commerce estimated that American companies had invested over US$1 billion in Argentina and employed over 135,000 local workers in the motor vehicle, petroleum, electric appliances, pharmaceuticals, food and beverage, and consumer products industries. U.S. and European companies contributed to Argentina's development by operating training programs, although many of the newly-trained employees subsequently sought to emigrate since their skills were in demand abroad.

=== Foreign trade and balance of payments ===
Alsogaray's stabilization program drove a remarkable turnaround in Argentina's current account balance from a US$572 million deficit in 1961 to a US$385 million surplus in 1963. In addition to higher exports, Argentina saw a sharp 33% reduction in imports from 1961 to 1963 due to depressed consumer demand and the end of the Frondizi-era capital investment boom. The country also continued to benefit from Frondizi's controversial petroleum contracts, which had enabled a reduction in oil imports from US$250 million in 1958 to only US$90 million in 1962.

However, Argentina continued to face significant balance of payments pressures. Political instability and the "serious economic disequilibrium" resulted in an outflow of capital that offset the gains from a narrower merchandise trade deficit.

Dollar shortages and import restrictions also impacted efforts to revive the economy. Petroleum production declined in 1963 because state oil company Yacimientos Petroliferos Fiscales lacked dollars to import equipment and pay foreign oil companies for service contracts signed by Frondizi.

Argentina received US$56 million from the International Bank for Reconstruction and Development in 1963, and was one of the bank's largest recipients that year. On 29 March 1963, Guido secured a US$322 million credit package that included new loans, foreign exchange agreements, and refinancing existing debts.

One month before the 1963 general election, the U.S. government agreed to lend US$35.5 million to Argentina at less than 1 percent interest for a housing program and to address balance of payments issues. Unfortunately much of the foreign debt, even official assistance, was short-term in maturity. By mid-1963, it was estimated that half of Argentina's US$2.8 billion of external debt was payable by the end of 1966. Private Argentine companies held US$532 million in foreign debt, nearly half of which was payable by the end of 1963, setting up continued pressure on the balance of payments.

=== Fiscal policy ===
Determined to avoid deficit monetization at all costs, Alsogaray implemented strict measures to balance the budget, including new taxes such as a 20% income tax surcharge and a 5% levy on imports. Yet in spite of his emphasis on orthodoxy, Alsogaray was responsible for a policy where government employees and contractors were paid partly in bonds rather than cash; recipients who sold their bonds were typically forced to take a discount of up to 40%.

Despite austerity measures, depressed tax revenues meant that the budget deficit actually increased from 5.6% of GDP in 1961 to 7.9% in 1962, before falling to 5.8% of GDP in 1963.

The Guido administration borrowed heavily from multilateral institutions, including a US$25 million 15 year loan from the Inter-American Development Bank for farm mechanization.

=== Social policy ===
Argentina received aid for low-income housing. However, by mid-1963, U.S. officials decided to wind down its aid program due to Argentina's high living standards at the time.

=== Relationship with the military ===
The Argentine armed forces saw themselves as guarantors of democracy and the Constitution. General Benjamin Rattenbach defended intervention "when the opinion of the military prevails in the orientation of the Government over the opinion of the civilian political forces."

Guido's Presidency was defined by the power struggle between the Azules and Colorados factions in the military, which resulted in violent outbreaks and ultimately a victory for the Azul forces and their leader, future military dictator Juan Carlos Onganía. The Azules moved first on 20–21 April 1962 with non-violent troop movements led by General Enrique Rauch in the streets of Buenos Aires that successfully forced the resignation of Poggi and Army Secretary Marino Carreras, who were linked to the Colorados.

Colorado influence remained strong. By August 1962, rumors were circulating that hard-line factions were planning to replace Guido with a military junta. Open skirmishes took place on 20 September 1962 with the Colorados this time reportedly firing first; however, within 72 hours the Colorados were defeated. Guido openly allied himself with the Azules and appointed Onganía as Army Commander-in-Chief on 22 September.

Tensions peaked with an attempted coup by the Colorados on 2–5 April 1963. Although the revolt was led by retired officers from all three branches of the military, support among active duty troops was highest in the Navy and insurgents seized control of the Navy headquarters. For a moment, it appeared that Argentina would be consumed by a civil war. Yet the revolt was doomed when the Air Force and key units of the Army remained loyal to the Guido government and rebel forces surrendered on 5 April.

Over 200 members of the armed forces were detained for participating in the April 1963 uprising. Fifteen high ranking officers reportedly escaped from prison barracks on 16 June 1963. Hoping to promote reconciliation, Guido issued a general amnesty for the Colorado insurgents on 12 September 1963.

=== Foreign policy ===
Under Guido, Argentina pursued closer ties with the U.S. and "proved to be an important Cold Warrior in Latin America" through its hardline stance against Cuba. In August 1962, Argentina blocked Cuba's application to join the Latin American Free Trade Association, a clear reversal from Frondizi's decision in January 1962 to oppose Cuba's expulsion from the Organization of American States (OAS). When the Cuban Missile Crisis broke out in October 1962, Guido was the first Latin American leader to pledge military support to the U.S. and sent two naval destroyers, Espora and Rosales, to help the Americans enforce a blockade of Cuba. Military officials made their own independent overtures to U.S. contacts, with Brigadier General Cayo Alsina offering Air Force support to his U.S. counterpart and Onganía offering Army support in case of a land deployment. Domestic opposition to Argentina's involvement was suppressed; on 27 October 1962, police in Buenos Aires fired tear gas into a "rock-throwing mob of about 400 people."

Argentina supported an American proposal allowing the OAS to investigate Cuban sponsored subversive activity in any member state even without the member government's permission.

U.S. authorities reciprocated. Ambassador Robert McClintock wrote to Assistant Secretary of State for Inter-American Affairs Edwin Martin: "The Argentine military, in my judgment, should be regarded as an asset by the United States (if rightly used) and not as a liability as some people in Washington seem to believe." President Kennedy "expressed warm appreciation for Argentina’s Cuban quarantine cooperation as the first nation to offer material assistance".

In its 1962 Plan of Action for Argentina, the U.S. State Department established as a key objective to "[c]ooperate with and support the Guido Government in all feasible ways in order to strengthen it vis-à-vis the military."

Cuba in turn threatened to sponsor uprisings and Castro identified Argentina as among the countries in Latin America that were ready for Cuban-style revolutions.

Argentina played a key role in President John F. Kennedy's Alliance for Progress aid program for Latin America.

Argentina was cited by the American Jewish Committee for anti-Semitism in the wake of Eichmann's arrest and alleged that Fascist and anti-Semitic groups "had the secret backing of certain military leaders."

Tensions existed with Spain in spite of ideological affinity between the two right-wing "sister republics" due to Perón continued interference in Argentine politics while living in exile in Madrid. Spanish authorities responded that they could restrain Perón's public activities but were not able to restrict private contacts, which reportedly included visits from Argentine union and political leaders.

=== Political rights and freedoms under Guido ===
Under pressure from the Colorados, Guido enacted a series of anti-democratic measures in the spring of 1962. On 13 April 1962, Guido convened a special session of Congress to amend the Law of Succession to give him 180 days to call for a new election rather than 30 days as the law required. Although the Senate approved the change, Guido was unable to secure approval from the Chamber of Deputies and dissolved the special session on 23 April. On 24 April, Guido annulled the results of the prior month's provincial elections and the following day annulled the Congressional election, stating that he would "not consent to a single Peronist occupying a public or elective post at whatever level, municipal, provincial or national."

On 20 May, after the UCRP withdrew support for his administration, Guido suspended Congress altogether.

Guido followed up on 24 July 1962 with decrees establishing the Statute of Political Parties and Law of Elections, both of which were designed to improve the electoral standing of conservative parties. The Statute of Political Parties created minimum thresholds that effectively proscribed the Peronist Unión Popular along with dozens of smaller parties, while the Law of Elections enacted proportional representation to break the UCRP and UCRI stronghold on Congressional seats.

However, the media remained relatively free under Guido. For example, La Nación, a prominent Buenos Aires newspaper, felt free to publish an editorial commenting that the Law of Succession had been applied "with appreciable elasticity".

In June 1963, Guido proscribed Unión Popular candidates from the newly formed multi-party coalition Frente Nacional y Popular (National and Popular Front). On 5 July 1963, Perón added to the confusion by ordering his supporters to cast blank ballots. However, the election was carried out peacefully and in a generally "honest" manner on 7 July 1963 with an 85% participation rate, demonstrating Argentines' commitment to democracy in spite of the electoral restrictions, social and political unrest, and economic stagnation at the time.

== 1963 general election ==
Tensions were high as the election approached with rumors that either active duty or retired military officials would stage a coup to prevent the elections. Army leaders confined troops to their barracks forestall any coup attempts while Onganía traveled to garrisons to encourage officers to support the election. The electoral tensions occurred against a backdrop of continued social and political turbulence. Two weeks prior to the election, 270,000 teachers nationwide went on strike for higher wages while movie houses shut down to protest restrictions on screening foreign films. A judge ordered the release of Celia de la Serna de Guevara, Che Guevara's mother, who was detained for allegedly smuggling in pro-Cuban propaganda from Uruguay.

At first the Azules agreed to permit limited participation by Peronists. However, Minister of the Interior General Osiris Villegas issued last-minute decrees that eliminated the seven-party Front and threatened its Presidential candidate Vicente Solano Lima with judicial disqualification. Lima in turn accused Guido of lending "his symbolic figure to this act of tyranny" and warned that the "military are obligated to respect the will of the people." However, Argentina's electoral courts declined to block Lima's candidacy, ruling that he had not been accused of an actual offense.

Villegas also disqualified Christian Democratic candidate Raul Matera for his past ties to Perón in a decree issued on 3 July 1963. Rumors circulated that Villegas would participate in a coup to prevent the elections from taking place.

The Argentine Communist party was banned and liquidated on 25 May 1963.

Guido made public appeals for his countrymen to respect the elections and allow a return to constitutional government. However, Guido rejected a demand by the Confederación General del Trabajo trade union federation to postpone the election by a week and on 19 April 1963 reluctantly authorized the arrest of 50 UCRI colleagues as ordered by Minister of the Interior General Enrique Rauch.

The general election was held as planned on 7 July 1963 with 70,000 troops deployed to maintain order. As a precautionary measure, police detained almost 400 civilian and labor union leaders across the country prior to the election. Approximately 150 of the prisoners were released by the end of July 1963 and the remainder prior to Illia's inauguration in October.

Senators were selected by provincial legislatures and the federal capital's electoral college on 29 July 1963.

The UCRI split again when Frondizi, still in detention, formed a new party. UCRI leader Oscar Alende campaigned on continuing Guido's economic policies and encouraging foreign investment, although with better opportunities for the working class. Alende ruled out a coalition with the UCRP but agreed to support Illia in the electoral college vote that occurred on 31 July 1963. Argentina's Christian Democratic party also agreed to support Illia to prevent the nomination of a compromise candidate from the military.

The setbacks to both Perón and Frondizi were viewed favorably by Azul military leaders and considered a "special triumph" for Onganía.

Instability did not end with the election. Several weeks after the election, Delia Parodi, a Peronist secretary general, warned that Perón's followers would turn to subversion due to continued proscription on participating in Argentine political life. On 11 July 1963, Guido issued a decree that banned 29 groups considered fronts from Communist activity ranging from the Federation of Labor Unions to cultural organizations such as the Institute of Argentine-Russian Cultural Relations and the Federation of Jewish Cultural Organizations.

== Post-Presidency ==
After completing his term, Guido returned to Viedma to resume his legal career. He returned to public service by accepting a position at Hidronor S.A., a state-owned hydroelectric utility established by then-dictator Onganía in 1967. He was appointed as President of Hidronor in 1973 but resigned the following year.

Guido also played an active role in the formation of the center-right Partido Provincial Rionegrino (PRP) party in 1972 under then-governor Roberto Vicente Requeijo. The PRP would remain a significant force in provincial politics until the early 1990s.

Guido died on 13 June 1975 in Buenos Aires and is buried in the city's Recoleta Cemetery.

== See also ==
- Civic-military dictatorship of Uruguay - Military dictatorship in Uruguay that appointed a number of civilian presidents between 1973 and 1985
- Juan María Bordaberry - Uruguayan president kept in power as a figurehead by the Uruguayan dictatorship

Political offices
Preceded by Arturo Frondizi	President of Argentina; 1962–1963	Succeeded by Arturo Umberto Illia
