= Lanchas Amarillas =

Type of wooden fishing boat

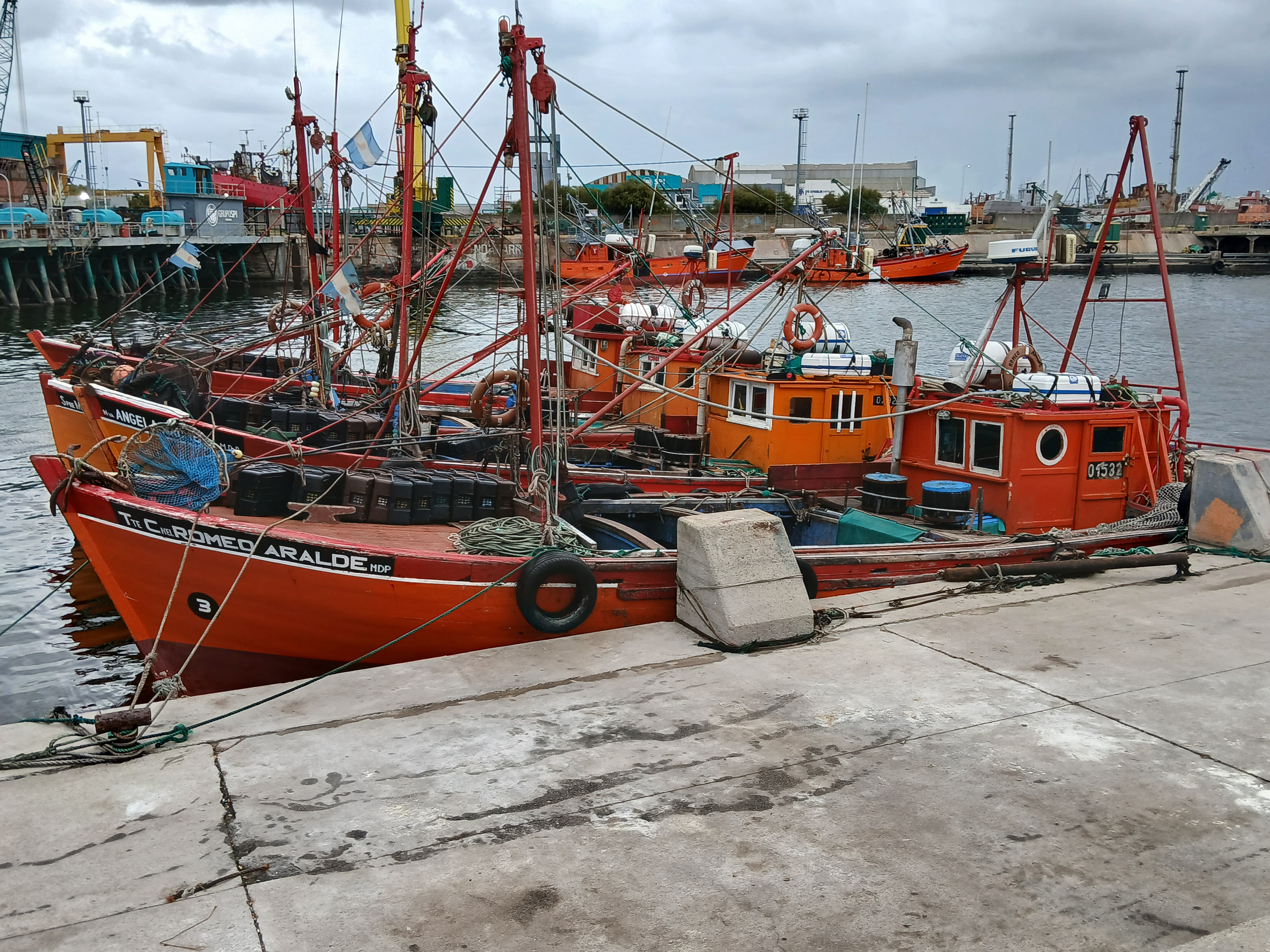
Lanchas Amarillas moored at Mar del Plata's port

Lanchas Amarillas (en: "yellow launches") are wooden fishing boats typical of the port city of Mar del Plata, in Argentina. There are several distinct classes based on length, which usually ranges from 9–16 metres (30–52 ft). They were built in small local shipyards mostly during the period from 1930 to 1950, particularly when school shark fishing was at its peak during World War II. Their name derives from the yellow-orange or saffron colour that they are painted with. This became a mandatory requirement in 1946 when several such boats and 31 lives were lost in a major storm. Now largely outdated for commercial purposes, the fishing boats became a cultural icon of Mar del Plata.

== Features ==
The general characteristics in the structure of these vessels are determined by the nature of sea in which they operate. A medium-sized launch, built in or around 1948, would be made of noble woods (cedar, lapacho, viraró, etc.). It would be approximately 13 meters long; the length in meters of the vessel is directly proportional to its weight in tons (gross tonnage). Its hold capacity would be between 70 and 100 crates (2800 to 4000 Kg), and it would be crewed by 5 men. According to the Prefectura Naval, the coastal fishing vessels around 1960 were classified in the following way:

- Type I: Up to 9 meters in length, with a range of up to 8 nautical miles and an authorized navigation time of up to 12 hours.
- Type II: Up to 12 meters in length, with a range of up to 30 nautical miles and an authorized navigation time of up to 24 hours. These vessels have a deck and a sealed opening. There was an 8-hour tolerance that the skipper had to justify upon arrival at port.
- Type III: Up to 16 meters in length, with a range of up to 100 nautical miles and an authorized navigation time of up to 36 hours. These vessels also have a deck and a sealed opening.
- Type IV: More than 16 meters in length, with a range of up to 100 nautical miles and an authorized navigation time of 36 to 72 hours. These vessels have a deck, a sealed opening, and a collision bulkhead. If they have habitability (a living area, dormitory, kitchen, toilet, etc.), they can navigate for up to 72 hours.
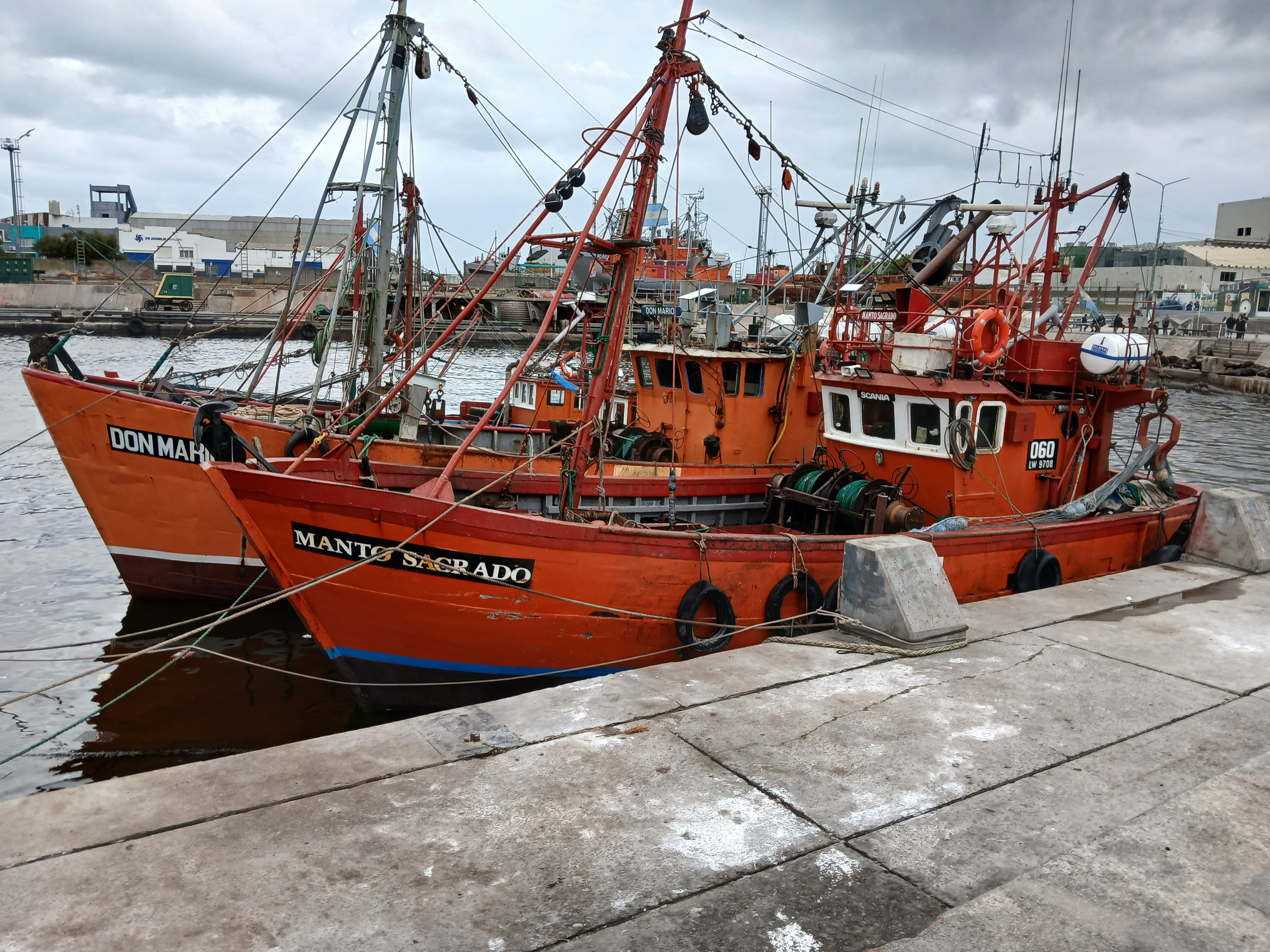
  Type III boats moored alongside the wharf, Mar del Plata's port, March 2026

The length is particularly important because its measurements are related to the operating range and navigation time. The Maritime and Fluvial Digest established these four categories for the period. Types II, III, and IV could undertake individual or group voyages with no limitation on hours of absence or operating range, as long as they stayed within 30 nautical miles of the coast, stopped at intermediate ports in the fishing zones they crossed, and their captains or skippers had the proper qualifications.

Fishermen in Mar del Plata traditionally use the length (eslora) as a measure that summarizes a series of a boat's qualities. The effectiveness of this intuitive approach was confirmed in 1968 by a simple statistical study that established the correlation coefficient between the length of a group of vessels and their gross registered tonnage (GRT), net registered tonnage (NRT), and horsepower (HP). The results were as follows: Length – GRT r = 0.98; Length – NRT r = 0.96; Length – HP r = 0.92. The empirical perception of the fishermen was thus "scientifically" verified.

== History ==
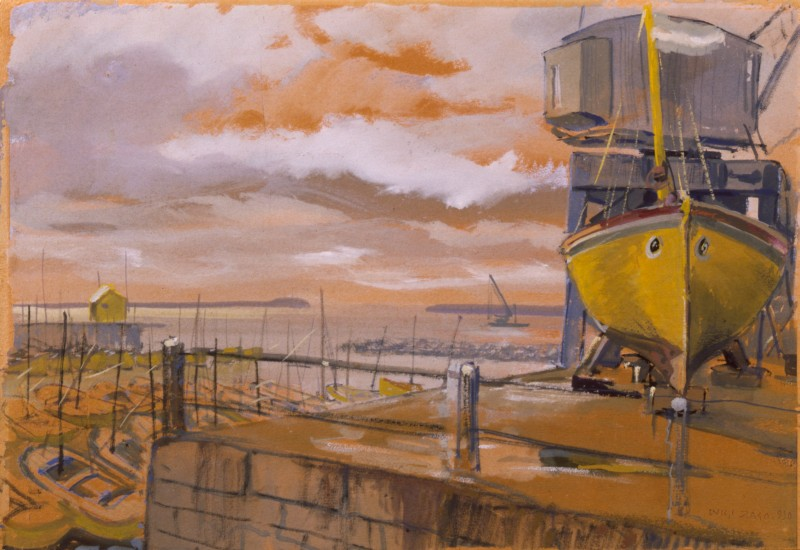
Zago, Luigi: Porto a Mar del Plata (1950). The bulk of fishing boats were still built without cabins at the time.

Mar del Plata is the main industrial fishing port of Argentina and the cradle of Argentina’s commercial fishing. Since the industry's founding, it had been predominantly managed by Italian immigrants and their descendants. Oral tradition has it that in 1890, the first lateen-rigged sailboats arrived in Mar del Plata from the port of La Boca in Buenos Aires. They were two sailing vessels without a compass or stopovers, and they navigated for three days by hugging the coast during the day and mooring at night.

At that time, there were already four or five boats in Mar del Plata, with lengths ranging from 6 to 8 meters. These sailboats worked in pairs and used a type of trawl net called a ragno (spider in Italian). Until the inauguration of the port in 1917, the fishermen of Mar del Plata operated from the open beach, using horses to push their boats through the soft sand and the later pull them through the shallow.

The first motor boat, the La Nélida, appeared by 1912; local historian Roberto Barili sailed on another, the La Elisa, in 1914. The first diesel engine was acquired in 1936 to equip the launch Plus Ultra.

The development of the canning industry in Mar del Plata in the 1930s and the need of vitamin D by the Allied countries during World War II, obtained from the shark liver oil of school sharks, boosted the fishing industry in Argentina in the 1940s. Other species commonly caught were the Atlantic chub mackerel and the Argentine anchovy.

The prevalent paint of the launches was, until the decade of 1940, the white, but to improve visibility it was changed to yellow, and became mandatory after the 29 August 1946, when five vessels sank and the lives of 31 fishermen were lost at sea.

Three lanchas amarillas were requisitioned by the Argentine Navy to evacuate naval personnel and later to land the marines that took over the local naval base when it was assaulted by forces loyal to Juan Perón's government on 19 September 1955, during the bombardment of Mar del Plata, in the course of the self-proclaimed Revolucion Libertadora. One of the launches, the Type III Corsario, became stranded under fire and ran aground, but was refloated one week later.

There were 272 lanchas amarillas registered in Mar del Plata in 1959, and other 66 in other ports across Argentina's Atlantic coast. The boats were built, modified, or repaired in local workshops or small shipyards in Mar del Plata. By 1950, there were 15 of these. In the 1940s, the National Mortgage Bank granted a line of credit to fishermen to alleviate the transfer of fishing funds and for the construction of homes. With these loans, they were able to free up some income to acquire and modify the fleet.

== Decline ==
Although the launches had been economically superseded by 1975, they evolved over the years into a cultural icon of Mar del Plata. From the 272 vessels at the peak of their activity in the 1960s, the fleet had been constantly shrinking since then to the point that by 2022 only 14 remained operative. There are still sporadic campaigns focused on specific species, such as the corvina in Samborombon Bay or the fishing of bonito in 2025.

== Sources ==
- Mateo, José (2015). Gringos que montaban olas: Historia de la Pesca Costera en Argentina (PDF) (in Spanish). Mar del Plata: Gesmar - UNMDP. ISBN 978-987-33-6689-5.
