= Eduardo Lonardi =

25th President of Argentina

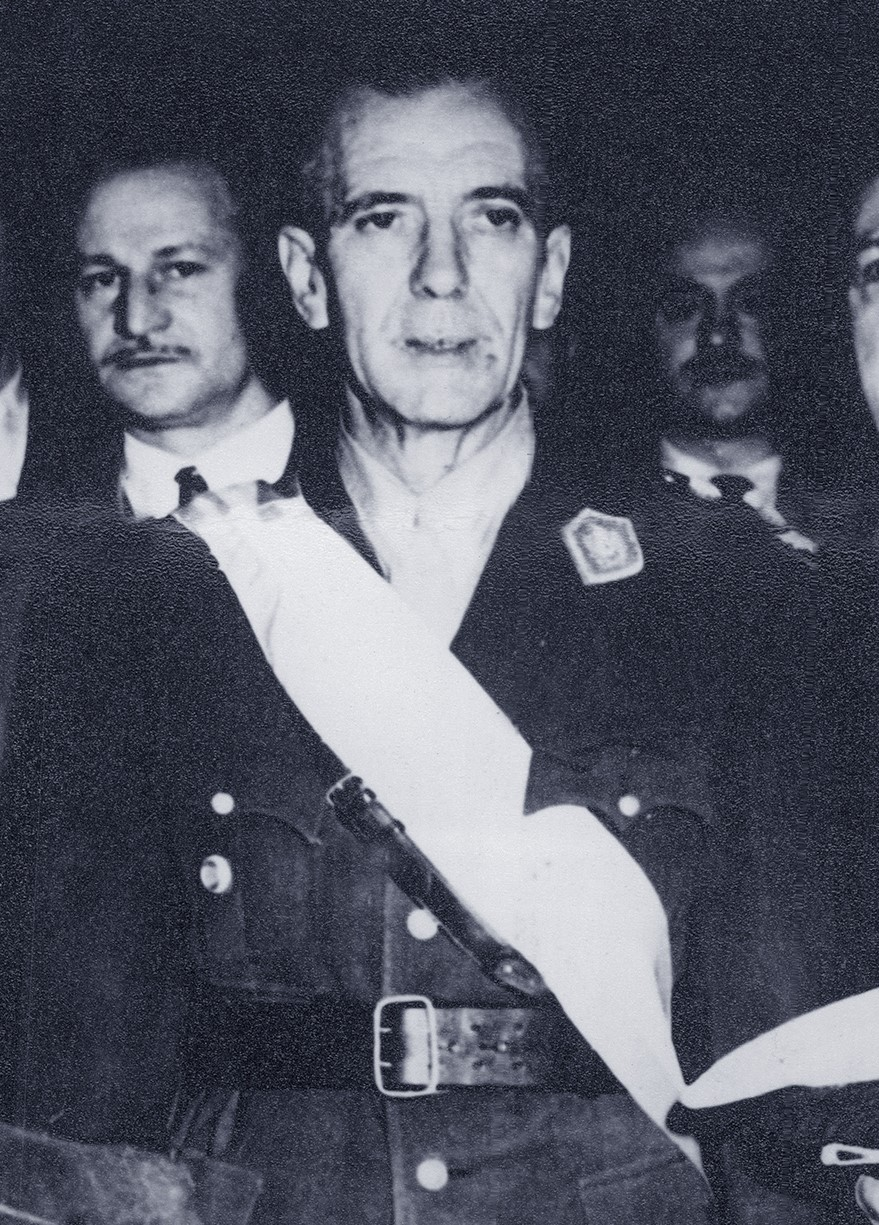
- Lonardi in September 1955

30th President of Argentina
- De facto
- In office September 23, 1955 – November 13, 1955
- Appointed by: Military junta
- Vice President: Isaac Rojas (de facto)
- Preceded by: José Domingo Molina Gómez (As president of the junta); Himself (As provisional president of the nation)
- Succeeded by: Pedro Eugenio Aramburu (de facto)

Provisional President of the Nation (Note: Disputed between Juan Perón and José Domingo Molina Gómez)
- In office 16 September 1955 – 23 September 1955
- Preceded by: Juan Perón (As president)
- Succeeded by: Himself (As president)

Personal details
- Born: September 15, 1896 Buenos Aires, Argentina
- Died: March 22, 1956 (aged 59) Buenos Aires, Argentina
- Party: Liberty Party
- Spouse: Mercedes Villada Achával (1924–1956)
- Profession: Military
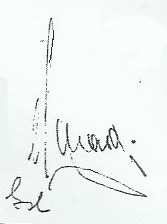
- Signature

Eduardo Ernesto Lonardi Doucet (Spanish pronunciation: [eðuˈaɾðo loˈnaɾði]; September 15, 1896 – March 22, 1956) was an Argentine Lieutenant General and served as de facto president from September 23 to November 13, 1955.

== Biography ==
Lonardi was born on September 15, 1896. His father, Eduardo Policarpo Lonardi Monti was born in Ospitaletto (Brescia), while his mother, Blanca Delia Doucet Santa Ana, was from Rosario.

Lonardi was appointed military attaché to Chile during the presidency of Ramón Castillo in 1942, shortly afterward he was declared persona non grata by the Chilean government on accusations of espionage. Returning to Argentina, he participated in the coup that overthrew Castillo. He then was appointed military attaché to Washington, D.C. around 1946 where he stayed for a few years. He then permanently returned to Argentina.

== President of Argentina ==
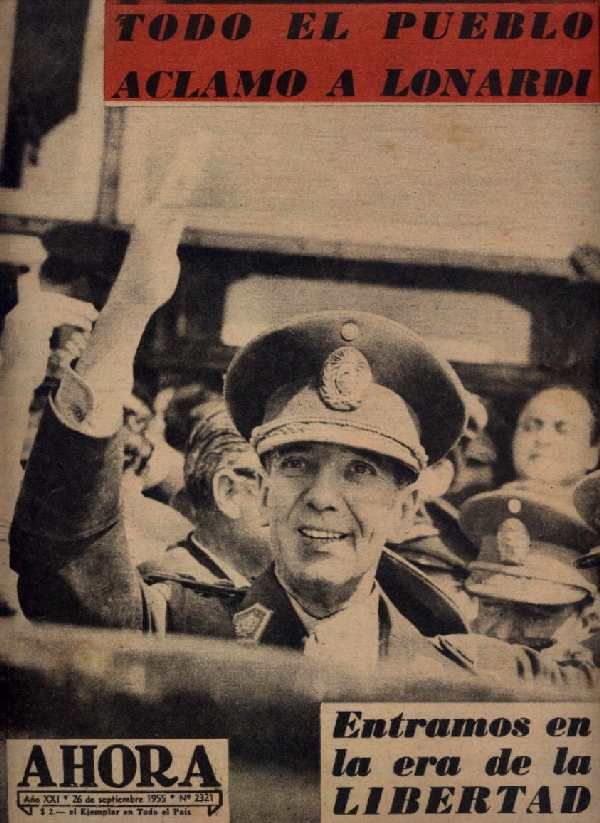
Cover of a magazine after Lonardi came to power.

Eduardo Lonardi, a Catholic nationalist, assumed leadership of the Revolución Libertadora junta that overthrew Juan Perón on September 16, 1955. He was greeted by chants of Cristo Vence ("Christ is Victorious") when arriving in Buenos Aires. Favoring a transition with "neither victors nor vanquished", his conciliatory approach was deemed too soft by the liberal faction of the armed forces, who deposed him less than two months into his de facto presidency and replaced him with hard-liner Pedro Aramburu.

== Later years and death ==
He went to the United States to receive cancer treatment. He returned to Argentina and died on 22 March 1956 from cancer.

== Political views ==
Eduardo Lonardi was a Catholic nationalist, besides this he also embraced conservative liberalism.

In terms of economics he supported economic liberalization however in practice the economist Raul Prebisch influenced him.

== Notes ==
Political offices
Preceded by José Gómez	President of Argentina; 1955	Succeeded by Pedro Eugenio Aramburu
