= Bombing of Plaza de Mayo =

1955 failed military coup and attack of a pro-Perón rally in Buenos Aires, Argentina

Coordinates: 34°36′30″S 58°22′19″W

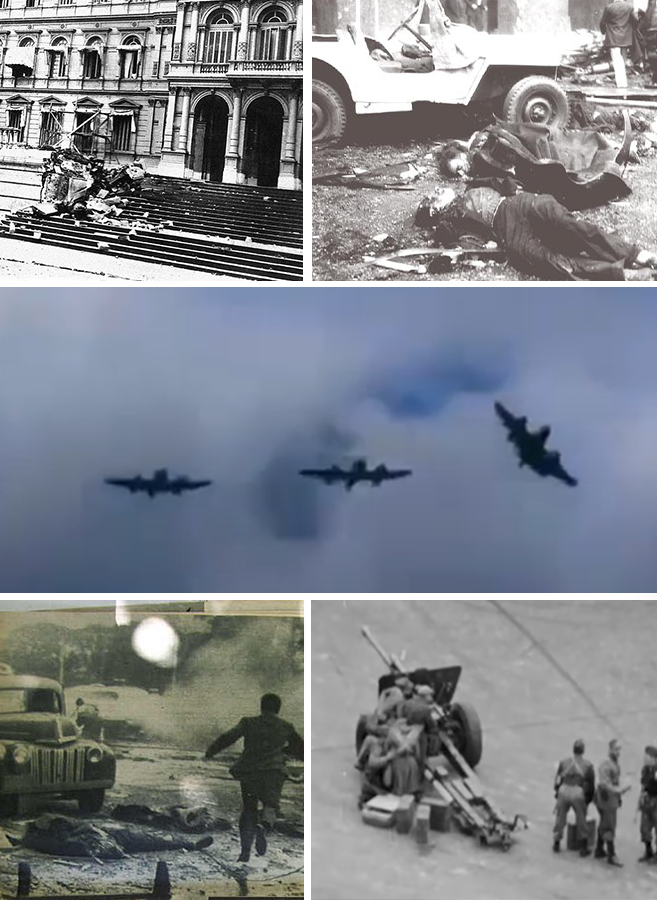
| Date | 16 June 1955 (12:40–17:20 UTC-3) |
| Location | Plaza de Mayo, Buenos Aires, Argentina. |
| Action | Failed decapitation strike and coup d'état attempt |
| Result | Government victory |

Belligerents
| Argentine government: Loyal Argentine Armed Forces; Peronist militants | Anti-Peronist faction: Rebels elements of the Armed Forces |

Commanders and leaders
| Juan Perón; Franklin Lucero | Samuel Toranzo Calderón; Benjamín Gargiulo †; Aníbal Olivieri |

Units involved
| Regiment of Mounted Grenadiers; Motorized Garrison Buenos Aires; 1st Regiment; 3rd Regiment; Argentine Air Force | Argentine Naval Aviation; 7th Air Brigade; 4th Naval Infantry Battalion elements of the Argentine Air Force |

Strength
| 330 Mounted Grenadiers; 4 aircraft 4 Sherman tanks Armed Peronist civilians | 700 marines 30–34 aircraft At least 875 civilian commandos |

Casualties and losses
| 17 killed (Note: 9 grenadiers, 5 policemen, 2 soldiers and an armed Peronist civilian.); 55 wounded | 44 killed and wounded 3 aircraft shot down |
- 156-308 civilians killed or more including 40 children that could not be verified

On 16 June 1955, 30 aircraft from the Argentine Navy and Air Force bombed and strafed Plaza de Mayo, the main square of the Argentine capital Buenos Aires. The attack targeted the adjacent Casa Rosada, the seat of government, while a large crowd demonstrated in support of the president, Juan Perón. The strike took place during a day of official public demonstrations to condemn the burning of a national flag allegedly carried out by detractors of Perón during the recent Corpus Christi procession. The military reacted as a result of growing tension between Perón and his actions against the Roman Catholic Church. The action was to be the first step in an eventually aborted coup d'état. The number of identified bodies was put at 308, including six children, making it according to some sources the deadliest terrorist attack in Argentine history. Some victims could not be identified.

The heavy loss of civilian lives and the violence with which the act was carried out has prompted comparisons with the wave of state terrorism during the dictatorship of 1976–1983.

== Background ==
After his victory in the 1946 Argentine general election, President Perón had enacted many reformative policies that considerably changed Argentina, including embracing industrialization, nationalizing railroads, financing public works, and instituting material benefits for labor, such as higher wages. By 1955, he had spent nine years in power. His first term was marked by isolationism, with an emphasis on Argentine self-sufficiency. Increased fiscal spending caused a drop in cash holdings and foreign earnings. Problems during his second tenure included rising inflation, a stagnant economy, and labor strikes, mostly in support of higher wages. His leadership style also drew heavy criticism from academics, clerics, and other elements of the international community for embracing censorship and cracking down on freedom of expression. The death of his second wife, first lady Eva Perón, in July 1952 had diminished his popular appeal and party support.

== The attack ==
=== Bombing, strafing, and ground fighting ===
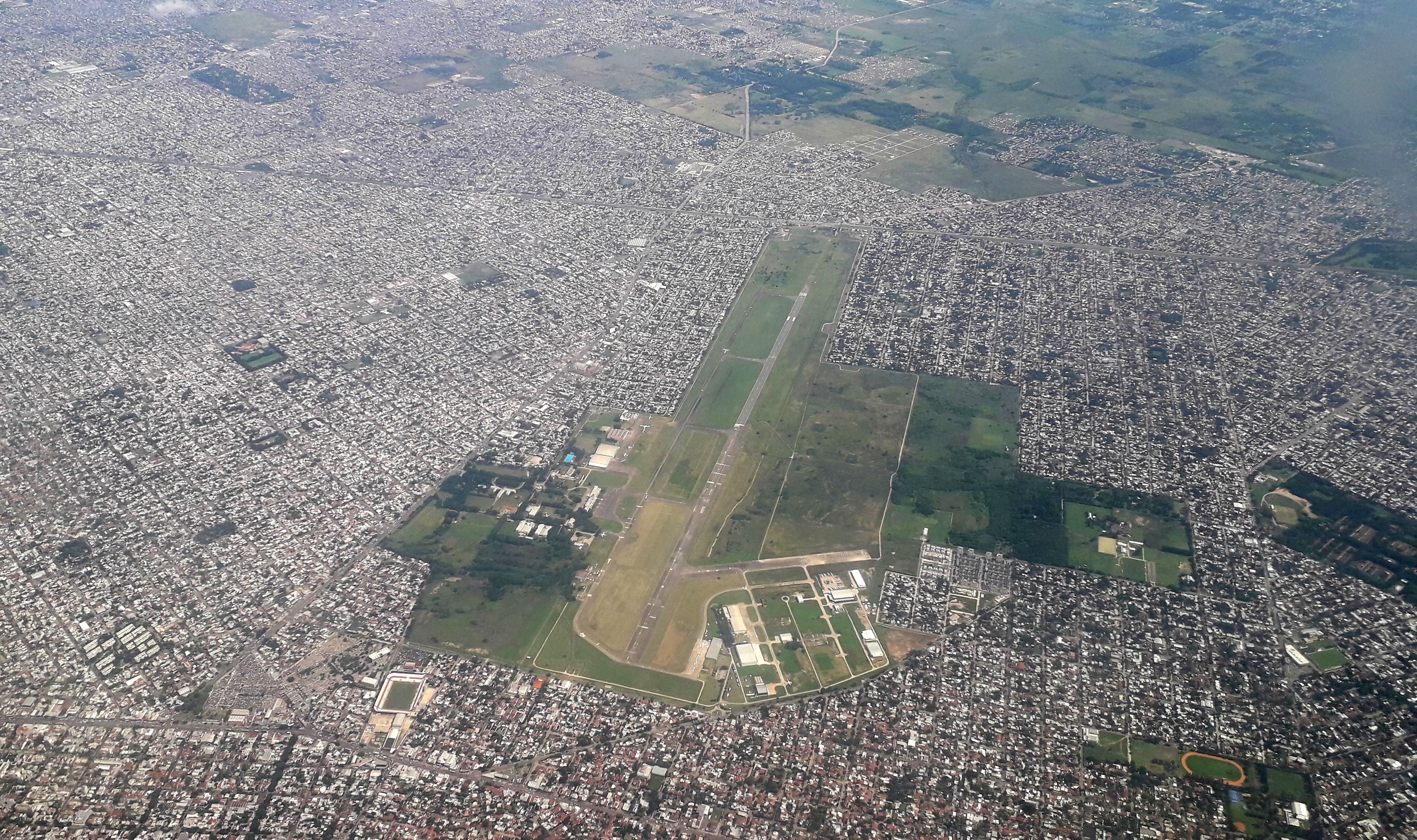
Morón Air Base in 2019

On 16 June 1955, at 12:40 pm, a force of thirty Argentine Naval Aviation airplanes, consisting of 22 North American AT-6, five Beechcraft AT-11, and three Consolidated PBY Catalina flying boats took off from Morón Air Base. Perón had been warned of the movements beforehand by General Franklin Lucero, Minister of War. Lucero had advised Perón to retreat into a bunker under the Libertador Building.

The attack was carried out in the crowded city center on Thursday, during working hours. Without warning, the attack led to many civilian casualties. Those commuting on public transport were among the first recorded victims. As the first bomb fell on a trolleybus packed with children, it killed everyone on board.

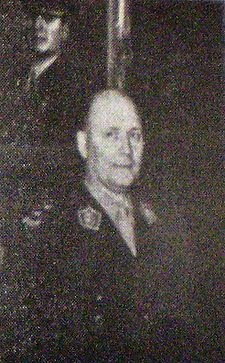
General Franklin Lucero

Meanwhile, two companies of the rebel 4th Marine Infantry Battalion marched on the Casa Rosada, intending to capture it. One was deployed 40 meters from the northern façade while the other took position in the Automóvil Club Argentino parking lot, between Colón Park and the Central Post Office, 100m from the rear. However, they were pushed back by members of the Regiment of Mounted Grenadiers from within the Casa Rosada and by Army troops marching from the sector of the Ministry of Finance, under the command of General Lucero. The defense of the Casa Rosada consisted of a mere two 12.7mm Browning M2 machine guns placed on the roof, while defenders on the lower floors only had access to small arms, including bolt-action Mauser 1909 rifles. Loyal troops were accompanied by Peronist civilians who took up arms.

At 13:12, union leader Héctor Hugo Di Pietro, acting head of the CGT due to the absence of its Secretary-General, spoke on national broadcasting, calling all workers in the Federal District and Greater Buenos Aires to concentrate immediately around the CGT building, in order to defend the constitutional government. Moreover, union officials were already mobilizing workers from factories around Buenos Aires towards the city center. Perón ordered his adjutant, Major Jose Ignacio Cialceta, to inform Di Pietro that a clash strictly between soldiers was taking place and therefore civilians were not to gather in Plaza de Mayo. Historian Joseph Page claimed, citing a US Embassy report, that this order was not given until 16:00.

Consequently, the bulk of the civilian casualties occurred when large numbers of mobilized workers arrived in Plaza de Mayo to defend the presidency of Juan Perón. Gloster Meteor fighters suddenly arrived to bomb and strafe the large crowds of Peronist supporters exiting the central subway and gathering in the nearby streets and the immediate vicinity of the Presidential Palace, killing and wounding hundreds in the process.

According to police commissioner Rafael C. Pugliese, a police observation reported at 14:00, large numbers of civilians arrived in trucks to defend the Presidential Palace and gathered in the Paseo Colón and Belgrano pedestrian walkways around it, before being caught out in the open when the main air attacks took place at 15:00. The Gloster Meteors then bombed the survivors as they pulled up from their final dive bombing attacks and headed back to base.

The rebel ground offensive began to wane around 15:00, as the marines surrounding the Casa Rosada's northern façade came under fire from army artillery units positioned in a building located at the intersection of Leandro N. Alem and Viamonte streets. Olivieri contacted the Higher School of Mechanics of the Navy to request reinforcements, however, it was already surrounded by elements of the 1st Infantry Regiment.

The marines retreated in disarray towards the Ministry of the Navy, where they would remain under siege from loyal Army units until the end of hostilities that evening. Lucero ordered the use of heavy machine guns against the rebels, and 81mm mortars were brought in to reinforce the assault. At 15:17, after two telephone conversations between Olivieri and Lucero, the rebels waved a white flag from the Ministry of the Navy. However, when generals Carlos Wirth and Juan José Valle arrived in a jeep to discuss the terms of surrender, the second wave of air attacks began. The explosions destroyed two floors of the south wing of the Ministry of War, killing a soldier and a general. At the same time, an M4 Sherman fired on the second floor, causing a fire in the admirals' room.

Simultaneously, civilian commandos under Zavala Ortiz's orders began clashing with the police and sniping from the roofs of various buildings. Throughout the afternoon, rebel reinforcements coming from the Central Post building unsuccessfully tried to break the siege on the Ministry of the Navy building.

=== Air-to-air combat ===
As ground combat raged in the center of Buenos Aires, loyal forces were dispatched from Morón Air Base to intercept rebel fighters. Heated discussions took place among the pilots over the possibility of whether to join the coup or not. A squad of loyal Gloster Meteors took off and one of them shot down a rebel Navy AT-6 Texan over the Río de la Plata, scoring the first air-to-air kill of the Argentine Air Force. Another rebel warplane was downed by ground fire from hastily mounted anti-aircraft batteries.

In the meantime, Morón Air Base along with the loyal pilots were captured by anti-Peronist forces. Their Meteors were seized and pressed into service by the rebels, participating in strafing sorties until the final surrender. With the coup on the verge of failure, naval warplanes launched a second attack on the seat of government. Having run out of ordnance, one pilot dropped his auxiliary fuel tank as an ersatz incendiary bomb, which fell on the cars in a parking lot near the Casa Rosada.

=== Retreat and surrender ===
After heavy urban fighting, which included a false surrender incident, the besieged rebels finally opted for handing over the Ministry of the Navy to the Army units posted outside. Fire ceased at 17:20 local time. Between 9.5 and 13.8 tonnes of ordnance were dropped, killing between 150 and 364 people, mostly civilians, and injuring over 800. Nine members of the Mounted Grenadiers Presidential Guard and five police officers were killed in action.

Faced with the failure of the intended coup, the rebel pilots received orders to head toward Uruguay to seek asylum. At least 32 civilian and military aircraft headed towards Carrasco Airport, continuing along the way to drop their bombs until they ran out of ammunition. Most of them landed in Carrasco, and four others in Colonia. One Gloster Meteor crash-landed in the Río de la Plata off Carmelo, having exhausted all its fuel during the attacks. The pilot was rescued by a local resident. The pilots were interned by the Uruguayan government until the fall of Perón in September.

At 03:00 on 17 June, Olivieri, Toranzo Calderón, and Gargiulo, the three top leaders of the failed coup, were informed they were to be tried under martial law and were each offered a pistol to end their lives, which Olivieri and Toranzo Calderón declined. Gargiulo, however, accepted the offer and committed suicide in his office at 05:45.

== Aftermath ==
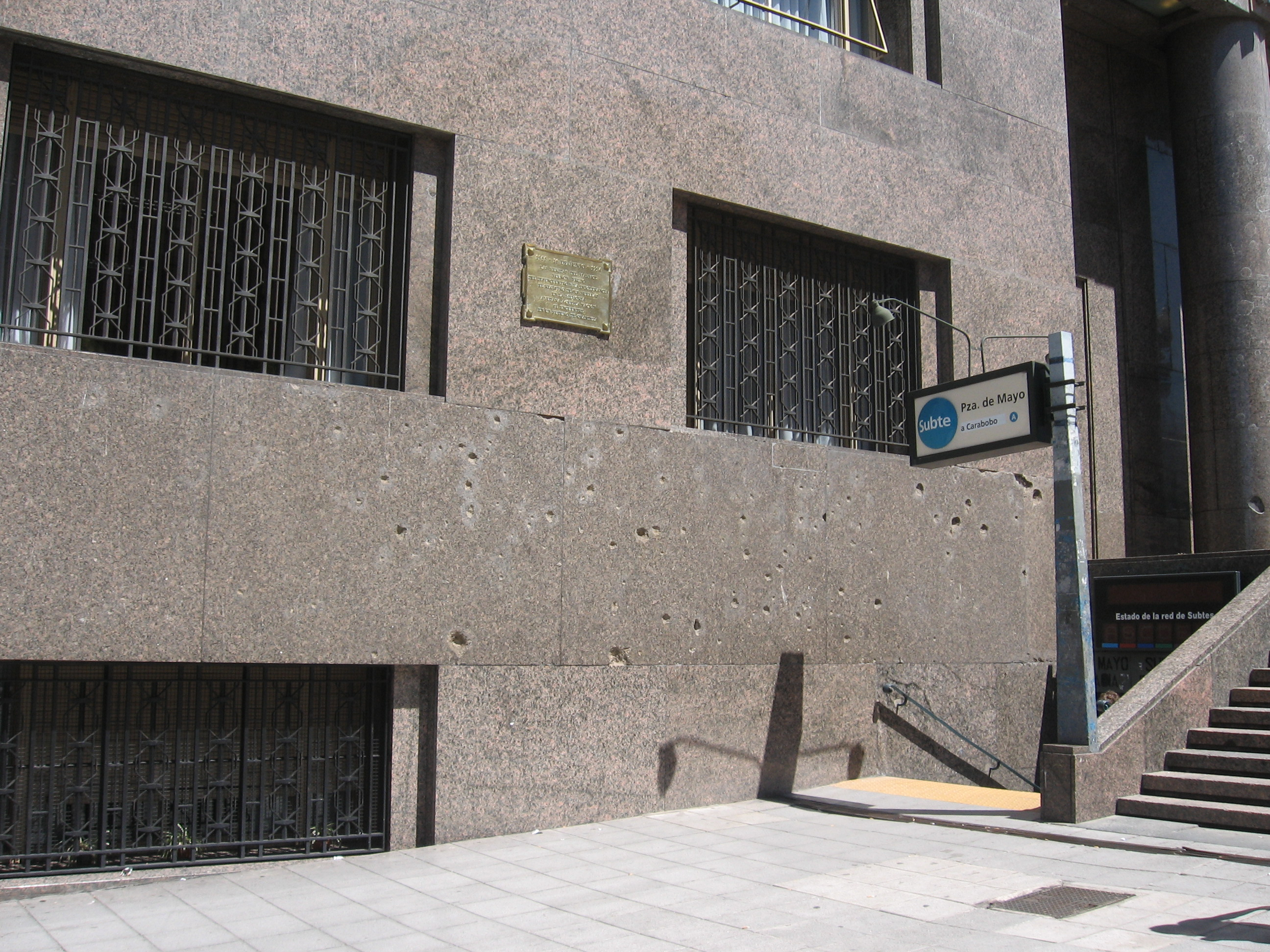
Shrapnel-ridden outer wall of the Ministry of Economy, pictured in 2009

That same night, Peronist crowds burnt eight churches, two basilicas, and the Curia office in revenge for the Catholic Church's support to the coup.

In September of that year, the bulk of the armed forces joined in a coup d'état known as the Revolución Libertadora, which overthrew President Perón and started a military dictatorship that lasted until the 1958 presidential elections, won by Arturo Frondizi of the UCRI. The Peronist party was not allowed to stand for election, but Frondizi's victory was aided by a pact between himself and Perón.

One of the rebel leaders, radical Miguel Ángel Zavala Ortiz, went on to serve as an official during the Revolución Libertadora dictatorship and was later appointed Minister of Foreign Affairs and Worship by President Arturo Illia in 1963.

One of the naval pilots who took part in the bombings, Máximo Rivero Kelly, was promoted and was second-in-command of the Argentine Navy during the presidency of Raúl Alfonsín. He would later claim that the naval aviation's target was the Presidential Palace but that an aircraft missed, causing about 20 civilian deaths.

Bullet and shrapnel marks remained visible on some buildings on the south side of the square as of 2023.

== Casualties ==
Peronist sources claim around 400 were killed. In 1965, a journalist from Extra magazine claimed that once the fighting had ended near Plaza de Mayo, there were around five hundred people either dead or heavily injured. On 22 June 1955, commissioner Rafael C. Pugliese in the Official Police Report put the official death toll at 136 after collating the number of identified as well as unidentified bodies in the morgues of various hospitals in Buenos Aires. The various medical centres that received victims and helped in identification and counting the deaths were: Public Assistance (62 dead), Argerich (45 dead), Rawson (3 dead), Clínicas (7 dead), Ramos Mejía (7 dead), Alemán (2 dead), Fernandez (3 dead), Policlínico del Ministerio de Hacienda (3 dead), Policlínico Militar (2 dead), Policlínico Rivadavia (1 dead) and Morgue Judicial (1 dead).

Of the 136 killed according to Pugliese's report, five were police officers: Senior Officer Alfredo Aulicino (head of the Personnel Section of the Communications Directorate), Sub-Inspector Rodolfo Nieto (1st Political Order Section), Agent José María Bacalja (1st Mechanical Workshop and Garage Section), Agent Ramón Alderete (Traffic Police Corps) and retired agent César Augusto Puchulu. The rebel and loyal military suffered a combined 44 casualties.

In 2023, the Argentine Chamber of Deputies released an updated report claiming that among the killed were 111 trade unionists of the General Confederation of Labour (CGT) and that 6 minors, one of which was a 3-year-old had perished alongside them.

The claim that 40 school children died when a bus was struck by a bomb during the 1955 Plaza de Mayo bombing is historically inaccurate, and historians consider it an urban legend or a politically motivated myth. A definitive investigation published by the National Archives of Memory (Archivo Nacional de la Memoria) meticulously cross-referenced hospital records, death certificates, and autopsy reports from the massacre.

== See also ==
- List of massacres in Argentina
- Revolución Libertadora
- Bombardment of Mar del Plata
- Tanquetazo, a similar failed coup attempt that preceded the 1973 Chilean coup d'etat

== Bibliography ==
- Cichero, Daniel (2005). Bombas sobre Buenos Aires. Gestación y desarrollo del bombardeo aéreo sobre Plaza de Mayo (in Spanish). Buenos Aires: Vergara. ISBN 950-15-2347-0.
- Moreno, Isidoro Ruiz (2013). La Revolución del 55 (in Spanish). Claridad. ISBN 978-950-620-336-8.
- Portugheis, Elsa (2010). Bombardeo del 16 de junio de 1955 (PDF) (in Spanish). Buenos Aires: Secretaría de Derechos Humanos de la Nación Argentina.
