= Benjamín Menéndez =

Argentine general

General Benjamín Menéndez
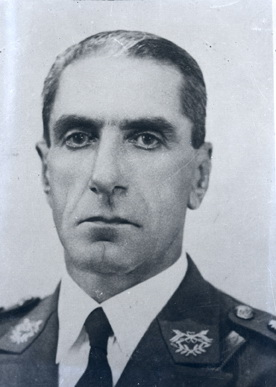
- Brigadier General Benjamín Menéndez
- Born: Benjamín Menéndez; 1885; Córdoba, Argentina
- Died: 2 September 1975 (aged 89–90)
- Military career
- Allegiance: Argentina
- Branch: Army
- Rank: Brigadier General
- Unit: Cavalry
- Commands: Division Commander

Benjamín Andrés Menéndez (1885 – 2 September 1975) was an Argentine brigadier general who attempted on 28 September 1951 to overthrow the government of Juan Domingo Perón. The coup was defeated within a few hours.

== Attempted coup ==
President Perón instituted a number of policy reforms after he took office in 1946. He supported a "third-way" that neither subscribed to the views of the West nor that of the Soviets. At first his plan was to attain economic independence for Argentina and decrease the influence of imperialist powers. However his wife, Eva Perón, who supported much more radical reforms for the country, influenced him to support much more socialist stances. The five-year plan that Perón initiated found disfavour among much of the military.

Eva held ambitions to replace Hortensio Quijano for the 1951 election, although her poor health kept her from this. Nonetheless, many were concerned that her agenda would be pushed through. In March 1951 the government arrested several retired army officers due to their dissent and disapproval of Perón's administration. This raised tensions among the rest of the army, although action did not occur.

By September tensions had risen among the military due to the unrivalled power of the Peronist regime. On 28 September 1951, during the election, Menéndez led the military uprising in an attempt to overthrow the government. He led a core of officers, commanding a division, and left Campo de Mayo bound for the Casa Rosada.

Resolve for the uprising, especially among the non-commissioned officers and enlisted men, was not strong enough. They were not prepared to fight their own countrymen. The uprising was over as soon as opposition was encountered, almost completely bloodless. Perón admired the loyalty of the troops and pardoned all those involved.

Although the revolt was crushed, it did succeed in that Eva never again considered running for office and both Peróns were forced to curtail their reform aspirations.

== Family ==
Menéndez had two sons, Romulus and Felix Menéndez, who both had military careers and eventually reached the rank of colonel. Romulus is also a renowned historian who has published several works on military history, including Las conquistas territoriales argentinas (Argentine Territorial Conquests) published by the Military Circle and Un Soldado (A Soldier), a biography of his father. His nephew, former major general Luciano Menéndez, was sentenced to life imprisonment in December 2009 for crimes against humanity. He was also the uncle of Brigadier general Mario Benjamín Menéndez, who was the military governor of the Falkland Islands during the Falklands War.
