= Revolución Libertadora =

1955 coup d'état in Argentina

1955 Argentine coup d'état
- Part of the Cold War
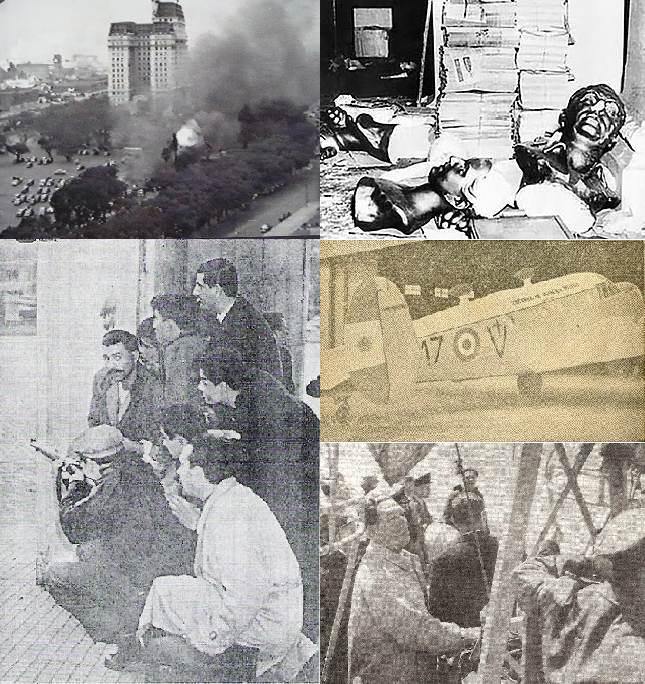
- Top left: Bombing and machine-gunning near the Libertador Building. Top right: Mannequins of Perón and Eva Perón destroyed. Bottom left: Peronist militiamen and workers fire at the Ministry of the Navy. Center right: Plane with the inscription Cristo Vence used by rebel forces. Bottom right: Juan Perón leaves for exile on a Paraguayan Navy ship.
Date	16–23 September 1955
Location	Plaza de Mayo, Buenos Aires, Argentina
Action	Military uprising against Peron's Government. For several days, there was some fighting in provinces such as Córdoba and Corrientes.
Result	Peronist government overthrown; Military dictatorship seizes power; José Domingo Molina Gómez becomes acting head of state.

Belligerents
(Argentina) Second Perónist Government (16 September 1955–19 September 1955) (Argentina) Military Junta Provisional Government (19 September 1955–23 September 1955): (Argentina) Armed Forces loyalists * Army loyalists * Air Force loyalists; Peronist Party; General Confederation of Labour; Nationalist Liberation Alliance	(Argentina) Revolutionary Provisional Government (16 September 1955–23 September 1955): (Argentina) Argentine Armed Forces * Argentine Army * Argentine Navy * Argentine Air Force; Argentine Federal Police; Argentine opposition: Radical Civic Union; Socialist Party; National Democratic Party; Communist Party; Democrat Progressive Party; Christian Democrat Party

Commanders and leaders
Juan Perón (Argentina) José Domingo Molina Gómez (Argentina) Alberto Teisaire (Argentina) Franklin Lucero; Guillermo Patricio Kelly	(Argentina) Eduardo Lonardi (Argentina) Pedro Aramburu (Argentina) Isaac Rojas (Argentina) Julio César Krause (Argentina) Juan José Uranga (Argentina) Justo León Bengoa (Argentina) Benjamín Menéndez (Argentina) Federico Toranzo Montero (Argentina) Francisco José Zerda

Political support
Peronists; Aliancistas	Uruguay; Radicals; Socialists; Conservatives; Communists; Christian democrats

Military support
Loyalists of the Argentine Armed Forces	Dissidents of the Argentine Armed Forces

The Revolución Libertadora (Spanish pronunciation: [reβoluˈsjon liβeɾtaˈðoɾa]; Liberating Revolution) as it named itself, was the civic-military dictatorship that ruled the Argentine Republic after overthrowing President Juan Domingo Perón, shutting down the National Congress, removing members of the Supreme Court, as well as provincial, municipal, and university authorities, and placing the entire Judiciary under commission. This occurred through a coup d'état on 16 September 1955.

Uruguay, led by Luis Batlle Berres, received 90 aviators involved in the May Square Bombings, and provided the anti-peronist military with logistical supply, radio broadcast relays and port access for warships. Western powers were not involved in the coup, but they saw its outcome as a major Cold War victory against Latin American non-alignment and helped stabilize the new regime. The Eisenhower administration provided financial loans and intelligence coordination to combat instability. British diplomats welcomed the new government as an ideal opportunity to reopen Argentine markets, tie Argentina with Western security and dismantle Perón’s pragmatic trade agreements with the Communist bloc. West Germany's intelligence agencies such as the Bundesnachrichtendienst collaborated with the post-coup Argentine apparatus and financed anti-communist propaganda.

After two years the dictatorship organized conditional elections, which transferred power on 1 May 1958 to a constitutional government led by the Radical Arturo Frondizi, who in turn would also be overthrown by another military-led coup d'état in 1962.

== Background ==
After the end of World War II, the Military Junta that had ruled Argentina since the coup d'état of 1943 ended when Juan Domingo Perón was first elected in 1946. In 1949, a constitutional amendment sponsored by Peronism introduced a number of labour reforms along with unrestricted presidential reelections. The legitimacy of the new constitution is still controversial. Perón was reelected in 1951. At the time, his administration was widely supported by some labor unions, the military and the Catholic Church.

On September 28, 1951, a rebellion led by Benjamín Menéndez, with members of the Army, Navy, and Air Force, attempted to overthrow Perón. The rebels argued that the Peronist government had led to the nation's "total bankruptcy of its internal and external credit, both morally, spiritually, and materially." The restrictions on civil liberties and opposition actions, the constitutional reform that allowed for the president's reelection, and the measures politicizing the armed forces appear to have influenced the military supporters of the movement. The rebel forces encountered resistance—both active and covert—from the non-commissioned officers in charge of the initial force's tanks and lacked the support of units they had expected to count on, so after half a day they surrendered to the loyalist forces.

Economic downturns, some of them product of government's foreign trade policies, Perón's own personality cult, the regime's increasing authoritarian tendencies, including suppression of freedom of press and repression of perceived political rivals, persecution and exile of dissidents and the dismantling of several labour unions, along with clashes with the church and the leadership of the armed forces led to weakening of his base at the same time popular discontent grew. Writers, artists, politicians or anyone perceived as dissident were harassed, blacklisted and even jailed with some forced into exile. As the Church increasingly distanced itself from Perón, the government, which had first respected the Church's privileges, now took them away in a distinctly confrontational fashion. By 1954, the Catholic clergy was openly anti-Peronist, which also influenced some factions of the military. Meanwhile, a Christian Democratic Party was founded in 1954 after several other organisations had been active promoting Christian democracy in Argentina.

By 1955, Perón had lost most of his support. A large contingent of the military, who conspired with other political actors (members of the Radical Civic Union and the Socialist Party, as well as conservative groups). There was turmoil in different parts of the country. On 14 June, Catholic bishops spoke against Perón during a Corpus Christi procession which turned into an anti-government demonstration.

== Military uprising ==
=== First coup attempt ===
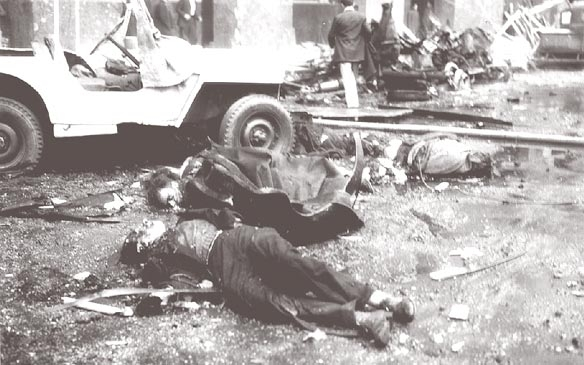
Civilian casualties after the air attack and massacre on Plaza de Mayo, June 1955

On 16 June 1955, 30 Argentine Navy and Air Force aircraft bombed Plaza de Mayo, Buenos Aires' main square, killing over 300 civilians and wounding hundreds more. The attack remains to this day the largest aerial bombing ever executed on the Argentine mainland. The bombing targeted the adjacent Casa Rosada, the official seat of government, as a large crowd was gathered there expressing support for president Juan Perón. The strike took place during a day of official public demonstrations to condemn the burning of a national flag allegedly carried out by detractors of Perón during the recent procession of Corpus Christi.

In retaliation, extremist Peronist groups attacked and burned several churches that night, allegedly instigated by Vice-President Alberto Teisaire.

The only important political support for Perón came from the General Confederation of Labour (the main confederation of labor unions), which called the workers to defend the president. Perón addressed a workers' demonstration on 31 August.

=== September uprising ===
On 16 September, a new uprising, led by General Eduardo Lonardi, General Pedro E. Aramburu and Admiral Isaac Rojas, deposed Perón and established a provisional government. For several days, there was some fighting in places like the city of Córdoba (Lonardi's central command), the Puerto Belgrano Naval Base near Bahía Blanca, another naval base at Río Santiago, near La Plata, and a mechanized infantry regiment at Curuzú Cuatiá, Corrientes Province. The rebellion in Corrientes, which was initially defeated, was led by Pedro Eugenio Aramburu, who later became one of the main players of the future government. Two rebel destroyers, which were enforcing the blockade of the Río de la Plata, were strafed by loyalist aircraft and suffered some casualties. The port and the army garrison at Mar del Plata was subjected to naval bombardment on 19 September by the light cruiser ARA 9 de Julio and several destroyers, while scattered skirmishes and airstrikes took place elsewhere, including Buenos Aires itself, where the headquarters of the Nationalist Liberation Alliance, loyal to Perón, were assaulted and destroyed by Sherman tanks on 21 September.

After realizing that the country was on the brink of a civil war, Perón decided to avoid massive bloodshed and resigned as President, subsequently seeking asylum in Paraguay after taking shelter aboard the ARP Paraguay.

On 23 September, Lonardi assumed the presidency and gave a conciliatory speech from the balcony of the Casa Rosada, saying that there would be "neither victors nor vanquished" (ni vencedores ni vencidos, replaying a phrase uttered by Urquiza when he was victorious over Rosas at the Battle of Caseros). General Lonardi promised that the interim administration would end as soon as the country was "reorganized". His conciliatory tone earned him the opposition of hard-liners, and in November an internal coup deposed Lonardi and placed General Aramburu in the presidency, giving rise to a wild "anti-Peronism".

== Aftermath ==
The "Revolución Libertadora" dictatorship soon accused Perón and his followers of treason, and Eva Perón's remains were kidnapped by members of the dictatorship and moved secretly to Italy, where they were buried in a graveyard at Milan under a fake identity. Public references to Perón or his late wife, including songs, writings and pictures, were forbidden by the dictatorship, even including the mention of the name "Perón" out loud. Sportsmen like Delfo Cabrera, Mary Terán de Weiss, many of the major basketball players, as well as Olympic-level athlete, Osvaldo Suárez, were unfairly punished by the dictatorship and its associated press, by being accused of having gotten their sports success only because they were Perón followers.

The Peronist Party suffered a proscription that was to last until Perón's return in 1973, even though Perón heavily influenced the results of the 1958 and 1963 elections from his exile in Madrid.

== Disputed leadership in the time of the coup d'état ==
Lonardi led the coup focus in Córdoba on September 16, 1955, calling himself the "Liberating Revolution." Lonardi issued a decree called "Decree No. 1" in which he called himself "provisional president of the Nation," requested recognition from other countries, and established the provisional seat of government in the city of Córdoba.

On September 19, 1955, at noon, Perón wrote a confusing letter addressed to General Franklin Lucero, Minister of the Army and loyal to the constitutional government. In the letter, Perón hinted at his resignation:

"A few days ago... I decided to hand over power... Now my decision is irrevocable... Analogous decisions by the vice president and the deputies... Government power therefore automatically passes into the hands of the Army." Juan D. Perón. Letter to General Franklin Lucero.

Lucero sent a communication to all revolutionary commands calling for a cessation of hostilities and the start of negotiations, which was responded to from Córdoba with a brief text by Lonardi demanding Perón's resignation before accepting the truce.

Because the letter was assumed by Lucero as a resignation and Lucero did not want to make the decision and called a meeting of generals, which was attended by more than thirty of them with it he proceeded to form a Military Junta composed of, among others, Generals José Domingo Molina, Raúl Tanco, Juan José Valle, Ángel Juan Manni, Emilio Forcher, José C. Sampayo, Carlos Wirth, Oscar R. Sacheri and Oscar A. Uriondo, who declared that he had assumed Executive Power. Due to the number of generals present, Molina presided over the meeting, as he was the highest-ranking. Also present were the commander-in-chief of the navy, Admiral Carlos Rivero de Olazábal, and the commander-in-chief of the air force, Brigadier General Juan Fabri. José Domingo Molina became the leader of the junta on the same day.

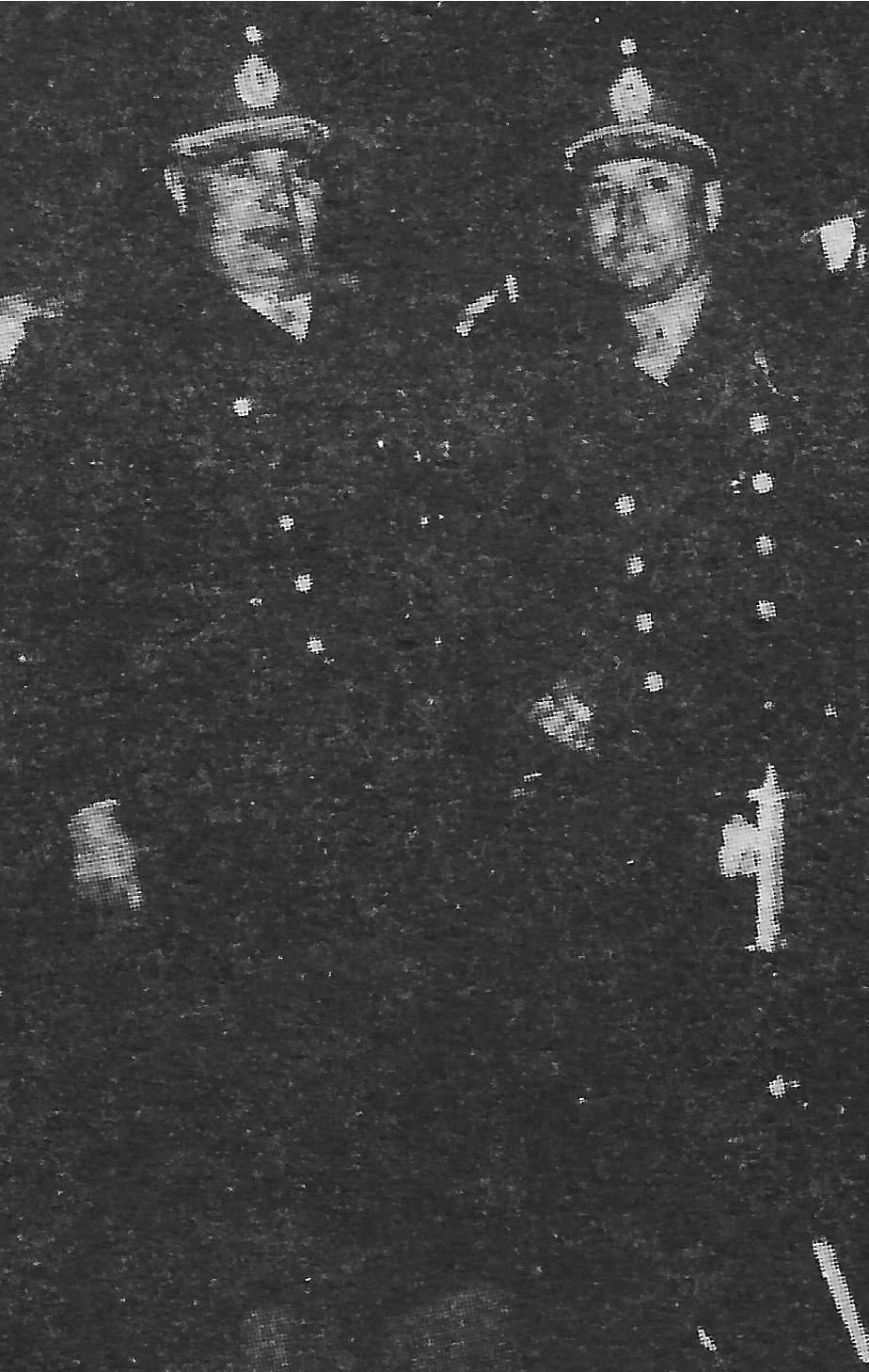
Gómez (left) and Lucero (right) on September 17, 1955. Two days before the establishment of the military junta.

The junta first resolved - not without doubts and discussions - that the letter constituted a resignation and replied to Lonardi with a communiqué that was also read by the radio stations under their control, in which they reported the resignation and invited the rebels to send a delegation to meet to negotiate at 24 hours at the headquarters of the Cabildo of Buenos Aires or at the headquarters of the Supreme Court of Justice. Also the general Lucero read Perón's letter over radio and television. However, that same night Perón met with the military junta to inform them that he had not resigned; the junta was not dissolved, however. The rebels did not trust the appointment of the military junta and Admiral Isaac Francisco Rojas, in command of the warships in operations, issued a radiogram proposing that the government delegation go to the flagship of the fleet, the cruiser La Argentina. The delegation composed of Generals Forcher, Sampayo, Sacheri and Manni embarked at 2:00 p.m. on the 20th on the tracker Robinson bound for Río Santiago. The conversations between the envoys of the Junta and the representatives of the revolutionaries that were originally going to take place in Río Santiago were moved to the 17 de Octubre cruiser. At that point in the events the Junta was aware of its powerlessness to resist the coup d'état, especially because forces until then loyal to the government decided to suspend the repression until there were new authorities and was only looking for a decent way out that did not include the mention of an unconditional surrender; Once the agreement formula was agreed upon in the early hours of September 21, at 9:40 a.m. a statement was issued stating "The Military Junta, by virtue of the authority it assumed following the resignation of His Excellency the President of the Nation, has reached a full agreement with the opposition command, accepting the points stipulated with its representatives. On September 22, the retired division general Eduardo Lonardi will take charge of the provisional government. Although he had formed the provisional government in Córdoba on September 20, he was sworn in on September 23, 1955, accompanied by Julio Lagos and Isaac Rojas.
