= Maurrassisme in Argentina =

Far-right political movement

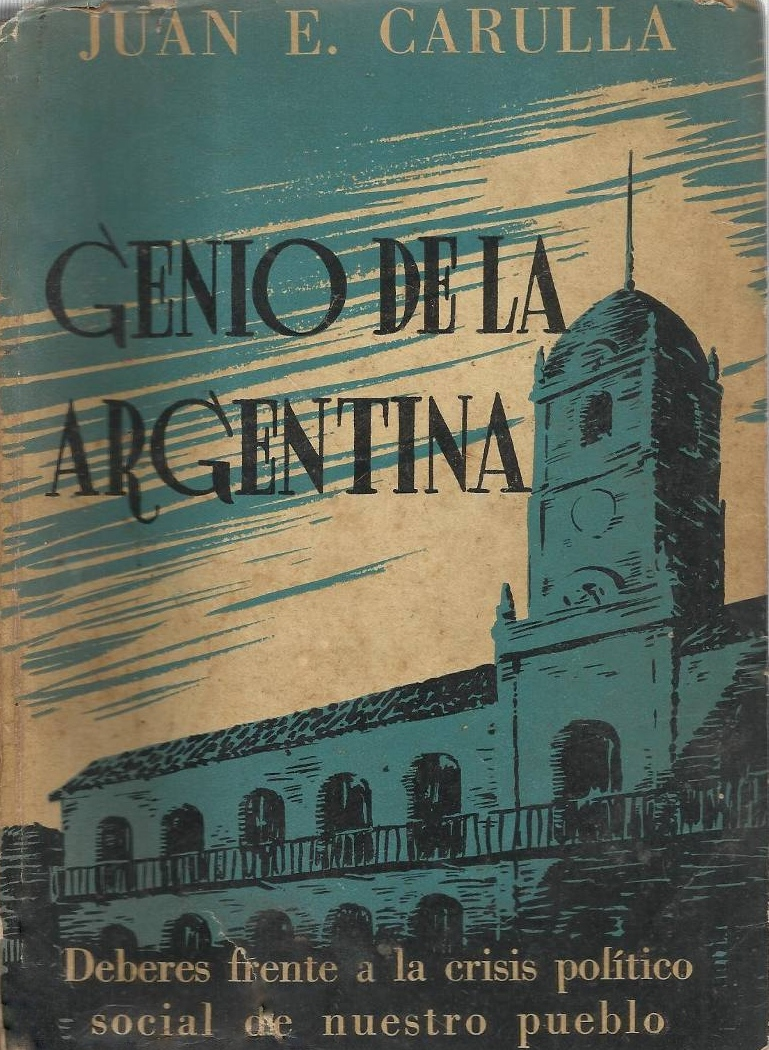
Cover of Genio de la Argentina (1943) by Juan Emiliano Carulla, depicting the Cabildo of Buenos Aires.

Maurrassisme in Argentina is a far-right political movement aimed at establishing an integral nationalist authoritarian state in Argentina following the ideology of French thinker Charles Maurras.

Maurrassisme was, along with panhispanism, the most important ideological precedent of the development of nacionalismo. Acknowledging the lack of monarchist claims over the country, most of Argentine maurrassistes supported an authoritarian and anti-liberal traditionalist state similar to the dictatorship of Juan Manuel de Rosas over the 19th-century Argentine Confederation.

Except for extremely rare cases, Latin American maurrassistes were intransigent defenders of the Catholic Church as the official and only religion of Hispanic peoples. After Maurras was condemned by the Holy See, many relevant figures of early Argentine maurrassisme would drift towards Catholic integralism, what has been pointed out as evidence of the importance held by religion within the movement. Argentine thinkers identified the maurrasian pays réel with the Catholic and militarist identity of the nation, in contrast to the fictional pays légal created by secular politicians that promoted "marxist atheism". The views of Argentine maurrassisme may have influenced José Félix Uriburu religious policies.

== Schools ==
Aside from strictly orthodox maurrassistes and those who can not be classified in any particular tradition, the Argentine variant of the movement can be roughly divided in two main schools or "genealogies" which adapted Maurras' ideas to the country's context using different selective readings.

=== Traditionalist school ===
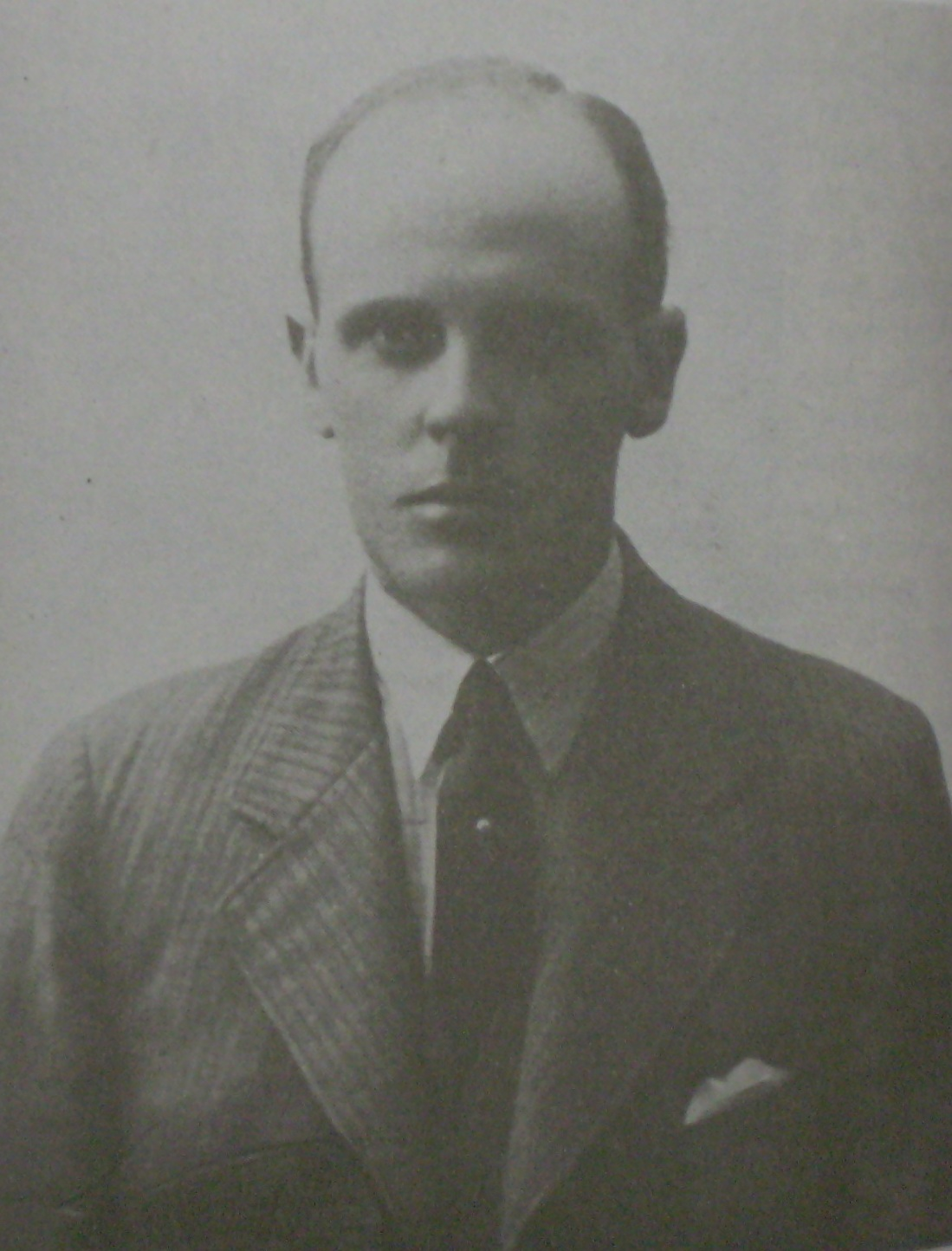
Tomás Darío Casares, writer at La Nueva República and important figure of the first-generation traditionalist school (unknown date)

The first of them was the "traditionalist" (Spanish: Tradicionalista), which was based on Maurras' most integralist views and aimed at organizing the whole of society on Catholic standards. Believing Roman Catholicism to be "the only and true religion", traditionalists wanted to build a theocratic state in which all spheres of public life were subordinated to religion. Particularly emphatic of maurrasian historiography, the movement stressed the decadence of the western civilization since the Reformation, a situation aggravated by the advent of the French and Russian revolutions. Staunch defenders of elitism and hierarchy, traditionalists did not accept any form of popular participation in the government and considered Catholicism to be utterly incompatible with any of the political developments of liberalism. Started by writers César Pico and Tomás Darío Casares, the movement's emphasis in Maurras grew stronger after the papal ban on Action Française was lifted in 1939 and the author's conversion to Catholicism was made public. The second generation of traditionalism was impulsed by Catholic priest Mario Pinto, who considered Maurras "a guardian of the highest values of Christian civilization".

The traditionalist trend attempted to reconcile maurrasianism with Neo-Thomism. Pinto associated both methods by describing the "classical spirit of order" they shared and appealing to Henri Massis' analysis of Maurras in Maurras et notre temps, while most cautious Catholic figures such as Julio Meinvielle vindicated the maurrasian body of thought but subordinated it to Thomistic doctrine, considering the former to be incomplete. Other thinkers defended Maurras as an "ally" to Catholicism in combatting liberalism and socialism, and adopted his thought as a "third alternative" to the two poles of the Cold War. Cordoban publication La Nueva Provincia, closely related to Thomas Molnar, defended such ideological system as "the most brilliant synthesis of traditionalist ideas in what has passed of this century". Traditionalist maurrassisme saw its popularity peak in the 1960s-1970s decades, as the papal ban had diminished its relevance in the interwar period.

=== Populist school ===
Flag of national-syndicalist Tacuara Nationalist Movement, in which some traditionalist figures such as Julio Meinvielle were involved.

The second school was the "populist" (Spanish: Populista), which vindicated Maurras' far-right nationalism and attempted to associate it to peronism. Despite most populist maurrassistes were Catholics, the role of religion was not as central as that of the nation, what has led to them being described as "better maurrasians" than the traditionalists. Their favourable views towards the populace and their lack of an idealized past, however, has been criticised as a significant ideological revision of the original system of thought. One of the most important exponents of the populist movement was Jacques-Marie de Mahieu, a post-war French exile in Argentina who, after drawing most of his political formation from Action Française during his youth, tried to expand his ideas at his new country while working as a professor at the National University of Cuyo. (Note: The National University of Cuyo, founded in the late 1930s, became an ideological center of Catholic nationalism and traditionalist maurrassisme after the 1943 Argentine coup d'état.) De Mahieu was close to the national-syndicalist Tacuara Nationalist Movement, in which he developed a conflictive relationship with traditionalist Julio Meinvielle, who considered him to be a communist.

De Mahieu wrote the prologue to the Prisoner's Soliloquy, Maurras' first published work in Argentina, in which he praised his figure as a theorist of "national revolutions" who could be useful to the development of peronism. Populist maurrassistes would eagerly embrace maurrasian national syndicalism, a trend mostly related to the Cercle Proudhon which attempted to fuse Maurras' reactionary criticism of modern capitalism with the ideas of Marxist Georges Sorel in order to create a third position between "liberal bourgeois individualism" and the "state collectivism of materialist socialism". De Mahieu considered Sorel a great complement to Maurras' ambiguous approach to the "proletarian problem": the synthesis of far-left and far-right criticisms of modern society was presented as a legitimation of Perón's third positionism, which could be supposedly traced back to René de la Tour du Pin economic views. In his article "The contemporary counter-encyclopedia: Maurras and Sorel", De Mahieu defended maurrasian economics as a way towards the development of a "national socialism".

== First introducers ==
As in other Latin American nations, maurrassisme was initially introduced into Argentina by upper-middle class students who were ideologically influenced by the movement's political elitism during their studies in Europe, particularly due to the widespread availability of Maurras' works in France. Such ideas had made their first appearance in Argentina in relation to the Dreyfus affair, but would not boom until the end of World War I, when the whole continent was experiencing the deep cultural changes associated with the abandonment of the liberal economic model and the emergence of cultural nationalism over elitist cosmopolitanism. The development of the movement was also fostered by the process of re-Catholicisation of Latin American intellectual elites after a century of dominant anti-clericalism.

Maurrasian thought was brought to Argentina firstly through the figures of Juan Emiliano Carulla and of Alfonso de Laferrère. Among the first Argentines to come in contact with Maurras' works, Carulla would serve as director to the first nacionalista magazine of the country, La Voz Nacional, and later found his own press media, Bandera Argentina. He would later forsake maurrassisme and nationalism, embracing regular Argentine conservatism and adopting a pro-American stance. Unlike most Argentine followers of the French thinker, Carulla was favourable to monarchism in the 1930s decade. De Laferrère, who considered himself an "orthodox maurrassiste", would be central in the conversion to the movement of his younger brother Roberto, who would play an important role in the latter years of the movement.

Alfonso had been a staunch supporter of the Allied Powers during World War I, and had experienced his first ventures into journalism as a harsh critic of Hipólito Yrigoyen's radical government. After travelling to Europe in 1920, he would develop an active interest in Maurras' thought, whom he would consider "his master", and commit to propagate his ideas among the Argentine nationalist right. In 1923, De Laferrère founded the Política magazine along with Julio Noé, in which, aside from attempted literary criticisms, he vindicated Maurras' integral nationalism for "his monarchist doctrine of unsurpassed vigor", "his criticism of romanticism, developed with surprising dialectical virtue" and "his classical conception of the City and of Beauty". The young thinker also railed against the figure of John Maynard Keynes, in whom he saw a "disastrous apostle of the primacy of the economic and political". Alfonso renounced his pro-Allied position during the interwar period and ranted against Woodrow Wilson whom, due to his "evangelical and kantian education", had supposedly planned an excessively idealistic solution to World War I and paved the way for a "repetition of the tragedy". Maurrasian influence made De Laferrère follow a positivist comtean approach to politics over an idealistic one, espouse a contempt for economic interests despite defending private property, denounce the irrational character of romanticism in favor of classicism, defend outward anglophobic and germanophobic views, and criticize the Treaty of Versailles.

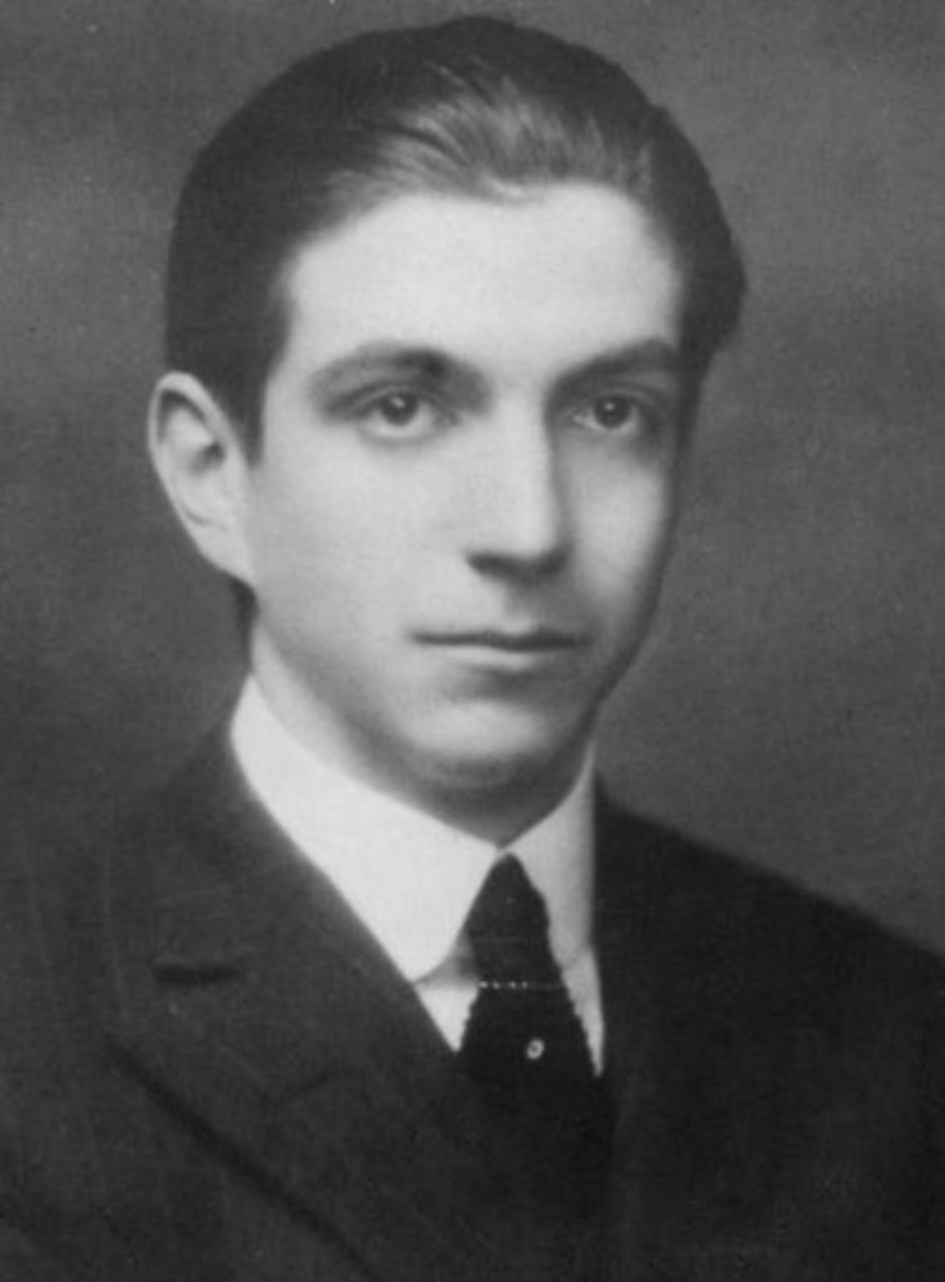
Julio Irazusta as a young man (1899–1982)

Two of the most relevant introducers of maurrassisme in Argentina were brothers Rodolfo and Julio Irazusta. After a four-years trip to Europe in which they lived at Spain, Italy and France, they came into contact with Maurras and were fascinated with his system of thought. Previously followers of radicalism and supporters of the Radical Civic Union, the impact of Maurras in their political formation was extensive. Julio would write numerous articles in praise of the French author on Argentine press media, considering him to be the restorer of the "eternal truths of politics" and the "most extraordinary journalist of all ages and places". Nevertheless, Irazusta did not follow Maurras' royalist ideals integrally, but aimed to adapt them to Argentina through the organizational empiricist method of analysis devised by the philosopher. In 1952, after Maurras' death, Julio wrote an article vindicating his figure as "the first of citizens of his time" and organized a commemorative in memoriam event in 1972, to which renowned intellectual and political figures such as Julio Meinvielle or Marcelo Sánchez Sorondo attended. Julio Irazusta was favorable to a monarchical form of government, while Rodolfo supported a non-democratic republicanism based on corporatist principles. Opposing the "republic" to ochlocratic democracy (similarly to the aristotelian view of politics), Rodolfo Irazusta would claim that "the Argentine state is Catholic in its origin and its constitution. Democracy is by nature anti-Catholic. Democracy is incompatible with argentine institutions". Latter Argentine maurrassistes would promote an illiberal republic, supposedly based on classical politics expressed in Cicero's De Re Publica, using as a motto that "democracy is not in the constitution".

Decades later, Irazusta would translate to Spanish Mes idées politiques and L'Avenir de l'intelligence and publish them in Argentina in 1962 and 1965.

== Early media and thought ==
=== La Nueva República ===
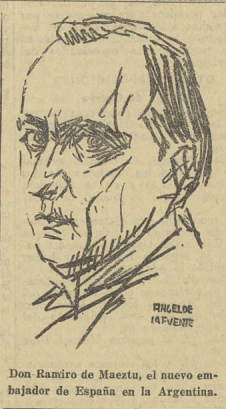
1927 caricature of Ramiro de Maeztu at El Liberal, upon his appointment as ambassador to Argentina.

Back to Argentina in 1927, the Irazusta brothers founded the La Nueva República (lit. 'The New Republic') newspaper, of which renowned figures of right-wing Argentine nationalism such as Ernesto Palacio, Tomás Darío Casares or Juan Emiliano Carulla himself would become frequent writers. Staunchly anti-liberal, the publication served as a means for Argentine far-right intellectuals to come into contact with Spanish Catholic intellectual and diplomat Ramiro de Maeztu, who was staying in the country during his term as ambassador at Buenos Aires of the dictatorship of Primo de Rivera. La Nueva República finished its activities in 1931, after president Hipólito Yrigoyen was overthrown by a military coup d'état.

Ramiro de Maeztu named Maurras among his intellectual precursors, along with other integral nationalist figures such as António Sardinha or Henri Massis, and Catholic thinkers such as G. K. Chesterton and Hilaire Belloc. After joining the Patriotic Union in 1927, the only party of the Spanish dictatorship, he was quickly assigned to the embassy in Argentina, what has been pointed out as a possible strategical maneuver by Primo de Rivera in order to remove him from the country considering his extremely reactionary points of view.

Catholic integralist magazine Criterio welcomed his arrival as "the best gift that the Motherland has given us for a long time", while left-leaning media such as El Día or Nosotros criticized his designation. La Nueva República expressed great enthusiasm at his arrival, stating the dictatorship "could not have chosen better" a figure to foster relations between Spain and Hispanic America. (Note: Maeztu was the author of Defensa de la Hispanidad, considered one of the founding texts of panhispanism. He greatly helped to popularize the concept of Hispanidad and asserted a considerable influence over the Latin-American far right.) Unlike virtually all Argentine maurrassistes, Maeztu would develop favourable views towards Hipólito Yrigoyen, with whom he held a cordial relationship. The Spanish author admired the president's political style, comparing it to that of Juan Manuel de Rosas. Neo-republicans would regularly share meetings with Maeztu at the Spanish embassy, through which the Spanish author asserted a great influence over the young men's thought. The nationalist newspaper would be the first of most Argentine right-wing political groups to embrace the Basque thinker's ideas. Despite Maeztu did not adhere to strictly maurrasian nationalism but to a National Catholic view of such concept, in which religion functioned as a prevalent unifying force, his ideological positions were quickly incorporated to Argentine maurrasian thought. Julio Irazusta compared his panhispanist views to the "counter-revolutionary programme" of Enquête sur la monarchie, one of the most renowned works by Maurras. The prevalence of Maeztu's religious nationalism over Maurras' ethnonationalism was a central aspect of neo-republicanism, as expressed by Irazusta in 1931:

For the Latin, and therefore Spanish, criterion, racial affinity does not derive only from blood. The races that form Latinity are nothing but the superposition of new ethnic layers that have come to build their identity through a bond much stronger than that of blood transfusion: through spiritual unity. [If for the Spaniards] race did not exist in blood but in baptism [and] what unites the Spaniards and the Americans more than blood and language is religion, [the consequence is that] those who commit themselves to destroying the religious sentiment of our people, mixed with all the patriotic feelings, they undertake to destroy the strongest and most noble bond that unites our society.

Neo-republicans would subsequently reject accusations of fascism. As Federico Ibarguren stated in 1969

we, young revolutionaries (anti-liberal, but with autonomous bases) of the 1930 generation of 'fascist' had very little, very little. We were, on the other hand, 'Lugonian' to the bone in those distant times of La Nueva República. Being 'Lugonian' is different from being a 'fascist'. Evidently. Fascism as a theory was generated in a laboratory of intellectuals with the socialist sperm–totalitarian and secular–of the twentieth century; instead Argentine nationalism feeds on the ancient Hispanic cult of the personality, where the Catholic tradition sprouts like a well watered seed under the earth.

The great influence asserted by Catholic traditionalism over the movement led to its description as a "tempered maurrassisme". Still, the local archbishop Santiago Copello would describe La Nueva República as the "Argentine Action Française".

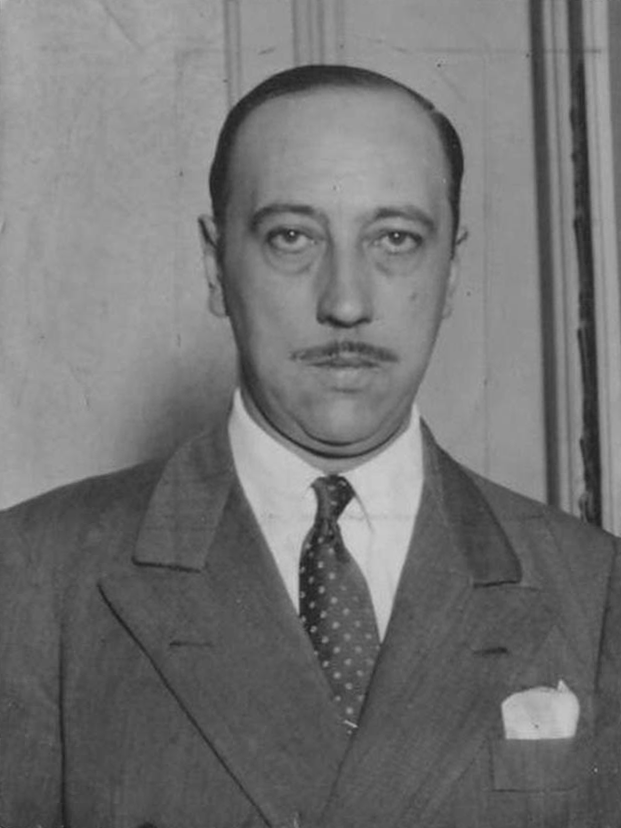
Ernesto Palacio, editor-in-chief of La Nueva República (1900–1979)

Ernesto Palacio, the editor-in-chief of La Nueva República, would become one of the main exponents of maurrasian thought in the country. After a youth of militant anarchism, Palacio converted to Roman Catholicism and became an enthusiast of counter-revolutionary philosophy. An attendant to the 1972 event organized by Irazusta, Palacio elaborated his own nationalist political theory based on classicism and authoritarianism. His views were deeply critical of liberal democracy, particularly against those he called "demagogic excesses" of Argentine radicalism.

Palacio attacked the politicians of his time as motivated by "a systematic denigration of what is ours, of the national, for the benefit of what is foreign". The author, considering Argentine society to be deeply deviant, subsequently attempted a meticulous study of history in order to find the country's "origin and destiny" which would lead to the formulation of his restorationist program. (Note: The careful analysis of history in order to determine the most convenient political actions and elaborate an ideology that fits a nation's identity is a pillar of maurrasian positivist thought. This process was also mentioned previously regarding Irazusta's views.) Palacio blamed the national decadence on the liberal notion of progress, which had supposedly abolished the "religious strength and chivalric idealism" present in traditional societies, and attacked the independentist revolution as having dissolved traditional social coexistence in order to install an egalitarian and secular state in which capitalism, characterized as "the Golden Calf", could thrive. Identically to French maurrassistes, La Nueva República blamed the implementation of democracy and capitalism on an alliance between protestans, freemasons and Jews. The addition of foreigners to this triad composes the maurrassian doctrine of the Anti-France.

Palacio considered decadence to be fostered by the destruction of the old aristocracy and its replacement by the bourgeoisie, naturally unfit for authority and command due to its obsession with wealth. Individualism and economic liberalism, incarnated in the values of Romanticism and of the French Revolution, were portrayed as central factors of the moral crisis and as harmful to hierarchy, the natural order and the Catholic Church. After decades of "cultural barbarism" caused by the abandonment of the Latin and Christian civilization and the promotion of a vulgar and disordered worldview, the "spiritual counter-revolution" was to be carried out by an aristocratic nationalist elite with enough political will to search for the common good. Palacio's model state would be based on a "natural political order, preexistent to any political contract" and composed of a personalista leader and an aristocratic ruling class which would govern the country authoritatively while upkeeping "republican virtues and morals".

The specific function of the ruling class is to govern, that of the people is to comply. This implies a certain moral identification of the people with the ruling class...when the ruling class ceases to represent the community because it closes itself to its desires, because it does not renew itself at the pace of social progress, of natural changes in ideas and customs, because it rejects new values, and endangers the common destiny, the community stops recognizing itself in it and in its principles, that no longer mean anything, and seeks to express itself through other means.

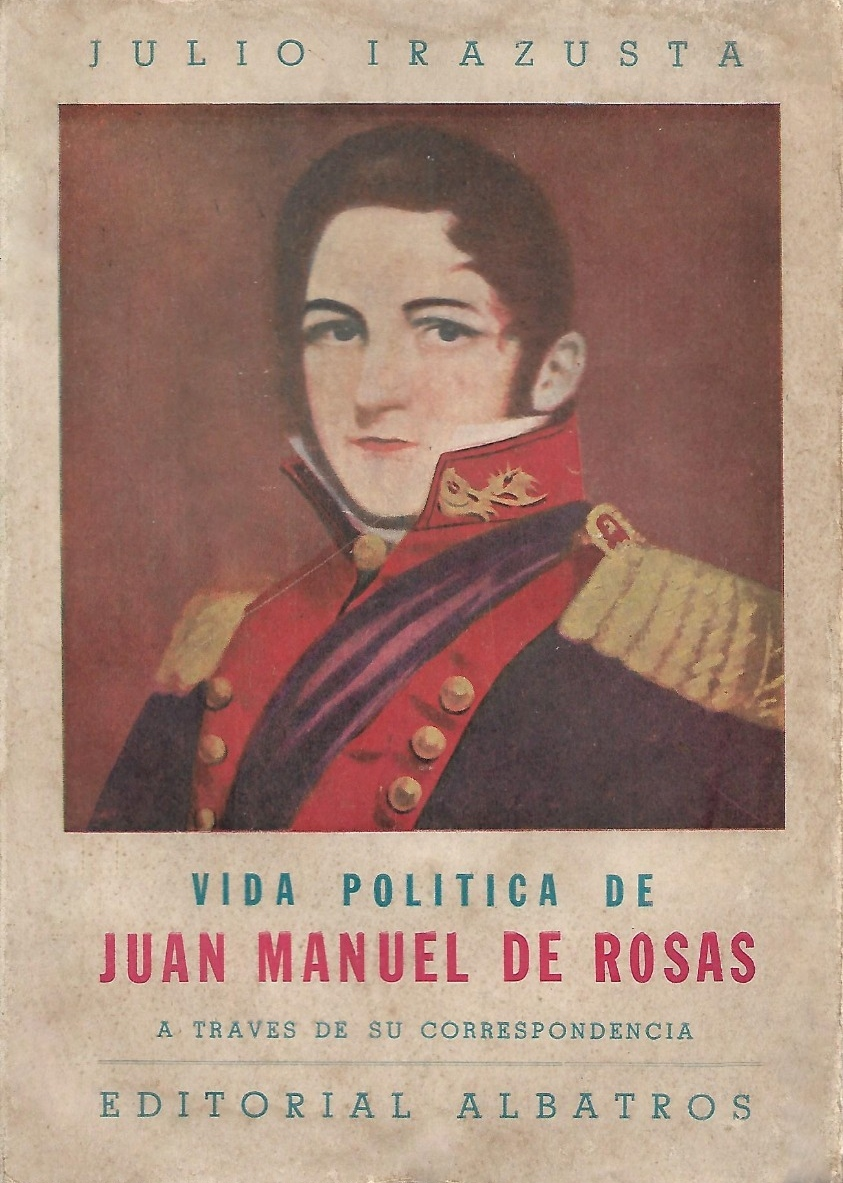
Depiction of dictator Juan Manuel de Rosas, archetype of the Argentine caudillo, on the cover of Political life of Juan Manuel de Rosas by Julio Irazusta (1953)

Palacio considered that an actually "democratic" leadership could not be achieved but through a caudillo who, as an authentic "representative of the people", would "inspire confidence, respect and love". Political order would not be based on legalistic principles, but would emerge naturally out of a naturally ordered society. The ruling class was to be an educated political class, not an economic one, and would represent the community through its identification with traditional values, culture and customs, and by "responding to the predominant moral and intellectual influxes in the community". Palacio did not view Argentine nationalism as a modern ideology but as a restoration of the classical canons of the Catholic Hispanic political tradition that had been betrayed in favor of "anglo-saxon liberalism". The revitalization of a system based on the common good, on "order, authority and hierarchy" and on elitism would restore traditional principles that liberal democracy had abandoned in order to establish industrial capitalism. Palacio praised Joseph de Maistre's analysis of the French Revolution and supported an integralist conception of lawmaking, stating that "men cannot dictate their own laws because their autonomous conscience threatens the Christian order". Calling democracy the "material ruin and spiritual death" of the country, Palacio asked all Catholics to "search the advent of the temporal kingship of Christ" He would deny his maurrasian beliefs during its period of condemnation by the Catholic Church, stating that "as Catholics, we could not adhere and did not adhere to a figure whose doctrine was condemned by the infallible head of the Church", and return to the movement once the ban was lifted.

=== La Fronda ===
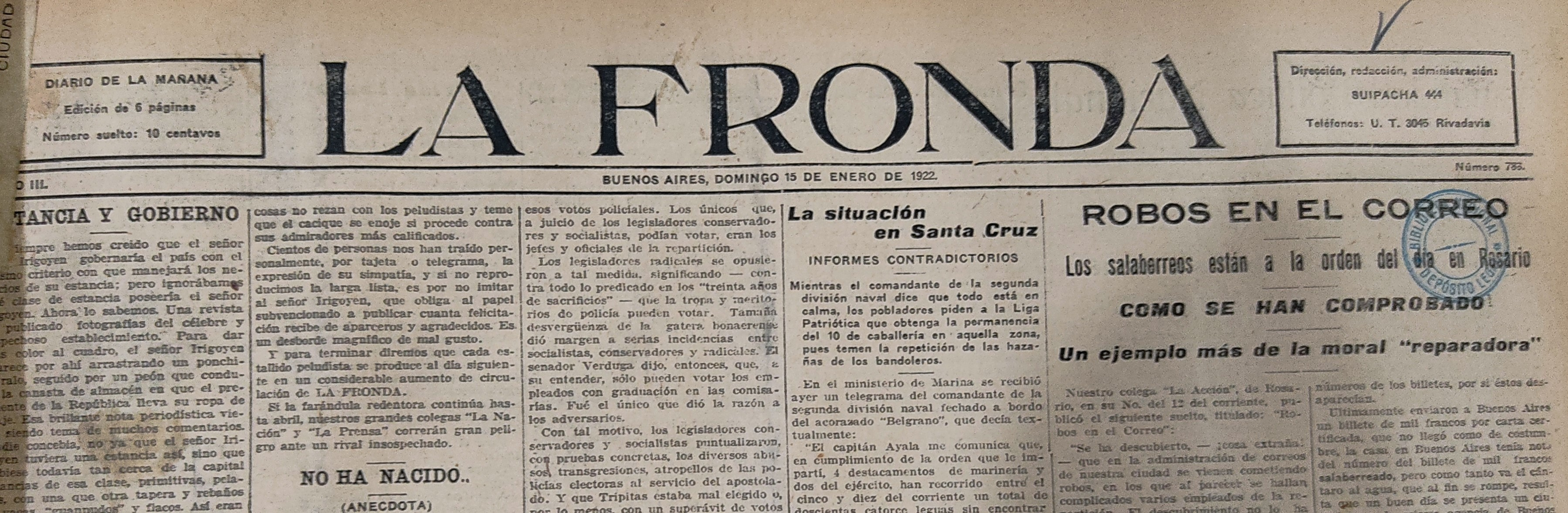
15 January 1922 edition of La Fronda, before the far-right takeover of the newspaper.

La Fronda (lit. 'The Frond') was a conservative newspaper led by Francisco Uriburu, an anti-Yrigoyenist politician who had supported the Anti-Personalist Radical Civic Union and strived to create a "republican system" free "of the distortions" introduced by Yrigoyen. (Note: Not to be confused with Francisco Uriburu, who had died in 1906.) After the defeat of anti-personalism in the 1928 Argentine general election and the comeback to power of Hipólito Yrigoyen, Uriburu decided to adopt a considerably more belligerent and combative style, and decided to grant space in his newspaper to other young anti-Yrigoyenist journalists. These new collaborators were recruited from maurrasian La Nueva República and Catholic integralist Criterio, some of which had already came into contact with the publication after Justo Pallarés Acebal became its editor-in-chief in 1926.

Neo-republicans Rodolfo Irazusta, Ernesto Palacio, Juan Carulla and Lisardo Zía were part of the former group, while other maurrassistes such as Roberto de Laferrère had already been collaborating with Uriburu for a long time. Despite Uriburu's political views differed greatly from those of his new partners, his staunch hatred for Yrigoyenism compelled him to allow the radicalization of his newspaper. After 1929, due to his prolonged absence during his long trips to Europe, the young maurrassistes took over La Fronda's editorial direction and turned it into an explicitly anti-democratic and maurrasian publication, which would have a great influence in the country's future events.

== 1930 coup d'état ==
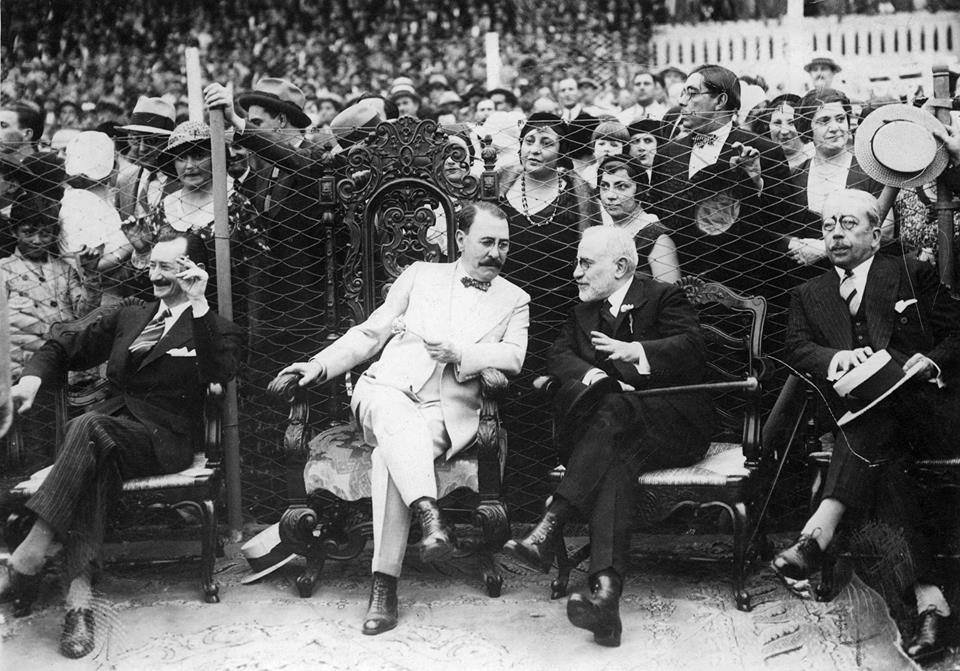
Dictator José Félix Uriburu watching a Newell's Old Boys vs Unión de Santa Fe football match. Maurrassiste writer Leopoldo Lugones can be seen on the right side of the picture.

In September 1929, the neo-republicans in charge of La Fronda founded the Republican League (Spanish: Liga Republicana), a violent organisation resembling the Camelots du Roi, with the objective of carrying out anti-Yrigoyenist activism in the streets. Almost all collaborators of La Fronda were enlisted in the movement. Financed personally by Uriburu (despite not adhering to maurrasisme), the League was committed to fight "with their own methods" against the Radical Klan (Spanish: Klan Radical), a violent urban militant group at the service of the Radical Civic Union. Despite Uriburu believed the League should have worked as a complementary force to partisan and parliamentary opposition, leaguists adopted an explicitly anti-democratic rhetoric and sought violent militant activities as a way of overcoming "obsolete" parliamentary politics. These extremist points of view would undermine the League's recruitment capabilities. The movement explicitly claimed to follow the model of the 1905 Ligue d'Action Française.

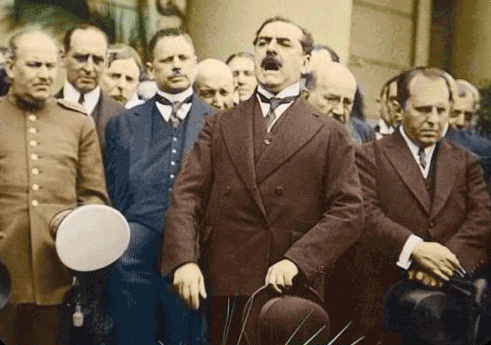
Manuel Carlés, leader of the Argentine Patriotic League, whose candidacy Rodolfo Irazusta supported (1920s decade)

In the 1930 Argentine legislative election, most leaguists decided to support the main anti-Yrigoyenist candidates in their particular districts without attempting a common front. The failure of Rodolfo Irazusta's project to form a coalition with the Argentine Patriotic League and some independent socialists under the leadership of Manuel Carlés and Leopoldo Lugones led to his eventual resignment from the Republican League. (Note: Despite its name and rhetoric, the Independent Socialist Party was rather liberal-conservative ideologically.) Despite the elections showed a certain decline of yrigoyenism, it was not enough to cause the expected changes in the country's political scenario, what caused Argentine nationalists to search for a different way of removing radicalism from power. Still in Europe, Uriburu started to look into the three political conspirations different sectors were developing in order to oust the president. His cousin José Félix Uriburu, an army general, wanted to overthrow Yrigoyen to a revolutionary nationalist coup d'état and take power by force. Vice-president Enrique Martínez entertained the possibility of causing Yrigoyen's resignment and taking power by constitutional succession, while general Agustín Pedro Justo devised a plan to take power with the support of anti-Yrigoyenist political parties. Francisco was closer to the latter initiative, but the neo-republicans of La Fronda supported José Félix, who finally became dictator on September 6, after the 1930 Argentine coup d'état. José Félix Uriburu was a subscriber of La Nueva República.

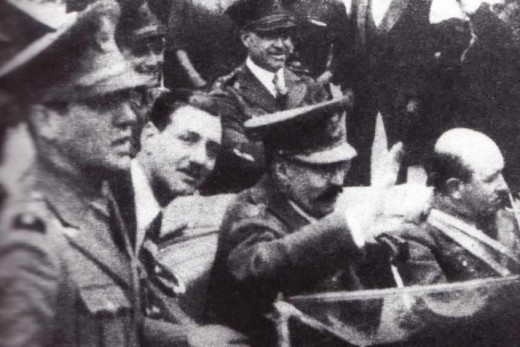
José Félix Uriburu (September 1930), driving to take power, surrounded by his supporters. Future nationalist president Juan Perón can be seen on the left side of the picture.

La Fronda played a crucial role in the coup, both through actively calling civilians to revolt and through the violent actions of the Republican League and of the May Legion (Spanish: Legión de Mayo), another civilian militia in which neo-republicans like Carulla, de Laferrère, Eduardo Muñiz or Héctor Bustamante took part. Unlike the Republican League, the Legion's connection to La Fronda was not so clear. An initiative suggested by Uriburu himself and formally founded by conservative deputy Alberto Viñas, the Legion had started its activities in 1930 in the context of the general's conspiracy, to whom it was subordinated.

La Fronda celebrated the coup and praised the League for its collaboration. Once Yrigoyen was finally ousted, the newspaper became a zealous defender of the ephemeral dictatorship and abandoned definitively any liberal-conservative remainder in its ideology. Openly approving and vindicating Uriburu's suppression of constitutional rights, neo-republicans supported the dictator's desire to abolish universal suffrage in Argentina. La Fronda had not promoted corporate statism up to the coup, so the news of its implementation by the recently established regime were received cautiously. The newspaper had already proposed a reformation of voting rights through the implementation of restricted suffrage by "education and morals" and the suppression of secret ballots. However, after the defeat of nationalism in Buenos Aires in the 1931 regional elections, La Fronda became a vocal supporter of corporatism and asked the government to ignore all electoral results until the new system was implemented. After the first results of the elections were published, the newspaper called to

[...] form a league of armed patriots, a holy brotherhood of decent people, willing to contain by whatever means appropriate the overwhelming advance of the horde of outlaws [...] yes to batons, no to votes!

Few days later, the government created the Argentine Civic Legion as a violent militant organization at the service of the government. The Legion attempted to absorb other nationalist associations, what caused a division in the Republican League: while Carulla accepted to be fused with the governmental group, de Laferrère wanted to remain independent. La Fronda, institutionally, supported the creation of two new militant organizations aimed at supporting the Uriburu administration and impeding the dictatorship to "deviate from its original course". The first of them was Reacción Nacional (lit. 'National Reaction'), to which Ernesto Palacio, Justo Pallarés Acebal, Lisardo Zía and other relevant figures quickly adhered. The second was Acción Republicana (lit. 'Republican Action'), based upon a manifesto written by Leopoldo Lugones and signed by the Irazusta brothers, César Pico, Mario Lassaga and all the above.

In spite of the nationalists' efforts, the dictator disregarded their proposals and called to a new election. After Francisco Uriburu returned from Europe, he reorganized La Fronda in order to support the liberal-conservative candidacy of Agustín Justo and Julio Argentino P. Roca. Francisco Uriburu did not think the revolution had failed, and actively collaborated with the Infamous Decade regime, even becoming a deputy by the conservatives. His nationalist collaborators, on the other hand, considered José Félix Uriburu had failed in destroying liberal democratic institutions, and withdrew their support for the government.

== Inter-peronist years ==
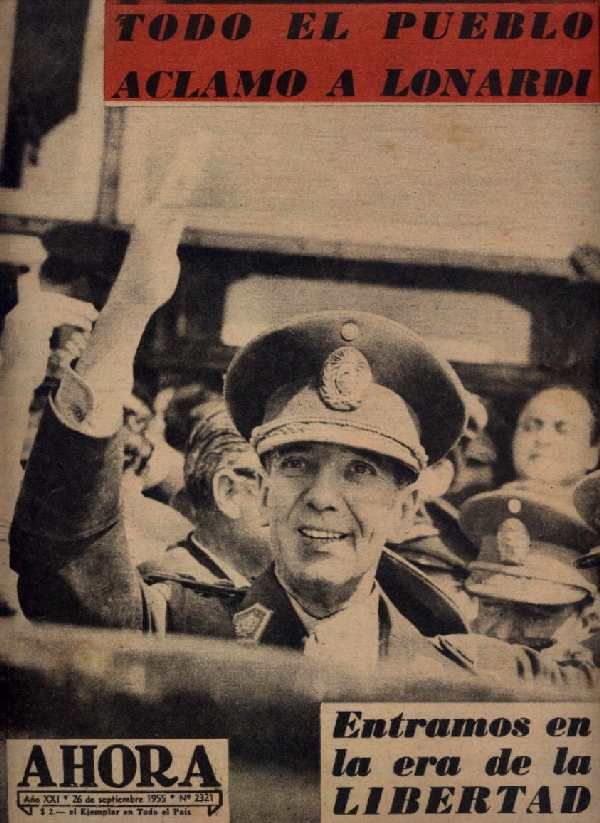
General Eduardo Lonardi after the 1955 Argentine coup d'état. The cover of the magazine reads "The whole people acclaimed Lonardi/We are entering the age of freedom".

After the ousting of Juan Perón by the Liberating Revolution, maurrassisme found its place among the nationalist sectors of the coup that had supported Eduardo Lonardi, the general who would subsequently assume power for a few months up November 1955, when he was supplanted by the liberal-conservative Pedro Eugenio Aramburu. One of the main nationalist media that incorporated maurrasian style and terminology was Azul y Blanco, directed by Marcelo Sánchez Sorondo, that repeatedly denied its maurrassiste character due to the great discredit suffered by the movement, and preferred to identify with the ideas of Maurice Barrès. Azul y Blanco reinstated the pays réel-pays légal dichotomy on religious grounds, and counted with the contributions of Jean-Henri Azéma, an old member of Action Française exiled in Buenos Aires due to his nazi collaborationism. The influence of Maurras was evident in the newspaper's ideological claims. Azul y Blanco was closed by the government during its popularity peak due to its aggressive criticism of president Arturo Frondizi, whom it labeled as communist. The most intransigent faction of Azul y Blanco restarted the publication in 1966, year in which general Juan Carlos Onganía would launch the Argentine Revolution and depose president Umberto Illia. The journalists were initially welcoming of the coup and defended it enthusiastically, despite their gradual disillusionment was made evident by 1967, when criticism of the government became the main topic of the medium. A faction led by Sánchez Sorondo, of which Juan Manuel Abal Medina and the son of Ernesto Palacio were members, created the Movimiento de la Revolución Nacional in order to negotiate their agenda with prominent politicians, while the most radical members of the staff abandoned Azul y Blanco and founded the Junta Coordinadora Nacionalista, which adopted a traditionalist ideology. After Perón returned to Argentina relations between both groups grew particularly hostile, specially after the moderates decided to join the FREJULI.

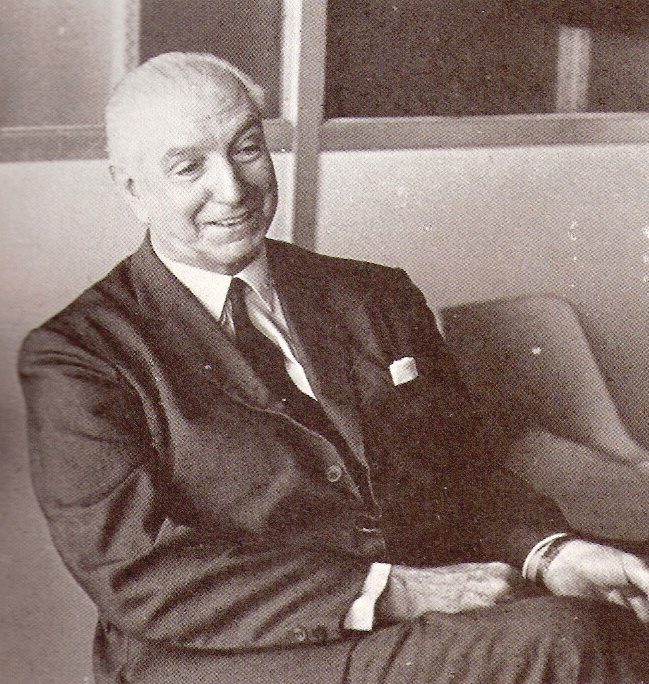
Julio Irazusta as an old man (June 1976)

In spite of their political differences, most influential Argentine maurrasian figures gathered together in the 1972 "Argentine Commission of Tribute to Charles Maurras on the XXth anniversary of his death" (Spanish: Comisión Argentina de Homenaje a Charles Maurras en el XX aniversario de su muerte). Led by Julio Irazusta and Alberto Falcionelli, the commission was composed of extremely heterogeneous figures and counted with the membership of Enrique Zuleta Álvarez, Ernesto Palacio and his son Juan Manuel, Jean-Henri Azéma, Julio Meinvielle, Marcelo Sánchez Sorondo, Alberto Ezcurra Medrano and other renowned thinkers (Note: Cersósimo lists Julio Irazusta, Alberto Falcionelli, Federico and Vicente Massot, Julio Meinvielle, Hervé Le Lay, Mario Pinto, Raúl Sánchez Abelenda, Juan Carlos Goyeneche, Jean Azéma, Mario Amadeo, Carlos F. Ibarguren, Federico Ibarguren, Enrique Zuleta Puceiro, Enrique Zuleta Álvarez, Marcelo Sánchez Sorondo, Ernesto Palacio, Juan Manuel Palacio, Fermín Chávez, Nimio de Anquín, Carlos M. Dardan, Fernando de Estrada, Ignacio Anzoátegui, Roque Raúl Aragón, Luis Alberto Barnada, Francisco Bosch, Héctor Bernardo, Rubén Calderón Bouchet, Alberto Ezcurra Medrano, Rodolfo Follari, César Augusto Falciola, Maurice Lariviere, Bonifacio Lastra, Andre Laxague, Bernardino Montejano, Roberto Murga, Héctor Obligado, Ignacio Pirovano, Albert Paillard, Juan Manuel Medrano, Jean du Mazeau, Augusto Padilla, Antonio Rego, Alejandro Sáez Germain, Belisario Tello, Juan Carlos Villagra, Guillermo Zorraquín, Raúl Torres de Tolosa, Francisco Bellouard Ezcurra, Clodomiro Ledesma and Juan Antonio Urrestarazu Pizarro as all the known members, acknowledging the non-exhaustive nature of the study. The presence of French names and surnames is notable.) from all three schools of Argentine maurrassisme, but most particularly from the traditionalist one. The commemoration featured a series of conferences by renowned maurrasian authors between November 13 and 17, and a Catholic mass.

== Other late maurrasian thinkers ==
=== Alberto Falcionelli ===
Alberto Falcionelli (1910–1995) was a French legitimist monarchist and traditionalist Catholic who, after receiving most of his political formation in interwar Europe, travelled to Argentina once World War II had ended and served as professor at the University of Cuyo from 1947 to early 1970s. An influential figure of Catholic integralism in Argentina, Falcionelli taught Contemporary History and French Literature, and had the Soviet Union as his main academic interest. Unlike other anti-communist thinkers, who criticized marxism by defending capitalism, Falcionelli's criticism of communism was centered in his rejection of rationalism and of the Age of Enlightenment values.

Son to one of Maurras' secretaries and founding members of Action Française, Falcionelli would join both the political movement and the Camelots du Roi as a young man. Alberto considered Maurras to be the modern equivalent to Thomas Aquinas, and held a close relationship with the Eastern Orthodox community of the Alexander Nevsky Cathedral, mostly composed of exiles from the White Army, in which he started to develop his interest about Russia. Alberto considered Maurras his maître à penser from the age of 17 and never repudiated his ideas, to the point that during the papal ban on Action Française, both him and his father attended church services with the orthodox community. Falcionelli had at first fled to Spain, fearing reprisals against those who had sympathized with the Vichy Regime, and finally reached Argentina during Juan Perón's administration, which, due to his third positionist views, had become a popular destination for World War II French collaborationists.

Described as a member of the "reactionary French far-right", Falcionelli held tsarist positions and desired a restoration of the Romanov dynasty to power in Russia. Despite stating Perón had committed "a truly impressive cumulus of errors", he praised the president for "knowing how to keep the proletariat out of communist snares", acknowledging the relevance acquired by marxism in the Argentine intelligentsia after the 1955 coup.

=== Enrique Zuleta Álvarez ===
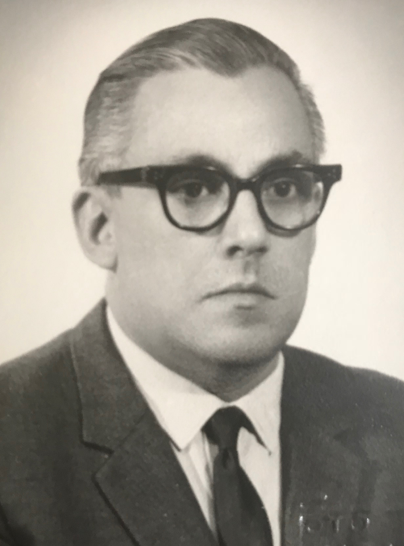
Enrique Zuleta Álvarez (1965)

Described as "the last of the maurrasians", Enrique Zuleta Álvarez was born in 1923 and died in 2015. A follower of Maurras, he also came into contact with carlist and neo-fascist figures during his frequent trips around the world.

His father, Enrique Manuel, was an yrigoyenist radical politician. Zuleta became a maurrassiste while still a highschool student through the works of brothers Irazusta. Younger than both, he would get acquainted with them and visit their home along with one of his classmates, where they would receive their first lessons of political philosophy. Due to his asthma problems, he moved from Buenos Aires to Mendoza around 1943, where he became a student and then a professor at the National University of Cuyo. During his study years, he became an active promoter of maurrassisme among his classmates, achieving the conversion to the movement of many of them. Among those was the future Catholic philosopher Rubén Calderón Bouchet, with whom he started a close friendship which was later broken.

Zuleta's maurrasian beliefs were supported by the arrival at the university of Falcionelli and De Mahieu, recently exiled from post-war France, both of whom helped greatly to popularize maurrassisme in the country. The former would be particularly influential over Zuleta's historiographical thought, while the latter's relevance at Mendoza was mild, particularly considering his conflictive relations with Falcionelli and his latter academic fall in disgrace after the 1955 anti-peronist revolution.

After his father joined the peronist movement, Zuleta's anti-peronism became a motive of conflict in his family. Despite Manuel tried to convince his son to support the new government, Enrique was firm in his irazustian views and rejected the regime. He could not take part in the 1955 revolution, nevertheless, due to a long trip to Francoist Spain he had started the previous year. During his stay in Europe, he came into contact both with francoism and with its growing ideological opponents. After returning to Argentina, he supported the maurrasian Unión Republicana political association created by brothers Irazusta, a decision he would later regret.

Rejecting any partisan political activity on the ground of his maurrasian beliefs, Zuleta collaborated as an independent politician with the Ministry of Education during the government of Arturo Frondizi. Despite considering his decision to be essentially pragmatic, the great hostility towards Frondizi by far-right Argentine nationalists led to clashes with other intellectual figures. He developed a friendly relationship with author Jorge Luis Borges during such years, and met fellow maurrassistes Manuel Vega (Chilean) and Luis Alberto Cabrales (Nicaraguan) during his travels around the world.

Zuleta became closer to the French far-right while writing his 1965 book "Introduction to Maurras", in which he continued exploring the texts and philosophers of the royalist tradition with the help of the Irazusta brothers. The Argentine thinker would become acquainted with the Cahiers Charles Maurras and with fellow maurrassiste and university dean François Natter. His enquiries drove him close to the restored Action Française, mostly through its publishing houses. Zuleta had already taken part in a far-right congress in Europe, in which he had engaged in conflicts with carlist representatives and met relevant French figures such as Roland Gaucher. After finishing his travels around Europe, Zuleta became rector of the University of Cuyo in 1981.

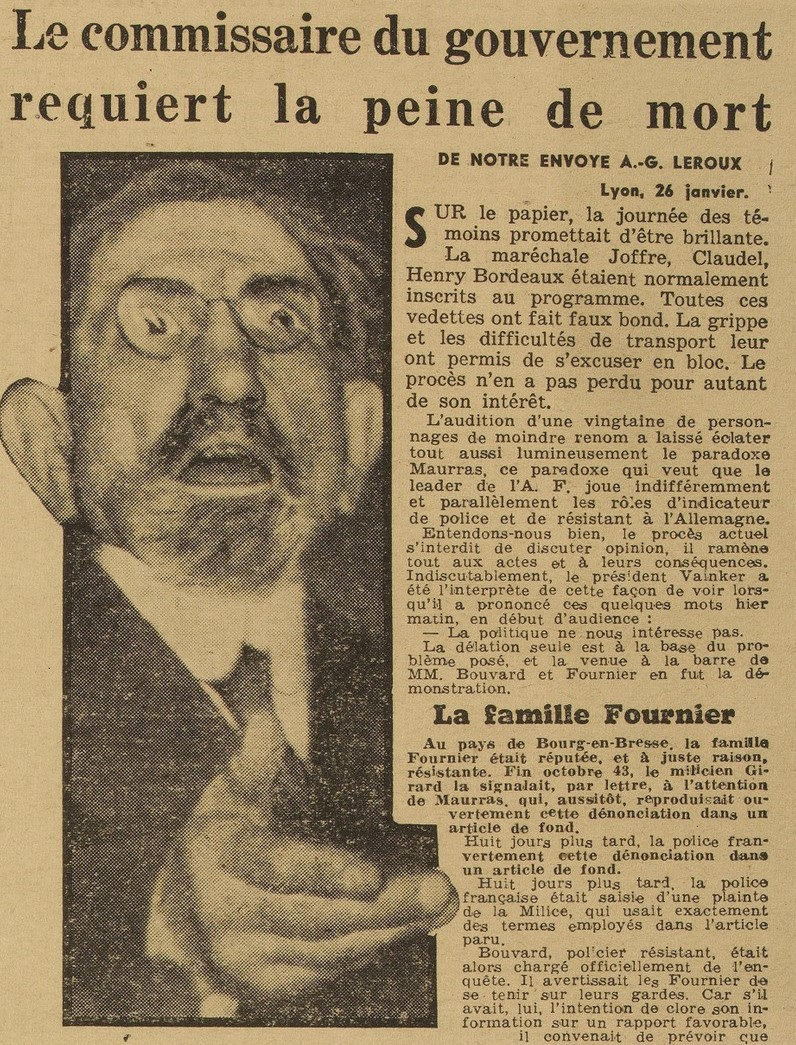
1945 newspaper showing Maurras during his trial and reporting the death penalty petition by his accusers.

Zuleta praised Maurras continuously, describing him as his intellectual "father", as the "most important political thinker arousen in France in the last two centuries, and one of the greatest figures of western literature and thought of all ages". The Argentine author applauded him as playing an "almost prophetic" role, idealizing his views and being particularly emphatic on the "notre force est d'avoir raison" ("our strength is to be right") maurrasian principle. As other Argentine maurrassistes, Zuleta considered an authoritarian republican regime to be the most fit to the country's context through the organizational empiricist method, and described himself as a "republican nationalist" in order to distinguish his ideas from rather intransigent figures such as Julio Meinvielle. Zuleta also attempted to give his ideas a Hispanic framework as an answer to a common criticism faced by the Irazusta brothers which portrayed them as afrancesado and hypocritical nationalists. The defense of hispanidad and of the Roman Catholic religion as a unifying factor of Argentine society became a central aspect of his body of thought.

On a 2010 interview, soon before his death, Zuleta praised the French thinker by stating that

...I used to read Aspects de la France, I used to read Maurras; I was informed about the world by Maurras until the day he died. The day he died, for me it was as if a father, a grandfather, had died; I was devastated that day because he was my great intellectual guide.

Regarding Maurras' relationship with the house of Orléans, in line with his republican sympathies, Zuleta would then say:

...such was Maurras' tragedy because Maurras, in the end, concluded that he was working to return the Pretender to the throne and we know very well that the Pretender was a poor man, almost non-existent. So, all this enormous fuss [had been undertaken] for this wretched man to come to rule the Capetian throne.

== See also ==
- Acción Española
- Argentine Patriotic League
- Fascism in Uruguay
- French interventions in Mexico
- Integralismo Lusitano
- Integral state
- Monarchism in Brazil
- Monarchism in Mexico
- Monarchism in Uruguay
- Nazism in Chile
- Orthodox Peronism
- Pan-Latinism
- Patrianovism

== Bibliography ==
- Botti, Alfonso; Lvovich, Daniel (2020). "Ramiro de Maeztu between Spanish and Argentinian nationalism" (PDF). In Galimi, Valeria; Gori, Annarita (eds.). Intellectuals in the Latin space during the era of fascism: crossing borders. Routledge studies in modern history. London: Routledge. pp. 35–56. ISBN 978-1-138-48266-1.
- Cersósimo, Facundo (2017). "Charles Maurras y los nacionalistas argentinos: Recepción y "usos" en los años posperonistas" (PDF). Prismas (in Spanish) (21): 95–113.
- Cesana, Maria Eugenia; Fantino, Juan Francisco (2016). "Una mirada maurrasiana desde la Argentina: Las interpretaciones de Alberto Falcionelli sobre la Revolución china de 1949, el tercer mundo y los procesos de descolonización". Épocas (in Spanish) (14): 87–138. ISSN 2250-6292.
- Compagnon, Olivier (2009). "Le maurrassisme en Amérique latine: Etude comparée des cas argentin et brésilien". In Dard, Olivier; Grunewald, Michel (eds.). Charles Maurras et l'étranger - L'étranger et Charles Maurras (in French). Peter Lang. pp. 283–305. ISBN 978-3-0343-0039-1.
- Cucchetti, Humberto (2019-12-17). "Eslabones perdidos en el universo de las derechas argentinas: Enrique Zuleta Álvarez, el último de los maurrasianos". Anuario IEHS (in Spanish). 34 (2): 237–253. ISSN 2524-9339.
- Díaz Nieva, José (2010). "Apuntes para un estudio de la influencia de Maurras en Hispanoamérica" (PDF). Anales de la Fundación Francisco Elías de Tejada (in Spanish) (16): 81–98.
- Fuentes Codera, Maximiliano (2023-09-07). "Latinism and Hispanism in the Hispano-American Right in Interwar Spain and Argentina". Fascism. 12 (1): 55–80. doi:10.1163/22116257-bja10053. hdl:10256/23433. ISSN 2211-6249.
- Grinchpun, Boris Matías (2014). "Contra los "admiradores del despotismo": Alfonso de Laferrère frente a la Primera Guerra Mundial". PolHis (in Spanish). 7 (14): 117–137. ISSN 1853-7723.
- Laguado Duca, Arturo Claudio (2006). "Onganía y el nacionalismo militar en Argentina" (PDF). Universitas humanística (in Spanish) (65): 239–260.
- Orlando, Diego A. (2022). "Aristocracia espiritual, elitismo republicano y nacionalismo: Ernesto Palacio en La Nueva República, Número y Nuevo Orden". Observatorio Latinoamericano y Caribeño (in Spanish). 6 (2): 79–94. ISSN 1853-2713.
- Sverdloff, Mariano (2019-11-07). "Antimodernos periféricos: traducción, importación y tradición clásica en La Nueva República". Estudios de Teoría Literaria - Revista digital: Artes, letras y humanidades (in Spanish). 8 (17): 47–63. ISSN 2313-9676.
- Tato, María Inés (2005). "¿Alianzas estratégicas o confluencias ideológicas?: conservadores y nacionalistas en la Argentina de los años treinta". Cuadernos del Claeh (in Spanish). 28 (91): 119–135. ISSN 2393-5979.
