= Fascism in South America =

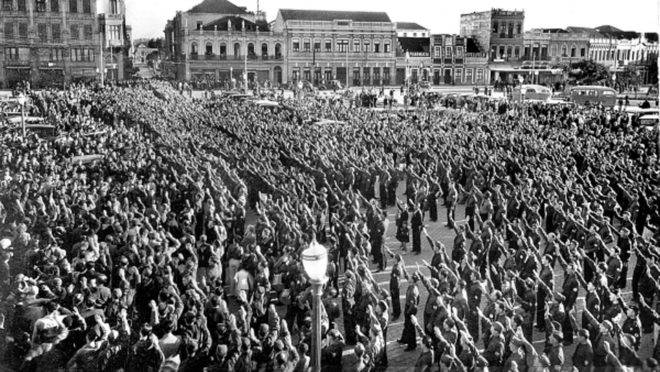
Integralists in the Brazilian city of Curitiba

Although the fascist ideology originated in and is primarily associated with Europe, fascism crossed the Atlantic Ocean during the interwar period and influenced South American politics. In particular, Italian fascism had a deep impact in the region.

== History of fascism ==
In 1934, at least six political parties in Latin America had their principles and/or ideologies inspired by Italy's National Fascist Party, including the Gold Shirts in Mexico, the namesake of which was based on the Italian Blackshirts. Several rulers, such as the first Argentine dictators of the Infamous Decade and Getúlio Vargas in the earlier part of the Vargas Era, were inspired by Benito Mussolini and his methods. The Italian fascist regime also took an active role in spreading fascist propaganda, and ideological influence, by working through Italian immigrant communities in South America. Additionally, fascist corporatism served as a model for economic policies in the region.

== Argentina ==
During the 1920s, Argentinian writer Leopoldo Lugones became a supporter of fascism, after which the country's coterie of pro-fascist intellectuals grew, including Juan Carulla, Ernesto Palacio, Manuel Gálvez, Carlos Ibarguren, Roberto de Laferrere, Mario Amadeo, and the brothers Rodolfo and Julio Irazusta. The fascists specifically gathered around the journal La Nueva Republica and expressed ideas reminiscent of those by French author Charles Maurras.

The fascist intellectuals grouped together under the name Afirmación de Una Nueva Argentina (ADUNA) as a loose alliance that struggled for support outside the intellectual elements of society. They did, however, work closely with the regime of José Félix Uriburu, which initially attempted to introduce corporatism inspired by Benito Mussolini, before giving way to the Infamous Decade.

Despite openly expressing their enthusiasm for fascism, ADUNA retained links to the established conservative political elements, with organized fascism being led by Thomist writer Nimio de Anquín whose Unión Nacional Fascista was active in various forms from the late 1920s until 1939. His fellow Thomist, Julio Meinvielle, also actively supported fascism and much of the anti-Semitism of Nazism as well. Meinvielle soon became the theological force behind the militant Tacuara Nationalist Movement.

Argentina came under the rule of Juan Perón in 1946, who is sometimes characterized as a fascist. However, the description of Peronism as a fascist ideology has proven controversial in academic circles.

=== Falkland Islands ===
Although the Falkland Islands have never had a fascist movement, the British overseas territory housed some British Union of Fascists members detained under Defence Regulation 18B during the Second World War. One detainee was Jeffrey Hamm, who was interned in the hull of a ship in Port Stanley harbor.

The status of the Falkland Islands was also an important issue for ADUNA, specifically the Irazusta brothers who wrote extensively on their desire to return the islands to Argentine sovereignty.

== Bolivia ==
The governments of David Toro and Germán Busch were vaguely committed to corporatism, ultra-nationalism, and national syndicalism, but they lacked coherence in their ideas. Such concepts were later adopted by the Revolutionary Nationalist Movement (MNR), which openly acknowledged its ideological debt to fascism and joined the military under Gualberto Villarroel's pro-Axis government in 1943. After the war, however, the MNR largely distanced itself from its fascist roots; by the time Víctor Paz Estenssoro came to power as the MNR leader in a 1952 coup, the movement's ideological investment in fascism had been abandoned.

From an initially oppositional stance, Óscar Únzaga's Bolivian Socialist Falange was an important group in the 1930s that sought to incorporate the ideas of José Antonio Primo de Rivera in Bolivia. However, like the MNR, it gradually de-emphasized its faith in fascism over time.

Flag of the Brazilian Integralist Party

== Brazil ==
Fascism first appeared in Brazil in 1922 with the foundation of the Legião do Cruzeiro do Sul. Within 10 years, several minor groups followed including the Legião de Outubro, the Partido Nacional Sindicalista, the Partido Fascista Nacional, the Legião Cearense do Trabalho, the Partido Nacionalista of São Paulo, the Partido Nacional Regenerador, and the Partido Socialista Brasileiro all of which espoused some form of fascism.

One of the most important fascist movements on the continent was Brazilian integralism which drew from both Italian fascism and Integralismo Lusitano. At its peak, the Ação Integralista Brasileira, led by Plínio Salgado, claimed as many as 200,000 members. Following coup attempts, it faced a crackdown from the Estado Novo of Getúlio Vargas in 1937. Like the Portuguese Estado Novo that influenced it, Vargas' regime borrowed elements from fascism without fully endorsing it, ultimately repressing those who advocated for full fascism.

Additionally, there were Italian and German fascist organizations acting through both communities between the 1920s and the end of the war, specifically in the Southeastern and Southern regions where most of their members operated. In the Italian fascist organizations, both immigrants and their descendants were accepted, such as in the case of the Fascio di Sao Paolo, one of the main organizations of Italian fascism in Brazil.

The Fascio di Sao Paolo was formed in March 1923 approximately 6 months after the fascists took power in Italy; it achieved huge success among the Italians of the city and rapidly spread to other cities and Italian communities. In November 1931, a branch of the Opera Nazionale Dopolavoro, which had existed in Italy since 1925, was founded in São Paulo and subsequently placed under the control of the Fascio di Sao Paulo. The Fascio was responsible for spreading the fascist doctrine among the popular classes. Another institution at the time was the Circolo Italiano di Sao Paolo which was established in 1910 and still active today. Its aim has been to preserve and disseminate Italian culture to Italian-Brazilians and Brazilians in general. In the mid-1920s, the fascist doctrine began to infiltrate the community and institution through the influence of Serafino Mazzolini, the Italian consul to Brazil.

Such Italian fascists organizations, along with several others and their members, were spied on, persecuted, and sometimes even closed by the Estado Novo regime. The regime alleged that they were "conspiring against the Brazilian State" under orders from the fascist government in Italy. Some members were arrested, and one of them, Cesar Rivelli, was expelled from the country.

After Brazil declared war against the Axis powers in 1942, the traditional Dante Alighieri school in São Paulo (which was frequented by students of Italian background at the time) had to change its name to the Colégio Visconde de São Leopoldo. The school reverted to its formal name after the war ended.

== Chile ==
Under the direction of Carlos Keller and Jorge González von Marées, the National Socialist Movement of Chile, following its formation in 1932, took up a position similar to that of Adolf Hitler, albeit with heavy criticism of his racial principles. They actively participated in parliamentary elections, but "the main impact was on the streets, where violence was one of its hallmarks." Many young Nacistas were "attracted less by the ideology of the party and more by its cult of violent confrontation with Socialists and Communists."

Eventually, the Nacistas dissociated themselves from the more extreme Hitlerist movements which grew up among the German immigrants in the South of Chile during the 1930s. By the parliamentary elections in 1937, 14,235 people voted for the National Socialist Movement of Chile.

Later adopting a more domestic version of fascism, the Nacistas attempted a coup in 1938 and faded after the attempt failed, adopting the name Vanguardia Popular Socialista before disbanding in 1941. Some ex-members formed the corporatist Movimiento Nacionalista de Chile in 1940, and members of this latter group went on to participate in the founding of the Fatherland and Liberty paramilitary group in 1970.

The regime of Augusto Pinochet that ruled from 1974 to 1990, which Fatherland and Liberty had helped to bring about, had some influences from falangismo, but it took a more conservative liberal direction during the 1980s. The government is sometimes characterized as fascist, although this has been the subject of much debate by academics.

== Colombia ==
Links were alleged between Nazi Germany and Laureano Gómez's newspaper El Siglo during the 1930s and 1940s, although Colombia has generally had little fascist activity in its history outside of the German community.

In the 1980s, the drug dealer Carlos Lehder founded his own neo-Nazi party, the National Latin Movement.

== Ecuador ==
Although the Alianza Revolucionaria Nacionalista Ecuatoriana (ARNE) was founded after the Second World War in 1948, it still looked to fascism for its inspiration. The group failed to make a major impact, however, as it was kept in check by the populism of José María Velasco Ibarra. With its efforts to frequently attend workers meetings and rallies in an effort to provoke violence with leftist groups, the ARNE proved little more than a wing of the Conservative Party, one of the country's two leading political groups.

== Paraguay ==
The Febrerista movement, active during the 1930s, demonstrated some support for fascism by seeking revolutionary change, endorsing strong nationalism, and seeking to partly introduce corporatism. Their revolutionary Rafael Franco-led government, however, proved decidedly non-radical during its brief tenure. The Febreristas have since regrouped as the Revolutionary Febrerista Party, a socialist party with no connection to fascism.

== Peru ==
In 1931, the Unión Revolucionaria was founded by Luis Miguel Sánchez Cerro as the state party of his dictatorship. After his assassination in 1933, the group came under the leadership of Raúl Ferrero Rebagliati who sought to mobilize mass support and even set up a Blackshirt movement in imitation of the Italian movement. A heavy defeat in the 1944 elections shook confidence in the movement, however, causing it to fade.

Following the collapse of Reblagiati's movement, the country's main outlet for fascism became the Peruvian Fascist Brotherhood formed by ex-Prime Minister José de la Riva-Agüero y Osma. The group initially enjoyed some prestige, but it receded into the background after Peru entered the Second World War in support of the Allies. Ultimately, the group's credibility was damaged by its leader becoming increasingly eccentric in his personal behavior.

The Alianza Popular Revolucionaria Americana (APRA) was originally a left-wing nationalist party founded in 1924. During the 1930s, it developed certain similarities with fascism, such as calling for a new national community and founding a small paramilitary wing, but it very quickly changed course and emerged as a mainstream social democratic party.

== Uruguay ==
The academic Hugo Fernández Artucio wrote the book Nazis in Uruguay in 1940 and campaigned against German fifth column activity in the country during the war. Such activity included a plot to take Uruguay as a German colony. Ultimately, twelve people were arrested for conspiracy, and the country placed a ban on the Nazi Party within its German community.

== Venezuela ==
Beyond some minor Falangist activity, Venezuela has had little fascist activity to speak of. However, among the country's German population, Arnold Margerie formed the Groupo Regional de Venezuela del Partido Nazi before the Second World War. The group was behind a number of cultural front groups active among Venezuela's Germans.

== See also ==
- Fascism in Asia
- Fascism in Europe
- Fascism in North America
- Fascism in the Americas
- Hindu terrorism
  - Hindutva
  - Hindu nationalism
