= Mario Amadeo =

Argentine politician, diplomat and writer

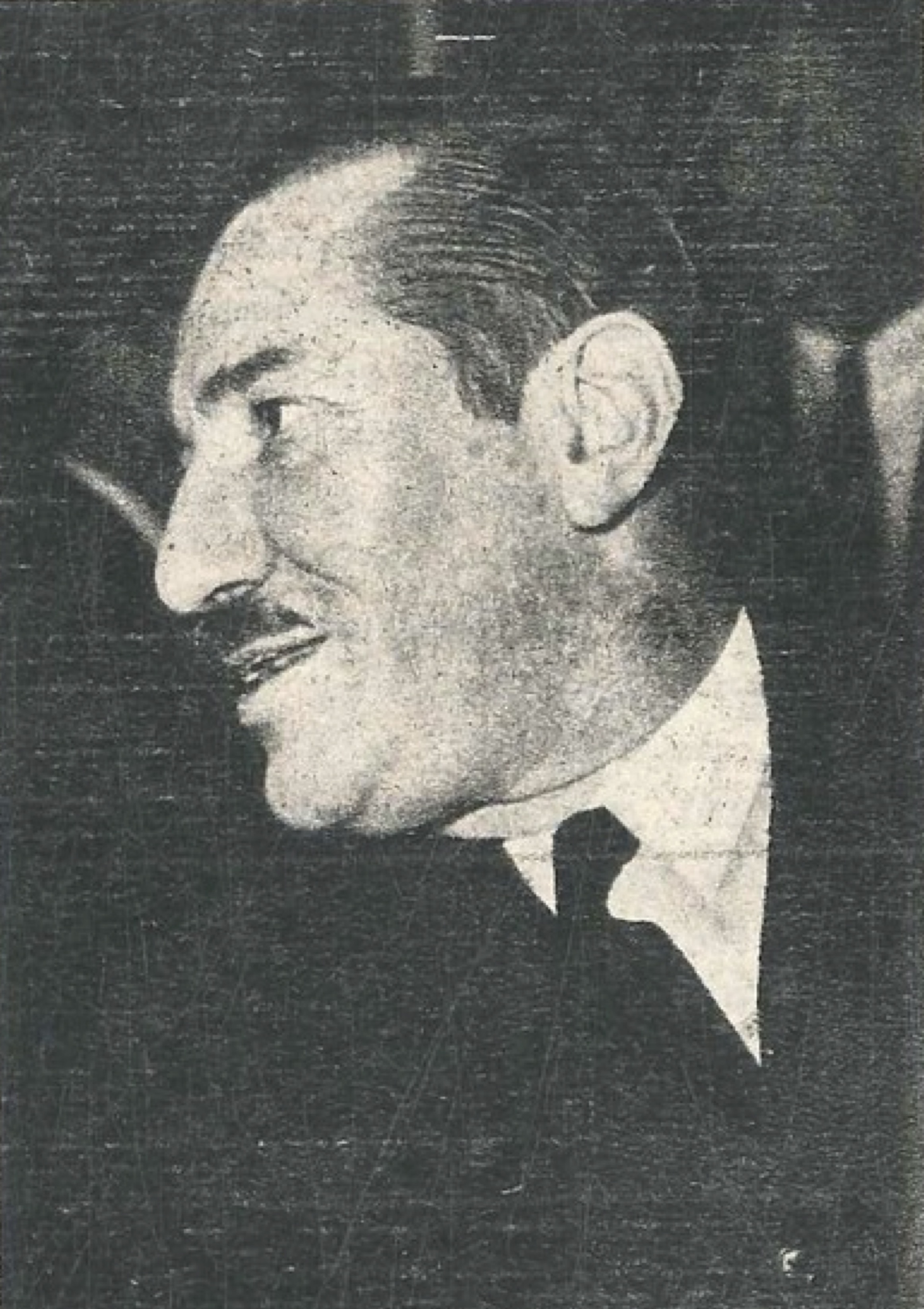
- Mario Amadeo c. 1963.

Ambassador of Argentina to Brazil
- In office 1966–1969
- Appointed by: Juan Carlos Onganía
- Preceded by: Carlos Alberto Fernández
- Succeeded by: Osiris Villegas

Permanent Representative of Argentina to the United Nations
- In office 1958–1962
- Appointed by: Arturo Frondizi
- Preceded by: Mariano José Drago
- Succeeded by: Lucio García del Solar

Minister of Foreign Affairs and Worship
- In office 23 September 1955 – 13 November 1955
- President: Eduardo Lonardi
- Preceded by: Ildefonso Cavagna Martínez
- Succeeded by: Luis Podestá Costa

Personal details
- Born: Mario Octavio Amadeo French; 11 January 1911 Buenos Aires, Argentina
- Died: 19 March 1983 (aged 72) Buenos Aires, Argentina
- Occupation: Politician, diplomat, writer

Mario Octavio Amadeo French (11 January 1911 – 19 March 1983) was an Argentine conservative nationalist politician, diplomat and writer who served as a minister in the government of Eduardo Lonardi. He belonged to the highly influential right-wing tendency prominent in Argentine politics on either side of the Second World War.

== Biography ==
=== Rise to prominence ===
A native of Buenos Aires, Amadeo studied philosophy and briefly worked as an academic in that area. During the 1930s the youthful Amadeo was closely associated with the anti-liberalism tendency and took his inspiration from such Catholic conservative writers as Léon Bloy, Charles Péguy, Jacques Maritain, G. K. Chesterton, Hilaire Belloc, Giovanni Papini and Ramiro de Maeztu. As such he belonged to the group of rightist authors and activists that included Carlos Ibarguren, Manuel Gálvez, Juan Carulla, Ernesto Palacio, Máximo Etchecopar and Rodolfo and Julio Irazusta. He was also the President of Ateneo de la República, an elitist semi-secret club active in the 1940s and accused of fascism by its opponents, which included a number of cabinet ministers amongst its members. A founder of the Argentine Catholic Action in 1931, as well as the later rightist journal El Baluarte, Amadeo was influenced in his political ideas by Ramiro de Maeztu and Hispanidad and advocated an anti-democratic traditionalism that also looked to corporatism and an economic nationalism that sought to curtail the influence of foreign capital in Argentine life. He was an enthusiastic supporter of the regime of Francisco Franco in Spain.

During the Second World War Amadeo became associated with a strand within Argentine politics that came out in favour of the Axis powers. As a consequence the United States Department of State's so-called 'Blue Book on Argentina' listed Amadeo as being 'a trusted collaborator' of the SD'. Amadeo was close to Juan Carlos Goyeneche, a frequent visitor to Nazi Germany during World War II, and it was Amadeo who ensured communication between Goyeneche and Foreign Minister Enrique Ruiz Guiñazú. In his later career as an ambassador to the United Nations he would demonstrate further Nazi sympathies when he attacked Israel for kidnapping Adolf Eichmann.

=== Peronism ===
Within General Lonardi's cabinet, he was part of a Catholic nationalist strain that recalled the earlier ideas of the likes Carulla and the Irazustas and also included Labour Minister Luis Cerruti Costa and the President's brother in law Clemente Villada Achaval. Amadeo sought to place himself within the conservative traditions of Juan Manuel de Rosas and argued that the Peronism he came to serve was also part of the same tradition.

Amadeo initially remained loyal to Perón, and indeed saved his life when, following the latter's overthrow on September 19, 1955, the deposed leader slipped on the launch that was taking him to Paraguay and would have drowned had Amadeo not rescued him. Despite this Amadeo would later come to criticise Perón for using the workers as a basis for his regime, rather than following the old nationalist blueprint of hierarchy which he and his contemporaries endorsed. In response, author Ernesto Sabato published an open letter to Amadeo, The Other Face of Peronism, in which, without denying his own opposition to the populist leader, Sabato appealed for less hostility towards Perón's largely working class supporters.

Following the coup against Perón, on September 25, Amadeo was appointed Foreign Minister for President Eduardo Lonardi; his spell in the post ended, however, when General Lonardi was replaced by General Pedro Aramburu on November 13.

For the 1957 and 1958 elections Amadeo led his own party, the Unión Federal Democrática Crisitiana although the group failed to attract any support. He was also a founder member of the Argentine autonomous sister organization of the Tradición, Familia y Propiedad movement initially founded in Brazil in 1960.

=== United Nations ===
Following his failure to win support as a political leader in his own right Amadeo pursued a long career with the United Nations, serving in a number of capacities such as being the Permanent Representative of Argentina and the inaugural vice-chairman of the United Nations Committee on the Peaceful Uses of Outer Space. In May 1959 he also served as President of the Security Council. For a long time he served as the head of Argentina's delegation to the institution but he frequently proved a controversial choice.

Amadeo was involved in the disappearances during the Dirty War and was personally responsible for law 22068 which allowed the government to declare anyone disappeared for 90 days as legally dead. At the same time however Amadeo was also a member of the Sub-Commission on Prevention of Discrimination and Protection of Minorities attached to the United Nations Commission on Human Rights which was investigating the disappearances. As a member of this group in 1979 he accepted that Argentine prisons were poor but argued that political disappearances had already ended and even argued that similar disappearances were a regular feature of life in New York City.

== Awards and honours ==
=== Foreign honours ===
- Spain:
  - Grand Cross of the Order of Isabella the Catholic (1960)
