= Falangism in Latin America =

Spanish fascist ideological presence in Latin Amerca

Falangism in Latin America has been a feature of political life since the 1930s as movements looked to the national syndicalist clerical fascism of the Spanish state and sought to apply it to other Spanish-speaking countries. From the mid-1930s, the Falange Exterior, effectively an overseas version of the Spanish Falange, was active throughout Latin America in order to drum up support among Hispanic communities. However, the ideas would soon permeate into indigenous political groups. The term "Falangism" should not be applied to the military dictatorships of such figures as Alfredo Stroessner, Augusto Pinochet and Rafael Trujillo because while these individuals often enjoyed close relations to Francisco Franco's Spain, their military nature and frequent lack of commitment to national syndicalism and the corporate state mean that they should not be classed as Falangist (although individuals within each regime may have been predisposed towards the ideology). The phenomenon can be seen in a number of movements both past and present.

The popularity of Falangism in Latin America declined after the defeat of Fascism and the Axis powers in World War II.

== Argentina ==
Juan Perón built his power base on his alliance with trade unions in Argentina, many of whom supported syndicalism whilst his government would go on to maintain links with Franco. However, Falangism in the country was largely ill at ease with Peronism until the emergence of the Tacuara Nationalist Movement in the 1960s. This violent movement looked to José Antonio Primo de Rivera for its inspiration and was also inspired by the works of Julio Meinvielle, himself a strong admirer of Falangism.

Elsewhere, both Manuel Gálvez and Juan Carulla endorsed "hispanidad" and in doing so expressed strong admiration for Falangism, especially Carulla.

== Bolivia ==
Formed in 1937, the Bolivian Socialist Falange (Falange Socialista Boliviana or FSB) of Óscar Únzaga gained a strong following amongst former landowners by offering a platform strongly influenced by Franco and Benito Mussolini. The FSB became effective opposition to the Revolutionary Nationalist Movement government although their fortunes would later decline and they were ultimately absorbed into the Nationalist Democratic Action.

A breakaway group known as the Movimiento al Socialismo – Unzaguista emerged in 1987 under David Añez Pedraza. Representing a more left-wing take on Bolivian Falangism, it became moribund before the title, rather than ideology, was effectively appropriated by Evo Morales in 1999 to form the basis of his leftist Movement for Socialism.

A revivalist group, Frente Socialista de Naciones Bolivianas, was formed by Horacio Poppe in 2000 and they have since emerged as the Falange Neounzaguista, otherwise known as the "Whiteshirts". Taking their name from Óscar Únzaga, they have led a recruitment drive in Bolivian universities, although they remain a minor force.

== Chile ==
In 1935, a group of younger social Christians split from the Conservative Party to form the Falange Nacional. Despite its name, this group was largely made up of progressive and reformist Catholics and bore little resemblance to Spanish Falangism. In its early years, it imitated elements of fascist movements with some of its members wearing uniforms and undergoing paramilitary training. With its progressive economic program (creating an alternative to capitalism, "redeeming" the proletariat), it was in open conflict with the Catholic high clergy who accused it of disrespecting the Church's leadership and siding with communists. Despite its aim to be a centrist alternative to the left and the right and relatively great public attention, it never received more than 4 percent of the votes. Later, it supported the leftist administration of Juan Antonio Ríos (1942–1946) and in 1957 was one of the founding groups of the Christian Democrat Party of Chile. One of its former members, Eduardo Frei Montalva, became President of Chile in 1964. Other notable members include Radomiro Tomic and Bernardo Leighton.

A more avowedly Falangist group, Movimiento Revolucionario Nacional Sindicalista (Revolutionary National Syndicalist Movement, MRNS), would appear in 1952, although it did not achieve the influence of the Falange Nacional. The group became more prominent during the 1970s in the development of Chilean nationalist thought through the publication of Forja. The movement supported the military dictatorship of Augusto Pinochet and was part of the National Secretariat of Trade Unions, an organization created by the regime of Augusto Pinochet and whose leadership was assumed by the MRNS and members of the recently self-dissolved Fatherland and Liberty Party. The movement eventually dissolved sometime in the 1980s.

The name has proven durable however as it still organised into the 21st century, albeit on a very minor level. They also organise a youth movement, Guardia Revolucionaria Nacionalsindicalista.

== Colombia ==
During the 1930s, future President of Colombia Laureano Gómez became an enthusiastic supporter of Falangism, although this fervour had died down somewhat by the time he took power in 1950. Nevertheless, a Falangist group was active in the country during the 1940s.

A current group exists, the Falange Nacional Patriótica de Colombia, which claims to be active in the National University of Colombia. Recently, they changed their name to Frente Obrero Social Patriota.

== Costa Rica ==
President of Costa Rica Teodoro Picado Michalski, who governed between 1944 and 1948, was an admirer of Falangism and Somocismo, and even defended Francisco Franco in the United Nations. However, even after the end of the Second World War, the National Delegation of the Falangist Foreign Service recounted Costa Rica as one of the Hispanic countries where there was still an active circle of Falangists. Likewise, Falangist literature was published in Costa Rica between 1937 and 1946 in newspapers like El Nacionalista and La gloria de España, while two hours a week of propaganda were broadcast in Costa Rica on the radio programs La España y el Mundo.

== Cuba ==
A minor Cuban Falangist movement existed from 1936 to 1940 under Antonio Avendaño and Alfonso Serrano Vilariño. This group was effectively ended by a law which barred political groups from making specific reference to the policies of foreign groups.

Although the government of Fulgencio Batista maintained good relations with Franco, it was not Falangist and the only real manifestation of Falangism since 1940 was with the minuscule (and probably defunct) La Falange Cubana.

== Ecuador ==
A group known as the Alianza Revolucionaria Nacionalista Ecuatoriana appeared in 1948, drawing its influences directly from Falangism and synarchism. Under Jorge Luna, they recruited followers from the young upper middle classes and adopted a platform of Christianity, nationalism and anti-communism. However, the group ultimately became more of a street fighting army in support of President José María Velasco Ibarra rather than a political party.

A fringe tendency towards Falangism continues in the Falange Nacional Garciana Ecuatoriana, said to be a newly formed group.

== El Salvador ==
Under the regime of Arturo Armando Molina, left-wing anti-government guerrilla activity became such a feature of Salvadoran life that government agencies began to fund far-right paramilitaries and death squads to oppose the leftists. One of the first of these was the Fuerzas Armadas de Liberacion Nacional – Guerra de Exterminacion, better known by the acronym FALANGE, set up in 1975 with the stated aim of exterminating "all communists and their collaborators". Carrying out 38 murders in one week in October 1975 alone, the group changed its name to the Union Guerrera Blanca in 1976, de-emphasising its Falangist ideology whilst continuing its initial role of assassination of left-wing targets.

== Mexico ==
Mexican synarchism, which combined Catholicism with anti-communism, bore some of the hallmarks of Falangism and looked to Franco (amongst others) for inspiration. Its political representatives, the National Synarchist Union, became influential during the late 1930s.

Alongside this indigenous variation a wholly mimetic group, the Falange Española Tradicionalista was formed in the country by Spanish merchants based there who opposed the consistent support given to the Republican side in the Spanish Civil War by Lázaro Cárdenas. The group neither sought nor had influence outside this immigrant population, however.

Mexican far-right groups often emphasise Orgullo Criollo ("Creole Pride"), which underlines the celebration of their links to Spain and the hispanidad culture.

== Nicaragua ==
Falangist influence was felt in the country during the later 1930s, particularly in the Colegio Centro América in Managua where the ideology was widespread. However, such activity was suppressed after 1941 as Nicaragua took a decidedly pro-United States line after the attack on Pearl Harbor.

== Peru ==
Between 1967 and 1968, the Falangist organization known as the Escalones Juveniles Nacionalistas was founded in Lima, Peru, at the San Isidro school. Among its founders was Luis Fernando Figari, then a secondary school teacher at the San Isidro and Santa Maria schools. The organization took inspiration from Primo de Rivera’s doctrine, and the Falangist anthem "Cara al Sol" was routinely sung among its ranks. The EJN remained active until 1971, after Figari, alongside Sergio Tapia and other students from San Isidro school founded the Sodalitium Christianae Vitae (SCV).

A minor Falange Perú exists and claims the support of Spanish Falangists.

== Puerto Rico ==
Around the time of the Spanish Civil War, the Falange was heavily active amongst the 8,000 or so Spanish citizens on the island, with an official branch of the Falange organised in San Juan. This group officially disavowed any involvement in local politics, although it was scrutinised closely by the FBI during the Second World War.

Two very minor Falangist groups have been active in the drive for Puerto Rican independence. The first of these was the Falange Boricua, who have claimed that they were banned on 7 May 2000 after leader Walter Lozano was arrested attempting to blockade U.S. military bases on the island. They have since been refounded as the Movimento Nacional Sindicalista de Puerto Rico.

Primarily in online spaces like TikTok, X, and Telegram, there has been a resurgence in Puerto Rican Falangism. Most followers tend to see the United States "occupation" as an attempt to spread Masonry, Protestantism and de-Hispanicize the island. Nearly all of the followers of Falangism on the island seek reunification with Spain and believe the Black Legend has historically targeted the island.

== Venezuela ==
Enrique Parra Bozo, who was noted for his admiration of Franco as well as his Catholicism and anti-communism, led the Partido Auténtico Nacionalista along Falangist lines. The group lent its support to the military regime of Marcos Pérez Jiménez and even attempted, though unsuccessfully, to nominate him as their candidate for the 1963 presidential election.

A minor group, the Falange Venezolana, has been active in the 21st century and look to José Antonio Primo de Rivera, Ramiro Ledesma Ramos, Léon Degrelle, Ferenc Szálasi and Corneliu Zelea Codreanu for its inspiration.

== See also ==
- Fascism in South America
- Latin America during World War II
- Philippine Falange – Falangism in another former Spanish colony
