= Guiñazú =

Guiñazú is a surname. Notable people with the surname include:

- Enrique Ruiz Guiñazú (1884–1967), Argentine politician
- Eusebio Guiñazú (born 1982), Argentine rugby union player
- Luciano Guiñazú (born 1971), Argentine footballer
- Magdalena Ruiz Guiñazú (1931–2022), Argentine journalist
- Oseas Guiñazú, Argentine politician
- Pablo Guiñazú (born 1978), Argentine footballer
