= Roberto de Laferrère =

Argentinean writer and political activist

Roberto de Laferrère (10 January 1900, Buenos Aires - 31 January 1963, Buenos Aires) was an Argentinean writer and political activist. He was one of the leading figures in the nationalist movement active amongst a group of leading intellectuals in the 1930s.

== Nationalism ==
De Laferrère came from one of Argentina's leading patrician families. He was of partial French descent although on his mother's side his ancestors included Encarnación Ezcurra, the wife of Juan Manuel de Rosas.

He was a strong critic of democracy, denouncing the trust it placed in ignorant masses. He was one of the main developers of the belief within Argentine nationalist thought that liberalism was merely a prelude to communism, arguing that "democracy hands us over unarmed to these forces of extreme socialism and anarchy". He wrote widely for La Fronda, a conservative nationalist journal. Like many of the nationalist leaders de Laferrère was an academic and in 1938 he joined the likes of the Irazusta brothers, Carlos Ibarguren, Manuel Gálvez and Ernesto Palacio in establishing the Instituto Juan Manuel de Rosas. The Instituto soon became a centre for the publication of highly conservative scholarship in which historical revisionism about Argentina's past loomed large.

== Liga Republicana ==
Along with Rodolfo Irazusta he established the Liga Republicana youth movement around 1927, the aim of which was to undermine the government. The group was united by the members hatred of Hipólito Yrigoyen although significant elements within the Liga were inspired by the fascism of Benito Mussolini as well as the ideas of Miguel Primo de Rivera, 2nd Marquis of Estella. De Laferrère was insistent that the Liga should not become a political party and he clashed with Irazusta over the issue when the latter suggested presenting a list for the 1930 election. De Laferrère and Juan Carulla's idea, that the Liga should support the Independent Socialists, was endorsed and Irazusta resigned from the movement.

Following the establishment of the Argentine Civic Legion in 1931 Laferrère began to wane in his support for José Félix Uriburu and eventually withdrew his Liga Republicana from the movement, citing the "lumpen" nature of what was approaching a mass movement, as well as it ties to mainstream conservatism. As a consequence of de Laferrère's split other nationalist intellectuals followed suit.

== Later years ==
Like many of his nationalist colleagues de Laferrère had a strong strain of anti-Americanism in his thought and this increased during the Second World War. He argued in 1941 that Argentina should adopt a neutral position and should instead concentrate on strengthening its own army in order to ensure it could defend itself rather than spending on supporting the American war effort. His views influenced Enrique Ruiz Guiñazú, who had been appointed as Foreign Minister. However, despite his own anti-Semitism, de Laferrère was not a supporter of Nazism and rather endorsed an isolationist policy for Argentina. Suspicious of all overseas powers, with the exception of France which he declared his support for in 1939, he argued in early 1941 that "today our worst enemies are the British and Jews. Tomorrow they could be the Yanks or the Germans".

His anti-British sentiment was a common feature of nationalist rhetoric in Argentina, deriving in part from the issue's surrounding the Falkland or Malvinas Islands sovereignty dispute as well what the nationalists portrayed as a history of mistreatment at the hands of Britain through a series of loans with very high interest rates after independence, British involvement in the independence of Uruguay and the settling of her borders at the expense of Argentina and a form of commercial imperialism that de Laferrère felt had caused the Argentine Civil Wars.

Unlike some of his fellow nationalists de Laferrère was not an enthusiastic supporter of Juan Perón and he scoffed at what he saw as Perón's cowardice when he was ousted from the Presidency in 1955.
