= David Vega =

David Vega may refer to:

- David Vega (footballer) (born 1980), Argentine football midfielder playing for Olimpo de Bahía Blanca
- David Vega (gymnast) (born 1998), Spanish trampolinist
- David Vega (1953–2007), guitarist with 1970s funk band Graham Central Station
