= Delfina Bunge =

Argentine writer, poet, essayist and philanthropist

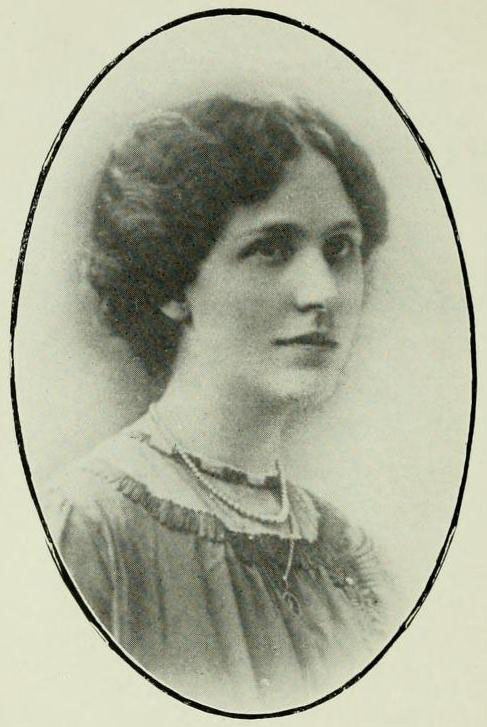
- Delfina Bunge (1920)
- Born: December 24, 1881; Buenos Aires, Argentina
- Died: March 30, 1952 (aged 70); Alta Gracia, Argentina
- Education: Colegio del Sagrado Corazón
- Occupations: Poet, essayist
- Spouse: Manuel Gálvez (m. 1910)
- Children: 3
- Relatives: Amancio Williams (son-in-law)
- Writing career
- Language: Spanish, French
- Period: 1911–1956

Delfina Bunge de Gálvez (December 24, 1881 – March 30, 1952) was an Argentine writer, poet, essayist and philanthropist.

== Biography ==
Born in Buenos Aires, she was the daughter of Raimundo Octavio Bunge, quondam justice of the Supreme Court of Argentina, and María Luisa Justa Rufina de Arteaga. She had at least three brothers: Carlos Octavio Bunge, publicist, sociologist and historian, as well as Augusto Bunge and Alejandro Bunge, who were involved in the country's affairs; she also had a sister, Julia Bunge de Uranga. She was educated in the Colegio del Sagrado Corazón.

Bunge married Manuel Gálvez. Some of her first verses which were published in magazines and newspapers, were in the French language. Her first volume of poems, Simplement, appeared in Paris in 1911. In 1933, in collaboration with her sister, Julia, Bunge published El arca de Noé; in 1918, she issued a second book of verse in French, La nouvelle moisson, in Buenos Aires; and later, she published Historia y novena de Nuestra Senora de Lourdes.

During World War II, Bunge published anti-semitic works that promoted conspiracies that Jews sought to undermine Christian society.

Her daughter and namesake, Delfina Gálvez Bunge, married the influential Argentine architect Amancio Williams.

She died in Alta Gracia in 1952, and appeared on an Argentine stamp in 1983.

== Selected works ==
- Simplement (poesía en francés), París, Alphonse Lemerre, 1911.
- El Arca de Noé: libro de lectura. Segundo grado, Buenos Aires, Cabaut, 1916.
- Cuentos de Navidad, ( Cuento: El oro el incienso y la mirra de D.B.) junto a otros cuentistas, Buenos Aires, sin edición, 1917.
- La Nouvelle moisson, (poesía en francés) Buenos Aires : Cooperativa Editorial Limitada, 1918.
- Poesías, Buenos Aires : Ediciones Selectas América, 1920.
- Tierras del mar azul, viajes, Buenos Aires, América Unida, 1920.
- El Alma de los niños, religión, Buenos Aires : Agencia General de Librería y Publicaciones, 1921.
- Las Imágenes del infinito, ensayo, Buenos Aires : Agencia General de Librería y Publicaciones, 1922. (Premio Municipal)
- El Tesoro del mundo, Buenos Aires : Mercatali, impr., 1923.
- Oro, incienso y mirra, religión, Buenos Aires, Mercatali, (Maubé?), 1924.
- Los Malos tiempos de hoy, Buenos Aires, Buenos Aires, 1926.
- Escuela: lecturas escolares para tercer grado, escrito junto a Julia Bunge, Buenos Aires, Cabaut, 1933.
- Hogar, junto a Julia Bunge, Buenos Aires, Cabaut, 1933.
- Lectura para cuarto grado escolar. Buenos Aires: Cabaut, 1933
- Hogar y patria:, libro de lectura para 5º grado, Es el "Libro quinto" de la serie: *"Lecturas graduadas". - Incluye una "Carta Epílogo" del Dr. Ernesto Padilla, Buenos Aires, H.M.E., 1933.
- El Reino de Dios, Buenos Aires : Santa Catalina, 1934.
- Oro, incienso y mirra, cuentos, 2da Edición, Buenos Aires, Cabaut y Cía., 1935.
- La Belleza en la vida cotidiana, ensayos, Santiago de Chile, Ercilla, 1936.
- Lecturas, cuarto grado escolar, Buenos Aires, Cabaut, 1936.
- Iniciación literaria, Buenos Aires, H.M.E., 1937.
- Nociones de religión católica: catecismo único: mi primer libro de religión, [s.l.] : [s.n.], 1938.
- Viaje alrededor de mi infancia. ensayo Buenos Aires. Imp. López. 1938.
- Dios y yo, folleto 64p., Buenos Aires, El Libro, 1940.
- Catolicismo de Guerra, (Folleto, 16p.), Buenos Aires, 1942.
- Las Mujeres y la vocación, Buenos Aires, Poblet, 1943.
- La Vida en los sueños, Buenos Aires, Emecé, 1943, 1951.
- En Torno a León Bloy : Algunos aspectos de la vida y la muerte de León Bloy, Biografías, Buenos Aires : Club de Lectores, 1944.
- Cura de estrellas, (máximas), Buenos Aires : Emecé, 1949.
- Viaje a rededor de mi infancia, Buenos Aires, Peuser, 1956. Cuatro ediciones.
- Poesías, prol. José Enrique Rodó y Alfonsina Storni, trad., (s.l.) : (s.n.), (1920).
- Seis villancicos de Navidad y Reyes, (s.l.) : (s.n.), (19--).
