= David Vega (footballer) =

Argentine footballer

Davíd Vega
Personal information
- Full name: Davíd Alejandro Vega
- Date of birth: 17 November 1980 (age 45)
- Place of birth: Guiñazu, Argentina
- Height: 1.77 m (5 ft 10 in)
- Position: Midfielder

Senior career*
Years	Team	Apps	(Gls)
1997–1998	General Paz Juniors	0	(0)
1998–2004	Talleres	23	(0)
2004–2005	Alumni	22	(4)
2005–2009	Defensa y Justicia	38	(3)
2009–2020	Olimpo	173	(11)
2020–2021	La Armonia		
- * Club domestic league appearances and goals as of 18:14, 7 August 2022 (UTC)

Davíd Alejandro Vega (born 17 November 1980) is an Argentine football midfielder.

== Career ==
Vega began his playing career in the regionalised third division of Argentine football with General Paz Juniors in 1997. He then joined Talleres de Córdoba in 1998 where he played in the Argentine Primera División and in the Copa Mercosur. He was not a regular player for the side making only 23 league appearances for the club in six years.

Following Talleres' relegation at the end of the 2003–04 season he joined minnows Alumni de Villa María in the regionalised 4th division for a season.

In 2005 Vega returned to professional football joining Buenos Aires based side Defensa y Justicia where he became an icon of the club where he played until 2009.

In 2009, he joined Olimpo de Bahía Blanca and became a key player in the side that won the Primera B Nacional and promotion to the Primera División. Vega survived the inevitable team rebuilding for the Primera División and made his return to the Argentine top flight after a six-year absence in a 2–1 away defeat to Banfield on 8 August 2010. On 12 February 2010 he scored a famous goal against Banfield in Olimpo's first fixture of the Clausura tournament, hitting a long range volley to equalise the game before Carlos Salom hit an agonising last minute winner for the home team.

== Titles ==
Olimpo Primera B Nacional (1): 2009-10
