= Nosotros (magazine) =

Cultural magazine in Argentina (1907–1943)

- Categories: Cultural magazine
- Founder: Roberto Giusti; Alfredo Bianchi
- Founded: 1907
- Final issue: 1943
- Country: Argentina
- Based in: Buenos Aires
- Language: Spanish
- OCLC: 1639227

Nosotros was a cultural magazine published in Buenos Aires, Argentina. It was in circulation between 1907 and 1943. The magazine was a very significant publication in the country and enjoyed high levels of popularity and circulation not only in Argentina but also in other Latin American countries.

== History and profile ==
Nosotros was established by Roberto Giusti and Alfredo Bianchi in 1907. The headquarters was in Buenos Aires. The magazine adhered to the view of ideological evolution.

Nosotros folded in 1943.

=== Contributors ===
Jorge Luis Borges was among the contributors. His writings from 1921 declared his distance from futurism and the Spanish Ultraismo. Alejandro Korn was another significant contributor, although his contributions were not regular. Manuel Gálvez was the art critic of the magazine. José Bianco started his career through essays published in Nosotros. Alvaro Melian Lafinur published critics in the magazine.

Various Spanish writers published articles in Nosotros during its run.
