= French intervention in Mexico =

French intervention in Mexico or Franco-Mexican war may refer to:

- Pastry War (1838–1839), the first French intervention in Mexico
- Second French intervention in Mexico (1861–1867)
