= Republican League =

Fascist movement in Argentina

Republican League Liga Republicana
- leaders: Roberto Laferrère and Rodolfo Irazusta
- Founded: 1929
- Dissolved: 1931
- Succeeded by: Argentine Civic Legion
- Ideology: Nacionalismo; Argentine nationalism Anti-Yrigoyenismo; Fascism
- Political position: Far-right

The Republican League (Liga Republicana) was a fascist movement in Argentina founded by Roberto Laferrere and Rodolfo Irazusta in 1929. The party borrowed heavily from the ideology and structure of the French integrist movement Action Française whose ideas had been disseminated in Argentina by polemicists such as Juan Carulla.

== History ==
The Liga had its roots in a youth movement set up by Irazusta and Laferrere around 1927, the aim of which was to undermine the government. The group was united by the members′ hatred of Hipólito Yrigoyen although significant elements within the Liga were inspired by the fascism of Benito Mussolini as well as the ideas of Miguel Primo de Rivera, 2nd Marquis of Estella. Laferrère was insistent that the Liga should not become a political party and he clashed with Irazusta over the issue when the latter suggested presenting a list for the 1930 election. De Laferrère and Juan Carulla's idea, that the Liga should support the Independent Socialists, was endorsed and Irazusta resigned from the movement.

Following the establishment of the Argentine Civic Legion in 1931, Laferrère began to wane in his support for José Félix Uriburu and eventually withdrew his Liga Republicana from the movement, citing the "lumpen" nature of what was approaching a mass movement, as well as its ties to mainstream conservatism. As a consequence of de Laferrère's split other nationalist intellectuals followed suit. The fate of the Liga after this is unclear.
