= Magdalena Ruiz Guiñazú =

Argentine writer and journalist (1931–2022)

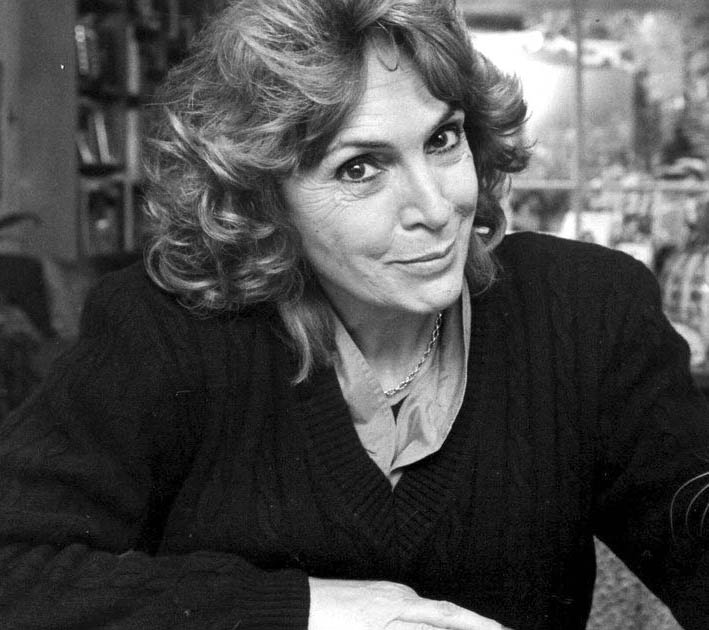
- Ruiz Guiñazú pictured at her house in Buenos Aires
- Born: María Magdalena Teresa Ruiz Guiñazú; 15 February 1931; Buenos Aires, Argentina
- Died: 6 September 2022 (aged 91); Buenos Aires, Argentina
- Occupations: Journalist, writer
- Children: 5
- Parent(s): Enrique Ruiz Guiñazú; María Celina Cantilo Ortiz

María Magdalena Teresa Ruiz Guiñazú (15 February 1931 – 6 September 2022) was an Argentine writer and journalist. She worked in the National Commission on the Disappearance of Persons. She received many Martín Fierro Awards including the Golden Martín Fierro award in 1993.

Her father was Enrique Ruiz Guiñazú, an Argentine politician who is best remembered for his spell as Minister of Foreign Affairs, International Trade and Worship in the 1940s.

== Human rights ==
In the years 1976, 1977 and 1978, she worked in Channel 11, controlled by the army. She was one of 16 women journalists who received an award from the Minister of Home Affairs, General Albano Harguindeguy, in August 1980.

During the 1980s, she took an attitude of defence of human rights from different organisations. From her radio show, she was the first to give voice to the Mothers of the Plaza de Mayo during the dictatorship government. Throughout her career she has shown to be against violence of any sign, with a pluralistic conception of journalism which fit all voices and all positions.

During the democracy, president Raúl Alfonsín elected her to become an active member of the National Commission on the Disappearance of Persons or CONADEP. Ruiz Guiñazú's work in the Commission investigation was highlighted.

== Awards and honours ==
- 1974, Premio Santa Clara de Asís.
- 1977, Premio Santa Clara de Asís.
- 1977, Premio San Gabriel.
- 1980, Order of Merit of Poland for her coverage of the first visit of Pope John Paul II to Poland.
- 1983, «Women of the year» elected by popular vote.
- 1984, Order of Merit of France for her defence of human rights.
- 1984, Order of Merit of Italy for her defence of human rights and press freedom.
- 1987, Premios Konex: Certificate of Merit.
- 1987, Premio Martín Fierro.
- 1988, Premio Martín Fierro.
- 1989, Premio Martín Fierro.
- 1990, Premio Martín Fierro.
- 1991, Premio Martín Fierro.
- 1991, Premio Konex de Platino a la mejor Conductora.
- 1992, Broadcasting Award.
- 1992, Prensario Award.
- 1992, Premio Martín Fierro.
- 1993, Prensario Award.
- 1993, Premio Martín Fierro.
- 1993, Gold Martín Fierro Award.
- 1994, Broadcasting Award.
- 1994, Legion of Honor, France, awarded the rank of officer for her defence of human rights and press freedom.
- 1996, Platinum Broadcasting Award for journalism.
- 1997, Award for best news program Broadcasting.
- 1997, Honorary Distinction from Harvard University and the David Rockefeller Center for Latin American Studies.
- 1997, Premios Konex: Certificate of Merit.
- 2002, Premio Martín Fierro for best journalistic work.
- 2003, Premio Martín Fierro.
- 2003, Grand Prize for Life Path, "'International Women's Media Foundation's Lifetime Achievement Award".
- 2007, Premios Konex Platinum and Diamond.
- 2007, Radiofónica Activity Award ETHER for Best Female Broadcaster
- 2008, Premio Martín Fierro Best daily newspaper work in Magdalene Drive unearthly female radial Radio Continental.
- 2008, Premio Martín Fierro.
- 2013, Premio Martín Fierro for female Journalistic Work.
- 2013, Grand Prize for Press Freedom for her Journalistic Excellence 2013.
