= Julio Irazusta =

Argentine writer and politician

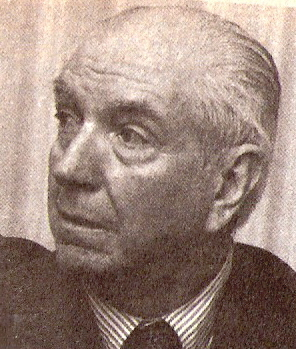
- Born: Julio Alberto Gustavo Irazusta; 23 July 1899; Gualeguaychú, Argentina
- Died: 5 May 1982 (aged 82); Gualeguaychú, Argentina
- Education: Balliol College; University of Buenos Aires
- Occupations: writer and politician
- Writing career
- Notable work: Argentina y el imperialismo británico: Los eslabones de una cadena 1806-1833

Julio Alberto Gustavo Irazusta (23 July 1899 – 5 May 1982) was an Argentine writer and politician who was one of the leading lights of the nacionalista movement of the 1920s and 1930s. He collaborated closely with his older brother Rodolfo Irazusta throughout his career.

== Early years ==
Irazusta was born close to the Rincon del Cura area of Gualeguaychú, Entre Ríos into a family noted for its support of radical politics. He attended the University of Buenos Aires – graduating in 1922 with a law degree – and around this time he was noted as a supporter of the Radical Civic Union. As a student he edited the literary journal Revista Nacional from 1981 to 1920, collaborating with Ernesto Palacio, who at the time held leftist views. Both men came under the influence of the Spanish rightist Ramiro de Maeztu although Irazusta balanced this by also following the writings of Italian liberal Benedetto Croce.

== Move to the right ==
From 1923 to 1927 Irazusta travelled extensively in western Europe. During his time in the United Kingdom he studied Latin and philosophy at Balliol College, Oxford. He also spent time in France where his move towards right-wing politics grew rapidly. Whilst here he met Action Française leader Charles Maurras and became attracted to the brand of integral nationalism that Maurras endorsed. His last major port of call in Europe was Italy where he observed fascism first hand and was attracted by the ideology. On his return to Argentina he resumed his association with Palacio, who was himself on the far right by that point, with the pair collaborating on the Catholic journal Criterio along with Jorge Luis Borges, who only contributed some apolitical poems and did not share their politics, withdrawing from the journal once their support for fascism and Uriburu's coup became more evident. Irazusta criticised democracy and was especially opposed to freedom of religion, arguing that it was part of an anti-Catholic conspiracy designed to promote Protestantism. Such was his opposition to socialism that he argued a civil war would be preferable to a left-wing government in Argentina.

In 1929 he joined his brother, Palacio and Juan Carulla in establishing the Liga Republicana, a group that sought the establishment of an authoritarian conservative regime under the leadership of military strongman General José Félix Uriburu. For his part however Irazusta was less enthusiastic about Uriburu than his fellow leaders and he left Argentina in 1930 to return to Europe, missing Uriburu's coup later that same year.

== Irazusta brothers ==
Upon his return to Argentina in 1931 Julio Irazusta worked closely with his brother Rodolfo as the two sought to develop an Argentine native form of fascism. They worked together closely on the journal Accion Republicana and in this developed a strong nativist line in which they argued against foreign economic involvement in Argentina and the liberalism that they believed this engendered. They came to endorse etatism and a strong governmental role in economic, political and cultural life, advocating some nationalisation, economic modernisation and in increasing emphasis on militarism in the education system. They also contributed widely to LNR as well as the journal Voz del Pueblo which was pro-Nazi in outlook. He was an admirer of Adolf Hitler, describing him as "an eminently sensible man, the complete opposite of the intolerant and presumptuous megalomaniac that his detractors paint him as".

The brothers' best known work was their 1934 book Argentina y el imperialismo británico: Los eslabones de una cadena 1806-1833 which accused the United Kingdom, which had supported Argentina in its attempts to gain independence from Spain, of doing so for ulterior motives i.e. opening up new trade markets and ensuring that the newly independent state would have to rely on them for loans. The book was central to their nationalist, corporatist vision, although it has subsequently become a standard for both left and right. It also played a pivotal role in the development of Argentine claims to the sovereignty of the Falkland Islands by suggesting that taking the Falkland Islands was one of the ways in which the UK had exploited Argentina.

== Rosas scholarship ==
Becoming more involved in academic scholarship after 1935, Julio Irazusta wrote and lectured extensively on Juan Manuel de Rosas who was the subject of revisionism from the far right from 1930, when a hagiographical biography by Carlos Ibarguren appeared, resulting in Rosas being characterised as a model of leadership. Irazusta believed that Rosas was the last great Argentine statesman and he became noted as an expert on Rosas, editing four volumes of his political papers between 1941 and 1950.

Irazusta also wrote biographies of Tomás de Anchorena and other historical figures whilst in 1940 he established a new journal, Nuevo Orden, with his brother.

== Later years ==
Irazusta became involved in the Partido de Unión Republicana and served this party as a deputy from 1939 to 1945. Following the emergence of Juan Peron as president the brothers became involved in the Partido Libertador. The group was initially cautiously pro-Peron but shifted their opinion to one of opposition, accusing Peronism of embracing socialism at the expense of nationalism. Irazusta's 1956 work, Peron y la Crisis Argentine, was a diatribe against Peron, accusing him of breaking with Argentine political traditions by following a pro-British policy. With Rodolfo he established another political party, the Republican Union, in 1955 but by this time he had lost interest in the political arena and concentrated on writing instead.

He published his Memorias in 1975 and retired to his home town of Gualeguaychú, where he died in 1982.
