= Manuel Gálvez =

Argentine writer

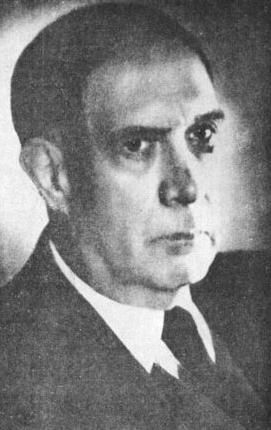
- Born: Manuel Gálvez; 18 July 1882; Paraná, Entre Ríos
- Died: 14 November 1962 (aged 80); Buenos Aires
- Monuments: Bust in Plaza Vicente Lopez, Buenos Aires
- Education: University of Buenos Aires
- Occupation: Inspector of schools
- Known for: Writer
- Notable work: Nacha Regules (1919), Historia de arrabal (1923), Los caminos de la muerte (1928), El general Quiroga (1932)
- Style: Romanticism, Costumbrismo

Manuel Gálvez (18 July 1882 – 14 November 1962) was an Argentine novelist, poet, essayist, historian and biographer.

== Early years ==
Gálvez, a member of one of the leading patrician families of Entre Ríos Province, was educated by the Jesuits before attending the University of Buenos Aires, graduating in 1904 with a law degree. He was employed as a schools inspector from 1906 to 1931.

His early political ideas were somewhat fluid. At university he had helped to found a highly traditionalist literary review called Ideas but soon after graduation he was involved in liberalism before becoming captivated by the Spanish Generation of '98. As such along with the likes of Ricardo Rojas he became part of a Hispanidad movement within Argentine literature that sought closer cultural ties with Spain.

By widely reading the Hispanidad authors and examining their works for a specifically Argentine audience in his own writing Gálvez has been credited for ensuring the spread of the ideology amongst the country's nationalist intellectuals. He also emphasised the centrality of the Roman Catholic Church to Argentine identity.

== Nationalism ==
Between 1906 and 1910 Gálvez became a regular visitor to Spain and these journeys helped to solidify his belief in Hispanidad, as expounded in his 1913 book El Solar de la Raza. Politically he became associated with the rightist nationalism of the country's upper classes and indeed claimed in his collection of essays El Diario de Gabriel Quiroga that he was the first genuine Argentine nationalist in history. He was particularly fixated on the dilution of Argentine culture that he feared was taking place due to what he believed was the influx of Jews, whom he identified with anarchism, Italian peasants, whom he identified with materialism, and international finance, which he believed fuelled decadence and cosmopolitanism. El Solar de la Raza in particular was important to the development of Argentine nationalism, joining Rojas' La Restauracion Nacionalista as one of the two great founding documents of ideological nationalism in the country. The book extolled the virtues of the rural over the urban, rejecting the cosmopolitanism of Argentina's cities and claiming that the true spirit of the nation remained in the countryside away from internationalist influences.

He was the first of the nationalist writers to promote Juan Manuel de Rosas as an archetype of Argentine values, which was later shared by most of his contemporaries. Gálvez's hero worship of Rosas led him to pen a series of five novels set during his rule, to become joint editor of a journal named after Rosas and to serve as Vice President of the Instituto de Investigaciones Historicas 'Juan Manuel de Rosas'. The latter group, which came to specialise in historical revisionism about Argentina, had been established in 1938 by Gálvez, Roberto de Laferrère, Carlos Ibarguren, Ernesto Palacio and Rodolfo and Julio Irazusta.

Although seeking the development of a new and stronger national identity, Gálvez had initially stopped short of supporting any major changes to the country's political system. However, in 1925 Gálvez adopted Italian fascism as his preferred mode of government, arguing that it was the only way to prevent the weak government that he felt was aiding the growth of his declared enemies of communism, immigration and American imperialism. He would also look to the example of the Falange, arguing that these fascist groups were the only ones capable of defending religion and tradition from "Satanic" communism.

He denied charges of anti-Semitism, claiming that he opposed Jewish immigration to Argentina simply because he was anti-immigration rather than anti-Jewish, although he regularly criticised perceived Jewish influence in Argentina and as late as 1962 his novel El Mal Metafisico was criticised for the highly stereotypical portrayal of Jewish characters. However, despite publicly endorsing versions of fascism he always stopped short of full fascism in his writing due to the innate conservatism of his traditionalism and his main political influences were fellow ultra-traditionalists Charles Maurras and Maurice Barrès. Following the election of Juan Perón as president in 1946 Gálvez became a leading figure in the strand of the nationalist movement that enthusiastically supported the new regime.

== Writing ==
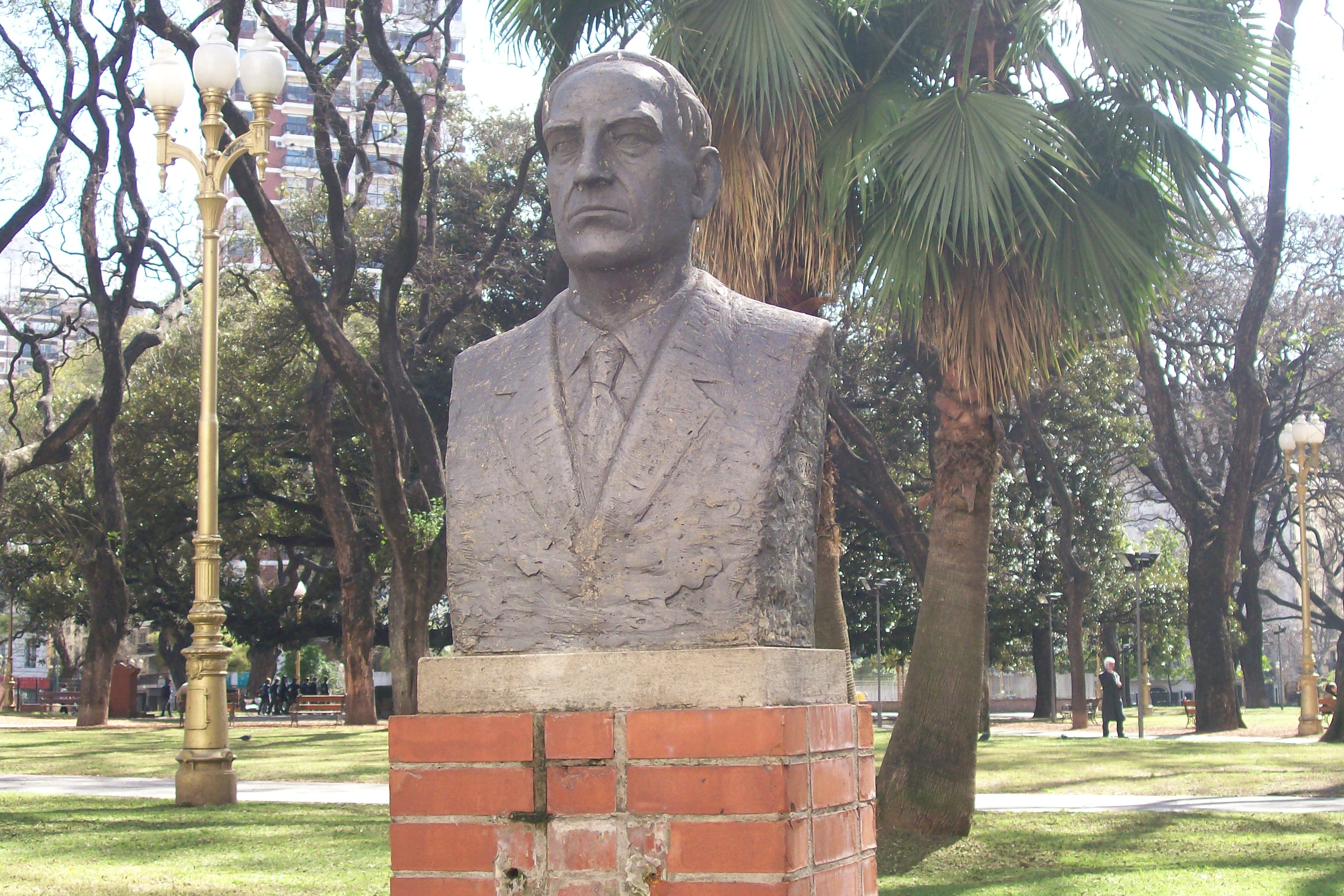
A bust of Gálvez in Buenos Aires.

Gálvez was a prolific writer whose works covered a number of styles and genres. As a novelist his works included La sombra del convento, El cántico espiritual, Miércoles Santo, La tragedia de un hombre fuerte, La noche toca a su fin y Cautiverio, La muerte en las calles (1949), Nacha Regules (1919) and Historia de arrabal (1923), the latter two works proving his most widely celebrated. He was a literary prize winner for both Los caminos de la muerte (1928) and El general Quiroga (1932). His theatrical works include El hombre de los ojos azules (1928) and Calibán (1943).

Gálvez was nominated five times unsuccessfully for the Nobel Prize for Literature: 1932 (loss to John Galsworthy), 1933 (loss to Ivan Bunin), 1934 (loss to Luigi Pirandello), 1951 (loss to Pär Lagerkvist), and 1952 (loss to François Mauriac). He became mildly notorious in Argentine literary circles for what was taken to be unseemly lobbying for the Prize.

His volume of work increased significantly in the 1950s, as he wrote Tiempo de odio y angustia (1951), Han tocado a degüello (1840–1842) (1951), Bajo la garra anglo-francesa (1953), Y así cayó Don Juan Manuel (1954), Las dos vidas del pobre Napoleón (1954), El uno y la multitud (1955), Tránsito Guzmán (1956), Poemas para la recién llegada (1957), Perdido en su noche (1958), Recuerdos de la vida literaria (1961), Me mataron entre todos (1962) and La locura de ser santo (1967) amongst others.

His first poetic work was 1907's El enigma interior, followed in 1909 by the similar Sendero de humildad. He was the art critic of Nostros, a cultural magazine. As an essayist, polemicist and critic he published El solar de la raza (1913), La vida múltiple (1916), Amigos y maestros de mi juventud (1944) and El novelista y las novelas (1959) as well as biographies of such historic figures as Domingo Faustino Sarmiento, Hipólito Yrigoyen and Gabriel García Moreno.

== Personal life ==
He was married to the writer, Delfina Bunge. He died in 1962 in Buenos Aires.

== Works ==
=== Narrative ===
- El diario de Gabriel Quiroga (1910)
- La maestra normal (1914)
- El mal metafísico (1916)
- La sombra del convento (1917)
- Nacha Regules (1919)
- Luna de miel y otras narraciones (1920)
- La tragedia de un hombre fuerte (1922)
- Historia de arrabal (1923)
- El cántico espiritual (1923)
- La pampa y su pasión (1927)
- Una mujer muy moderna (1927)
- Los caminos de la muerte (1928)
- Humaitá (1929)
- Jornadas de agonía (1929)
- Miércoles Santo (1930)
- El gaucho de los cerrillos (1931)
- El general Quiroga (1932)
- Cautiverio (1935)
- La noche toca a su fin (1935)
- Hombres en soledad (1938)
- La ciudad pintada de rojo (1948)
- La muerte en las calles (1949)
- Tiempo de odio y angustia (1951)
- Han tocado a degüello (1840–1842) (1951)
- Bajo la garra anglo-francesa (1953)
- Y así cayó Don Juan Manuel (1954)
- Las dos vidas del pobre Napoleón (1954)
- El uno y la multitud (1955)
- Tránsito Guzmán (1956)
- Poemas para la recién llegada (1957)
- Perdido en su noche (1958)
- Me mataron entre todos (1962)
- La locura de ser santo (1967), phostomous.

=== Autobiography ===
- Recuerdos de la vida literaria (1961)

=== Poetry ===
- El enigma interior, 1907.
- Sendero de humildad, 1909.

=== Essay ===
- El solar de la raza (1913)
- La inseguridad en la vida obrera (1913)
- La vida múltiple (1916)
- Amigos y maestros de mi juventud (1944)
- El novelista y las novelas (1959)

=== Biography ===
- Vida de Hipólito Yrigoyen (1939)
- Vida de Juan Manuel de Rosas (1940), historia novelada.
- Vida de Aparicio Saravia (1942)
- Vida de don Gabriel García Moreno (1942)
- Vida de Domingo Faustino Sarmiento (1945)
- Vida de Ceferino Namuncurá. El santito de la toldería (1947)

=== Drama ===
- El hombre de los ojos azules (1928)
- Calibán (1943).
