= Enrique Ruiz Guiñazú =

Argentine politician

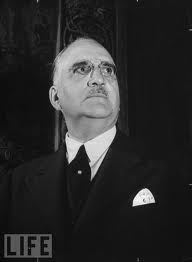
Enrique Ruiz Guiñazú

Enrique Ruiz Guiñazú (14 October 1882 – 13 November 1967) was an Argentine politician who is best remembered for his spell as Minister of Foreign Affairs, International Trade and Worship in the 1940s.

His daughter was Magdalena Ruiz Guiñazú, an Argentine writer and journalist.

== Rise to prominence ==
Ruiz Guiñazú served as both a professor and a banker before into the diplomatic service, with his roles including chief delegate to the League of Nations and ambassador to Switzerland. He was serving as ambassador to the Vatican City when President Ramón Castillo recalled him to take up the post of Foreign Minister. Even before the entry of the United States into the Second World War Ruiz Guiñazú had already accrued a reputation as a fascist sympathiser in that country, with his frequent praising of Benito Mussolini and Francisco Franco leading American diplomat Sumner Welles to write that Ruiz Guiñazú was "one of the stupidest men ever to hold office in Argentina's proud history". Having previously served as ambassador to Spain, where he had been impressed by falangism, Ruiz Guiñazú advocated both neutrality in the Second World War and Hispanidad as Foreign Minister.

== Pro-Axis activity ==
At the Pan-American conference held in Rio de Janeiro in January 1942, Ruiz Guiñazú pushed a pro-Axis powers agenda by ensuring that the wording of the US-led agreement was changed from a 'commitment' to breaking off diplomatic relations with the Axis to a 'recommendation'. Ultimately Castillo kept open relations with Germany, Japan and Italy for the duration of his presidency.

Ostensibly seeking a peace settlement Ruiz Guiñazú and his main advisor Mario Amadeo closely co-operated with the Axis powers, sending Juan Carlos Goyeneche to Europe as their own envoy and asking German ambassador Edmund von Thermann to forward plans for an Argentine-hosted peace summit to Joachim von Ribbentrop in which Nazi rule over Europe would be officially recognised. However the idea came to nothing and Ruiz Guiñazú's time, as Foreign Minister came to an end in 1943.

== Writing ==
Away from politics Ruiz Guiñazú was a noted historian with his 1916 book La Magistratura Indiana considered a central study of justice in Latin America under Spanish rule for many years after it was first published.
