= 1930 Argentine legislative election =

← 1928	2 March 1930	1931 →
- 81 of the 158 seats in the Chamber of Deputies
- Turnout: 74.91%
Party	Vote %	Seats	+/–
Radical Civic Union	43.22	49	+11
Confederation of the Right	20.59	13	−6
Antipersonalist Radicalism	11.42	3	−12
Socialist Party	8.58	1	−3
Independent Socialist Party	7.68	10	+10
Democratic Progressive Party	4.02	3	+3
Lencinist Radical Civic Union	1.34	1	+1
Blockist Radical Civic Union	0.20	1	−1
This lists parties that won seats. See the complete results below.
Results by province

Legislative elections were held in Argentina on 2 March 1930 to elect members of the Chamber of Deputies. Voter turnout was 75%.

== Background ==
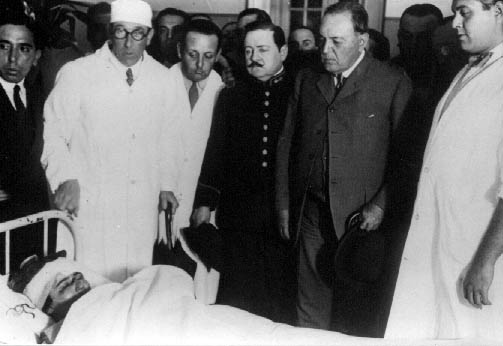
President Yrigoyen visits a wounded policeman following one of numerous clashes during his last year in office.

The Wall Street crash of 1929, as in much of the rest of the world, abruptly clouded Argentina's political, as well as economic, landscape. Hipólito Yrigoyen, who was overwhelmingly returned to the Presidency in 1928, advanced a progressive agenda during his first year in office, establishing a Ministry of Health, securing trade pacts with the British Empire that promoted import substitution industrialization, and increasing investments in education, the sciences, and the state oil concern, YPF.

This latter policy made his administration a target of Standard Oil, which had growing interests in the country's energy sector. Yrigoyen's second term inherited considerable domestic opposition, as well, from his 1916—22 administration, when policy differences with the conservative wing of the UCR provoked his removal of 18 governors by decree. This opposition had never achieved unity, however, and were no match for Yrigoyen's popularity.

The collapse that followed the 1929 crash proved to be real challenge for Yrigoyen. Scorned by much of the media for his age and alleged senility, the president reacted quickly to the crisis. He loosened credit, moved to delay farm evictions, and intervened against massive capital flight by rescinding the gold standard in Argentina, thereby stymying the movement of gold overseas (around 200 million dollars' worth had been removed from local banks after the crash via this mechanism). These measures helped maintain the populist leader's base of support, as did possibly the 24 December 1929, attempt on his life, and only added to its opposition by the financial sector.

The results of the legislative elections, held on 2 March 1930, reflected some erosion in Yrigoyen's base, as the UCR lost 19% off its 1928 landslide vote totals. Turnout remained high, however, and the UCR added six seats to their already commanding majority in the Lower House. Winning in 10 of 14 districts renewing seats, the UCR lost in the City of Buenos Aires, where a schism in the Socialist Party resulted in victory for the more conservative group, the Independent Socialists. Right-wing opposition also won in Córdoba Province, where Julio Roca's Democratic Party made gains.

Having lost at the ballot box, Yrigoyen's opponents in both domestic politics and foreign corporate boardrooms redoubled their efforts, marshaling news editorials, provincial legislatures and, ultimately, elements in the Argentine military against the aging leader. An August 9 resolution in the Lower House, signed by 44 conservatives, called for Yrigoyen's resignation, and following numerous clashes and acts of sabotage, Generals José Félix Uriburu and Agustín Justo took power in a September 6 coup d'état.

== Results ==
Party or alliance		Votes	%	Seats	
Party or alliance		Votes	%	Won	Total
Radical Civic Union		622,961	43.22	49	100
Confederation of the Right	Conservative Party	154,246	10.70	6	13
Confederation of the Right	Democratic Party of Córdoba	78,050	5.41	4	8
Confederation of the Right	Liberal Party of Corrientes	19,465	1.35	1	1
Confederation of the Right	Autonomist Party of Corrientes	17,135	1.19	0	2
Confederation of the Right	Liberal Party of Tucumán	14,292	0.99	1	2
Confederation of the Right	Provincial Union	7,231	0.50	1	1
Confederation of the Right	Liberal Party of Mendoza	6,435	0.45	0	0
Confederation of the Right	Total	296,854	20.59	13	27
Antipersonalist Radicalism	Unified Radical Civic Union	52,593	3.65	1	5
Antipersonalist Radicalism	Antipersonalist Radical Civic Union	47,785	3.32	2	3
Antipersonalist Radicalism	Radical Civic Union (Caballerista)	23,437	1.63	0	0
Antipersonalist Radicalism	Opposition Radical Civic Union	13,402	0.93	0	0
Antipersonalist Radicalism	Radical Civic Union (Corvalanista)	10,074	0.70	0	0
Antipersonalist Radicalism	Radical Civic Union (Figueroísta)	6,558	0.45	0	0
Antipersonalist Radicalism	Principist Radical Civic Union	3,481	0.24	0	0
Antipersonalist Radicalism	Dissident Radical Civic Union	3,394	0.24	0	0
Antipersonalist Radicalism	Red Radical Civic Union	2,025	0.14	0	0
Antipersonalist Radicalism	Tucumán Radical Civic Union	1,905	0.13	0	0
Antipersonalist Radicalism	Total	164,654	11.42	3	8
Socialist Party		123,680	8.58	1	1
Independent Socialist Party		110,761	7.68	10	16
Democratic Progressive Party		57,996	4.02	3	3
Lencinist Radical Civic Union		19,378	1.34	1	2
Provincial Defence–White Flag		12,778	0.89	0	0
Public Health Party		12,307	0.85	0	0
Communist Party of Argentina		6,863	0.48	0	0
Blockist Radical Civic Union		2,885	0.20	1	1
Agrarian Party		2,476	0.17	0	0
Communist Party of the Argentine Republic		2,361	0.16	0	0
Popular Party		2,263	0.16	0	0
Others		3,204	0.22	0	0
Total		1,441,421	100.00	81	158
Valid votes		1,441,421	97.83		
Invalid/blank votes		31,920	2.17		
Total votes		1,473,341	100.00		
Registered voters/turnout		1,983,246	74.29		
Source: Cantón, Diario Santa Fe, Chamber of Deputies
