= Ernesto Palacio (writer) =

Argentine historian

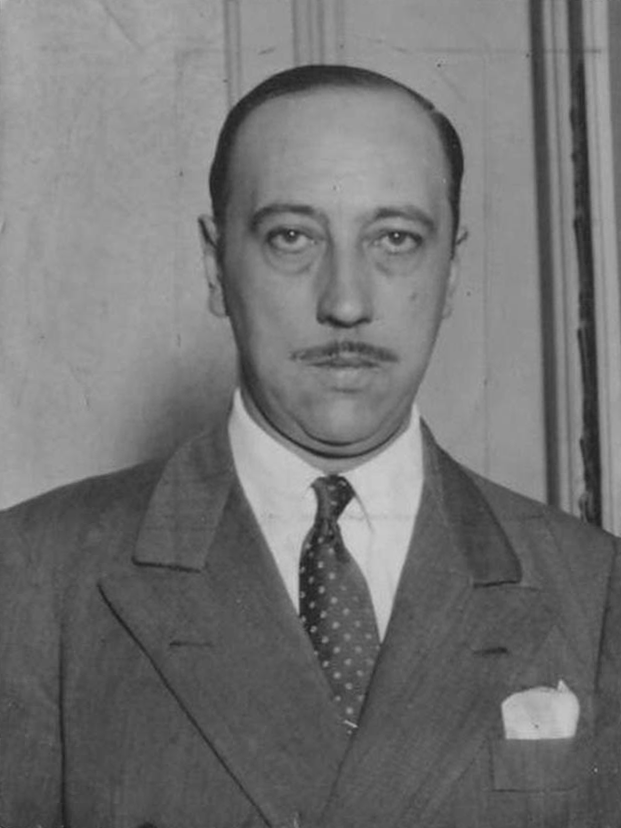
Ernesto Palacio

Ernesto Palacio (4 January 1900 in San Martín – 3 January 1979 in Buenos Aires) was an Argentine historian and part of a generation of right-wing nationalist intellectuals active from the 1920s. Their ideology is referred to as Nacionalismo.

== Early years ==
Palacio, who was educated at the University of Buenos Aires, was a founder of the avant-garde magazine Martín Fierro and began his political life as an anarchist. However he was attracted to nationalism because the movement promised regeneration of Argentine society and at the same time he became a fervent follower of the Roman Catholic Church. The main influence in his conversion was his friend César Pico and Spanish thinker Ramiro de Maeztu, of whose writings Palacio became a follower.

Following the 1930 coup d'état, Palacio briefly held the position of Minister of the Interior and Public Education in the province of San Juan.

== Nationalist activity ==
He wrote regularly for La Nueva Republica (LNR), the right-wing journal established in 1927 that formed the basis for nationalist revival in Argentina's elite. Sharing editing duties with the likes of Juan Carulla, Rodolfo Irazusta and his brother Julio, Roberto de Laferrere and César Pico, the journal developed an Integralist platform based on the ideas of Leopoldo Lugones. He also edited the weekly journal Nuevo Orden which first appeared in July 1940 and presented hard-line Catholic opinions. An enthusiastic fascist, he sought to marry the ideology more closely with religion, arguing that a strongly religious fascist dictator could realise the dream of the "Kingdom of God on Earth". As a writer for this journal, as well as in his capacity as founder and leader of the minor Partido Libertador became a leading voice for anti-British sentiment. He was also a harsh critic of the contribution of indigenous people to Argentine life, and argued for a fully white country.

Palacio was one of the members of his generation who became an enthusiast for Peronism and in 1946 he was elected to the Argentine Chamber of Deputies as a coalition candidate. Remaining a deputy until 1952, he claimed to have joined the movement because of the authoritarianism demonstrated by Juan Perón.

== Writing ==
As a historian Palacio's best known work was his two volume Historia de la Argentina 1515-1976, the final edition of which appeared in 1979. He was also for a time the director of the literary magazine Sur. As an academic he was chair of ancient and Argentine history at the Escuela Comercial de Mujeres from 1931 to 1938 and was appointed as professor of geography at Justo José de Urquiza College in 1942.

== Works ==
- La Inspiración y la Gracia ("Inspiration and Grace"), Buenos Aires, Editorial Gleizer, 1929.
- Catilina. La revolución contra la plutocracia en Roma ("Catilina. The Revolution Against the Plutocracy in Rome"), Buenos Aires, Editorial Rosso, 1935.
- El Espíritu y la Letra ("The Spirit and the Letter"), Buenos Aires, Editorial Serviam, 1936.
- Historia de Roma ("History of Rome"), Buenos Aires, Editorial Albatros, 1939.
- Teoría del Estado ("Theory of the State"), Buenos Aires, Editorial Política, 1949.
- La historia falsificada ("The Falsified History"), Buenos Aires, A. Peña Lillo Editor, 1960.
- Historia de la Argentina 1515-1938 ("History of Argentina 1515-1938"), Buenos Aires, Ediciones Alpe, 1954.
