= Juan Carulla =

Argentine physician and nationalist politician

- Born: Juan Emiliano Carulla; July 20, 1888; Villaguay, Argentina
- Died: November 20, 1968 (aged 80)
- Occupation: Physician
- Known for: Political writer
- Notable work: Genio de la Argentina (1943)

Juan Emiliano Carulla (20 July 1888 – 20 November 1968) was an Argentine physician and nationalist politician. He was most prominent under the military regime in power during the early 1930s.

== In France ==
A native of the Entre Ríos Province, Carulla trained as a medical doctor. In his early years, Carulla was a supporter of anarchism but this changed after a trip to Europe during the First World War. Carulla enlisted in the French Army as a field doctor and became convinced that the left had done nothing to help the war effort. Whilst in France he became a strong supporter of Action Française. Like many of his contemporaries in France, Carulla had been exposed to the syndicalism of Georges Sorel which, despite its avowedly leftist bent, was influential on the integrism of Charles Maurras with a number of French leftists of the time switching to this far right creed.

== Argentine far-right ==
Following his return to Argentina, Carulla established his own journal, La Voz Nacional, in 1925. He showed strong support for Germany and a preference for tradition and heredity as the bases of government. He became associated with the followers of Leopoldo Lugones and, along with Rodolfo Irazusta, helped to found and edit the journal La Nueva República (LNR) in 1927. He also produced his own journal, Bandera Argentina, which campaigned strongly against female suffrage, dismissing it as "insanity". This journal contained the writings in which Carulla came closest to endorsing the fascism that was growing in Europe at the time. In his memoirs he admitted that this journal had received assistance from the German embassy. His work with LNR was pivotal to the development of Argentina's anti-establishment far right as it represented a break from the old traditionalism and a new endorsement of corporatism and a fascist-inspired nationalism. In his work for the magazine Carulla emphasised anti-Semitism and wrote of perceived Jewish conspiracies to take over Argentina.

Along with Julio Irazusta, Carulla asked right-wing General José Félix Uriburu to lead a coup against the liberal government of Hipólito Yrigoyen in 1927. The general declined at that stage but agreed in 1930, forming a new right-wing dictatorship in which Carulla enjoyed influence. He was to form part of the Maurras-inspired elite, alongside the Irazusta brothers, Ernesto Palacio, Bruno Jacovella and others, who took up their pens in defence of the new regime and effectively supplied it with an ideology. Cerulla in particular enjoyed strong influence and it was he who was behind the idea of merging all Uriburu's supporters into one militia group, the Argentine Civic Legion, under the general's government, a move that was seen as pivotal in the fascistisation of the Uriburu regime. He was also involved in a number of rightist groups, all of which were pro-Uriburu, including the Republican League, a group patterned after Action Française, the National Party established by Alberto Viñas and Carlos Silveyra in 1930, and the Agrupación Teniente General Uriburu set up in 1932.

== Later writing ==
He was strongly interested in the cultural implications of the Spanish language, and in his book Genio de la Argentina (1943) he wrote that the common language formed a strong basis for close links with Spain, thus endorsing the Hispanidad ideas championed by Manuel Gálvez. He was also a harsh critic of democracy, arguing that it was a product of the French Revolution that was alien and irrelevant to Hispanic countries, which, he contended, required authoritarian governments. He further believed in the importance of the family and looked to Francisco Franco in his desire to establish a "juvenile Falange" in which young men would be organised at the disposal of the government.

Carulla abandoned his fascist sympathies in the late 1940s and played little role in public life thereafter. His autobiography, Al Filo del Medio Siglo, was published in 1951.
