= Rodolfo Irazusta =

Argentine writer and politician

Rodolfo Irazusta (5 June 1897 – 1967) was an Argentine writer and politician who was one of the leading lights of the nationalist movement of the 1920s and 1930s. He collaborated closely with his younger brother Julio Irazusta throughout his career.

== Right-wing politics ==
Irazusta was born close to the Rincón del Cura area of Gualeguaychú, Entre Ríos into a family noted for its support of radical politics. Irazusta first came to prominence through his association with the journal La Nueva Republica (LNR), of which he became editor soon after its establishment. It was founded in 1927 by the followers of the ideas of Leopoldo Lugones and was edited by the likes of Juan Carulla as well as the Irazusta brothers. The aim of LNR was to take the ruling classes away from the prevailing liberalism of the time to more counterrevolutionary, Maurrasian ideals. LNR endorsed corporatism and represented a move away from the traditionalism that had tended to be the hallmark of right wing critics of the system in Argentina to a new, hard-line nationalism. Irazusta was particularly noted as a harsh critic of democracy and he wrote that as a concept it was not in the Constitution and that it led to disorder. He further argued that democracy encouraged the growth of parasitic administrators and well as too much influence from foreign-owned businesses. Further he denounced it as being anti-Catholic and thus incompatible with the central role that he felt the Catholic Church should hold in Argentina.

As representatives of the semi-fascist right Irazusta and Carulla approached General José Félix Uriburu in 1927 to ask him to lead a coup against the presidency of Hipólito Yrigoyen but he declined. Despite the setback, Irazusta joined with Roberto de Laferrère to create the Liga Republicana (Republican League), a fascistic anti-government youth militia. Ultimately Uriburu did lead a coup in 1930 after his retirement from the army and the Irazustas enjoyed high profiles during his government. Indeed they were part of an intellectual movement along with the likes of Carulla, Ernesto Palacio and Bruno Jacovella who wrote in favour of a corporatist, Maurrasian system and so became the ideologues of the Uriburu regime.

== Irazusta brothers ==
The Irazustas continued to write prolifically, contributing widely to LNR as well as to the journal Voz del Pueblo which was pro-Nazi in outlook. From 1931 they worked together closely on the journal Acción Republicana and in this developed a strong nativist line in which they argued against foreign economic involvement in Argentina and the liberalism that they believed this engendered. The brothers endorsed etatism and a strong governmental role in economic, political and cultural life, advocating some nationalisation, economic modernisation and in increasing emphasis on militarism in the education system. In 1940 they established a further journal, Nuevo Orden, to disseminate their political views.

The brothers' best-known work was their 1934 book Argentina y el imperialismo británico: Los eslabones de una cadena, 1806-1833 which accused the United Kingdom, which had supported Argentina in its attempts to gain independence from Spain, of doing so for ulterior motives i.e. opening up new trade markets and ensuring that the newly independent state would have to rely on them for loans. The book was central to their nationalist, corporatist vision, although it has subsequently become a standard for both left and right. It also played a pivotal role in the development of Argentine claims to the sovereignty of the Falkland Islands by suggesting that taking the Falkland Islands was one of the ways in which the UK had exploited Argentina.

== Later years ==
Following the emergence of Juan Perón as President the brothers became involved in the Partido Libertador. The group was initially cautiously pro-Perón but shifted their opinion to one of opposition, accusing Peronism of embracing socialism at the expense of nationalism. Irazusta's 1956 work, Perón y la crisis argentina, was a diatribe against Perón, accusing him of breaking with Argentine political traditions by following a pro-British policy. With Julio he established another political party, the Republican Union, in 1955 but this made little headway, with Julio retiring from politics soon after its formation. The party was wound up in 1957 and Irazusta largely disappeared from public life. He died in 1967.
