= Argentine Civic Legion =

Argentine Civic Legion Legión Cívica Argentina
- Leader: José Félix Uriburu; Juan Bautista Molina
- Founded: 1930
- Dissolved: 1944
- Preceded by: Argentine Patriotic League; Republican League
- Succeeded by: Alliance of Nationalist Youth; Argentine Nationalist Action; Nationalist Liberation Alliance
- Headquarters: Buenos Aires
- Newspaper: Combate (1930-1940)
- Student wing: Nationalist Union of Secondary Students
- Youth wing: Alianza de la Juventud Nacionalista
- Armed wing: Camisas negras argentinas
- Ideology: Nacionalismo; Corporatism; Argentine nationalism Fascism; Ultranationalism; Uriburism; Clerical Fascism; Anticapitalism; Anticommunism; National Catholicism; Anti-Yrigoyenism; Militarism
- Political position: Far-right
- Anthem: ¡Viva la Patria!

Party flag

The Argentine Civic Legion (Legión Cívica Argentina, LCA) was a Argentine nationalist and fascist militia. It was recognized as a political entity on 20 May 1931 and received juridical personality on 11 January 1932. In 1937, the Legion was succeeded and replaced by the Alliance of Nationalist Youth. The Legion was formed by Argentine President General José Félix Uriburu officially as a reserve for Argentina's armed forces. The Legion's members were authorized to receive military training. The Legion declared itself to be made up of "patriotic men" who embodied "the spirit of the September revolution and who morally and materially were ready to cooperate in the institutional reconstruction of the country". The Legion was the largest nationalist organization in Argentina in the early 1930s. The Legion is known to have committed acts of violence against its political opponents and tortured those that were captured.

The Legion was heavily influenced by fascism, with its members utilizing the Roman salute, wearing fascist-style uniforms, and marching in military formation. The Legion's declaration of principles attacked Marxism and democracy and declared support for the creation of a corporatist state like that of Fascist Italy. The Legion cooperated with the Argentine Fascist Party, particularly in the Córdoba region of Argentina. In Córdoba in 1935, the local Legion allied with the Argentine Fascist Party and Argentine Nationalist Action to form the Frente de Fuerzas Fascistas de Córdoba, which was replaced by the National Fascist Union in 1936. In 1936, the Legion's leader General Juan Bautista Molina reorganized the Legion to be based upon the organization of the Nazi Party. General Molina wanted an Argentina based on Nazi lines, presenting himself as an Argentine Hitler, and having close relations with Nazi Germany.

The Legion was violently anti-Semitic, with its journal Combate issuing a "commandment" to its members: "War against the Jew. Hatred towards the Jew. Death to the Jew."

The Legion had a student wing called the Nationalist Union of Secondary Students (Unión Nacionalista des Estudiantes Secundarios, UNES). Unlike other Argentine nationalist organizations of the time, the Legion had a women's section, while other nationalist groups excluded women from their organizations. The Legion's women section called Agrupación Femenina de la LCA promoted women to love the armed forces and respect for order, authority, and hierarchy in the home and school. These women were to provide aid to the poor to assist in establishing social peace.

The Legion's paramilitary unit which caused controversy and resulted in the government enacting a law to disarm private armed forces.

== History ==
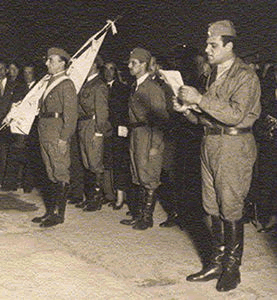
The Argentine Civic Legion (LCA), May 1932

was officially formed as a reserve for the Argentine armed forces. It was recognized as a political entity on May 20, 1931—the only one authorized to operate during the de facto government—and was granted legal status on January 11, 1932. Members of the movement were permitted to receive military training. Uriburu dubbed them the “Argentine Blackshirts,” modeled after Benito Mussolini’s voluntary combat militias. The Legion declared itself to be composed of “patriotic men” who embodied “the spirit of the September revolution” and were “morally and materially prepared to cooperate in the institutional reconstruction of the country.” The Legion was the largest nationalist organization in Argentina during the early 1930s.

The first president of the Legion’s Superior Council was the physician Floro Lavalle. The movement was structured according to a military logic, adopting Law 4707—which regulated the functioning of the country’s Armed Forces—as its organizational model. Consequently, the Legion also initially featured a Supreme Command, with infantry officer Alfredo Argüero Fragueyro serving as its Chief of Staff. The organization established branches throughout Argentine territory. Among its most notable members were journalists Juan E. Carulla, Guillermo Gallardo, Santiago Díaz Vieyra, and Guillermo Lasserre Mármol; lawyers Juan P. Ramos, Alberto Uriburu, and Santiago Rey Basadre; notary Juan Manuel Tobio; banker Federico Gerónimo Leloir; businessman Marcelo de Lezica; physician Juan B. Llosa; military officers Filomeno Velazco, Nicolás Accame, Alberto de Oliveira Cézar, Jacinto Hernández, Ricardo Harriague Castex, Juan R. Jones, Arturo Brinkmann, and Horacio Röttjer; and politician Benjamín Villafañe. The organization also attracted a group of young men who would later distinguish themselves within the nationalist movement, including Arturo Palenque Carreras, Juan Queraltó, Emilio Samyn Ducó, Luis F. Gallardo, and Luis María de Pablo Pardo. The Legion’s initial activities were focused on the public expression of patriotic sentiment; members participated in events and parades, carrying flags and singing nationalist songs. A Women’s Group was established within the Legion, led by Josefina Meyer de Lavalle, Adela Gramajo de Patrón Costas, and Magdalena Bustamante de Paz Anchorena. This group functioned as a bona fide charitable society, providing assistance and education to families in need. The Children’s Civic Legion was also established; on May 29, 1931, it was recognized by the National Council of Education as an “institution dedicated to civic and patriotic education, of an apolitical nature,” which authorized it to “use, upon request, school premises and physical exercise grounds” under the jurisdiction of the aforementioned Council.

=== During the Justo Presidency ===
With the rise of Agustín P. Justo to power, the organization lost its ties to the government. Consequently, many civilian members withdrew to join various political parties, while military members were compelled to cease training the legionaries. An internal debate arose regarding the approach the organization’s members should adopt: whether to take to the streets to engage in direct confrontation with communists, anarchists, and Yrigoyenist Radicals, or to focus on disseminating national values through cultural promotion. Lavalle, Ramos, and Uriburu led the latter faction; they subsequently broke away from the Civic Legion and chose to establish the Argentine Nationalist Action (*Acción Nacionalista Argentina*). Carlos R. Ribero then assumed leadership of the organization. One of the new leader’s first initiatives was to propose the creation of the Argentine Nationalist Workers’ Federation (*Federación Obrera Nacionalista Argentina*—FONA)—a trade union umbrella organization intended to curb the influence of the Left among the working class. Carlos Navarro Otero and Luis Lado Vidal were placed at the helm of this structure, where they championed a fiercely anti-capitalist discourse. Over time, FONA gained increasing autonomy, eventually distancing itself from Ribero’s command a few years later.

In 1933, members of the Legion joined an initiative to form a coalition called "Guardia Argentina" (Argentine Guard), intended to unite various nationalist forces that opposed the government but had been operating without coordination. Although the movement enjoyed the backing of two highly prominent figures of the era—Leopoldo Lugones and Abel Renard—it proved impossible to agree on a coherent plan of action, and within a few months, the initiative dissolved. The failure of these plans to regain power led some members, dissatisfied with Ribero’s leadership, to break away. This resulted in the creation of the "Milicia Cívica Nacionalista" (Nationalist Civic Militia), led by Hernández, and the "Legión Nacionalista" (Nationalist Legion), commanded by Alberto de Oliveira Cézar. Violent street clashes with leftists prompted the progressive press to claim that the members of the "Legión Cívica" were importing and promoting Italian fascism and German National Socialism—an accusation the organization took pains to deny. (Even the writer Manuel Gálvez accused them of imitating a European-style militarism, which he deemed futile for the nation's well-being.) In the National Congress, deputies Uberto Vignart, Abraham de la Vega, and Manuel Fresco defended the Legion against attempts by other lawmakers to have the organization banned. The organization placed itself at the disposal of Accame to support him in a potential coup d'état against Justo; however, that conspiracy never materialized.

In 1935, the legionaries came to the defense of Federico Martínez de Hoz, the conservative governor of the province of Buenos Aires who had decided to oppose the corrupt regime of Justo. As a result, Ribero ended up briefly serving as an official in the Buenos Aires provincial government. A few months later, through the influence of Molina, the Legion joined the Provisional Junta of Argentine Nationalism, with the goal of intervening in the maneuvers that civilians and the military were planning to overthrow the president; however, these plans failed. From within the organization, Queraltó established the Nationalist Union of Secondary Students as a youth wing, but this group eventually distanced itself from the Legion to form its own independent movement, known as the Alliance of Nationalist Youth. Around the same time, Carulla also left the Legion, accusing it of failing to pursue the creation of a patriotic union with right-wing forces—a union intended to halt what he perceived as an imminent communist offensive against the country.

=== During the presidencies of Ortiz and Castillo ===
The evolution of nationalist ideas during the 1930s led to the emergence of new groups, which sapped the momentum of the Legion. By 1938, it was largely perceived as a collection of nostalgic "Uriburistas"—adherents to the ideology of José Félix Uriburu—who sought to revive a regime that had failed to implement any of its proposed objectives. The outbreak of the Second World War revitalized the organization, as its members joined the campaign for Argentina to maintain neutrality in the international conflict—even though, in previous years, they had publicly expressed their sympathies for Mussolini’s Italy and Hitler’s Germany. In 1941, the Legion openly supported the *Consejo Superior del Nacionalismo* (Superior Council of Nationalism). This brought the organization once again under the scrutiny of the National Congress, which had established the Special Investigative Commission on Anti-Argentine Activities as a body tasked with the persecution and censorship of the nationalist movement.

=== Dissolution ===
Around 1943, the already dwindling number of members within the Legion threw their support behind the new government of Pedro Pablo Ramírez. By the middle of the following year, the national government—now led by Edelmiro Farrell—requested that the Legion’s leaders provide information regarding their assets, resources, and membership. When they failed to respond to this demand, the decision was made to permanently revoke the organization’s legal status. Ribero attempted to keep the organization active for a few years, but a lack of adherents ultimately led to its definitive disappearance from the Argentine political landscape.

== Media outlets ==
The Argentine Civic Legion published several magazines that served as the organization’s official press organs: *Combate*, *Tacuara*, and *Voz Nacionalista*. Furthermore, they also received significant coverage from the nationalist press of the era, most notably from *Bandera Argentina* and *Crisol*.

== LCA Anthem ==
The organization registered two songs as its anthem: "¡Viva la patria!" by José Arenas in 1931, and "Legión Cívica Argentina" by Ernesto Nucci in 1936. The former was even recorded by Carlos Gardel, the preeminent Argentine popular idol of the 1930s. The lyrics are as follows:

La niebla gris rasgó veloz,

el vuelo de un avión. y fue el triunfal amanecer de la revolución.

Y como ayer, el inmortal 1810, salió a la calle el pueblo radiante de altivez.

No era un extraño el opresor cual de un siglo atrás, pero en el mismo el pabellón que quiso arrebatar.

Y al resguardar la libertad, del trágico malón la voz eterna y pura por las calles resonó:

¡Viva la Patria! y la gloria de ser libre. ¡Viva la Patria! que quisieron mancillar.

Orgulloso de ser argentino, al trazar nuestros nuevos destinos, ¡Viva la Patria! De rodillas en su altar.

Y la legión que construyó la nacionalidad, nos alentó, nos dirigió desde la eternidad.

Entrelazados vio avanzar la capital del sur, soldados y tribunos, linaje y multitud.

Amanecer primaveral de la Revolución, de tu vergel, cada mujer fue una fragante flor.

Y hasta tiño tu pabellón la sangre juvenil, haciendo más glorioso nuestro grito varonil.

¡Viva la Patria! y la gloria de ser libre. ¡Viva la Patria! que quisieron mancillar.

Orgulloso de ser argentino, al trazar nuestros nuevos destinos, ¡Viva la Patria!

De rodillas en su altar.
