= Patriotic Leagues (Southern Cone) =

Nationalistic groups in Argentina and Chile (1910s to 1930s)

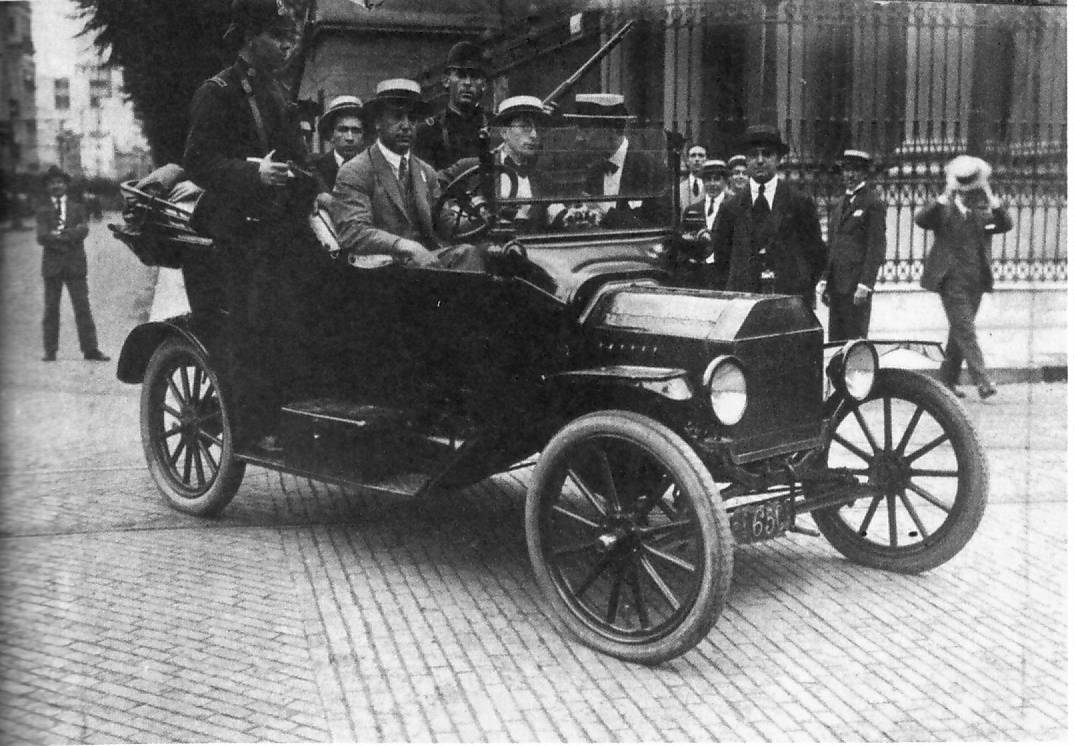
Armed members of the Argentine Patriotic League roaming the streets of Buenos Aires.

The Patriotic Leagues (Spanish: Ligas patrióticas) were nationalistic political groups in Argentina and Chile active from the 1910s to the 1930s. The Patriotic Leagues were characterized by actions against foreigners (Note: Peruvians of Tacna, Arica, and Tarapacá were technically not foreigners) and opposition towards labour movements. They were often constituted as paramilitary groups or secret societies.

== In Argentina ==
The Argentine Patriotic League (Liga Patriótica Argentina) was a Nacionalista paramilitary group, officially created in Buenos Aires on January 16, 1919, during the Tragic week events. Presided over by Manuel Carlés, a professor at the Military College and the Escuela Superior de Guerra, it also counted among its members the deputy Santiago G. O'Farrell (1861-1926). The League was merged into the Argentine Civic Legion in 1931.

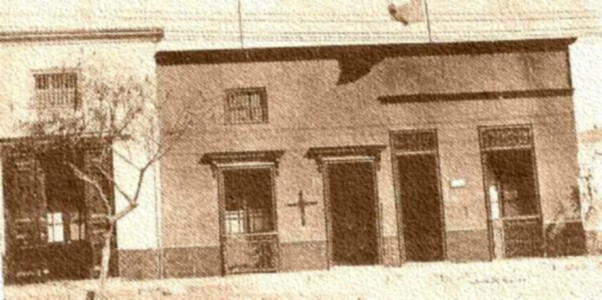
Chilenization of Tacna. Peruvian household harassed by being marked with a black cross. In the background a Chilean flag.

== In Chile ==
In Chile the Patriotic Leagues appeared in 1910. Even if they appeared in several Chilean cities they concentrated their activity in the provinces of Antofagasta, Tarapacá and Tacna, those that were annexed during the War of the Pacific (1879-1883). In these places the Patriotic Leagues launched attacks against Peruvian newspapers, societies and citizens contributing to the Chilenization of Tacna, Arica and Tarapacá. The passivity of the Chilean authorities of Iquique helped the Patriotic Leagues to achieve their principal goal: to frighten the Tarapacán families of Peruvian origin. The situation was particularly problematic in Arica and Tacna, where a plebiscite was to determine their national future as either under the rule of Chile or Peru. The plebiscite in the end was never held, and the solution between both South American countries was achieved through the Tacna–Arica compromise.

The Patriotic Leagues caused the expulsion of Peruvians with actions where violence was the principal instrument. Murder, robbery, discrimination and abuses of all kinds were everyday things. (...) It's clear that these were dramatic events in the Tarapacan lands

— Lautaro Núñez, in El Dios Cautivo

== See also ==
- Expulsion of Chileans from Bolivia and Peru in 1879
