= Front of Fascist Forces of Córdoba =

Front of Fascist Forces of Córdoba Frente de Fuerzas Fascistas de Córdoba
- Founded: 1935
- Dissolved: 1936
- Preceded by: Argentine Nationalist Action; Nationalist Liberation Alliance; Argentine Fascist Party
- Succeeded by: National Fascist Union
- Headquarters: Cordoba
- Ideology: Fascism; Argentine nationalism
- Political position: Far-right

The Frente de Fuerzas Fascistas de Córdoba (Front of Fascist Forces of Córdoba) was a far-right Argentine political front formed in 1935 by an alliance of the Córdoba Province Nationalist Liberation Alliance militia and the Argentine Fascist Party. The Front was replaced by the National Fascist Union in 1936.

== History ==
The Fascist Forces Front of Córdoba (Frente de Fuerzas Fascistas de Córdoba) was an Argentine far-right political and paramilitary coalition founded in the province of Córdoba in 1935. The group emerged during the so-called "Infamous Decade" (Década Infame) as an attempt to unify the various sectors of Catholic nationalism and fascism that were active in the country's interior.

In 1935, with the goal of consolidating its forces in the region, the Córdoba branch of the Argentine Fascist Party forged an alliance with the local militia of the Alianza Libertadora Nacionalista (then linked to the Alianza Juvenil Nacionalista) and with the faction known as Acción Nacionalista Argentina (which at the time was adopting the name Partido Nacionalista Laborista). From this convergence, the Frente de Fuerzas Fascistas de Córdoba was formally established.

=== Activity and dissolution ===
The coalition advocated for the establishment of a corporatist state inspired by the regime of Benito Mussolini in Italy, infused with a strong traditionalist Catholic and anti-communist character. Its members adopted fascist symbolism, held paramilitary-style parades, and maintained ties with other right-wing organizations, such as the Argentine Civic Legion.

However, the front was short-lived. In 1936, under the leadership of Nimio de Anquín, the group was dissolved and reorganized to make way for a broader, more centralized structure: the National Fascist Union (UNF), which continued the political activity of this faction until the end of the decade.

== See also ==
- Argentine Fascist Party
- National Fascist Union
- Argentine Nationalist Action
- Nationalist Liberation Alliance
- Argentine Civic Legion
