= Patriotic League =

Patriotic League may refer to:

- Patriotic League (Bosnia and Herzegovina), a Bosnian paramilitary unit of the Yugoslav Wars
- Patriotic League (Estonia), a political movement during the mid-1930s
- Patriotic Leagues (Southern Cone) nationalistic paramilitary groups active in Argentina and Chile in early 20th century

- Argentine Patriotic League
