= Argentine Nationalist Action =

Argentine Nationalist Action Acción Nacionalista Argentina
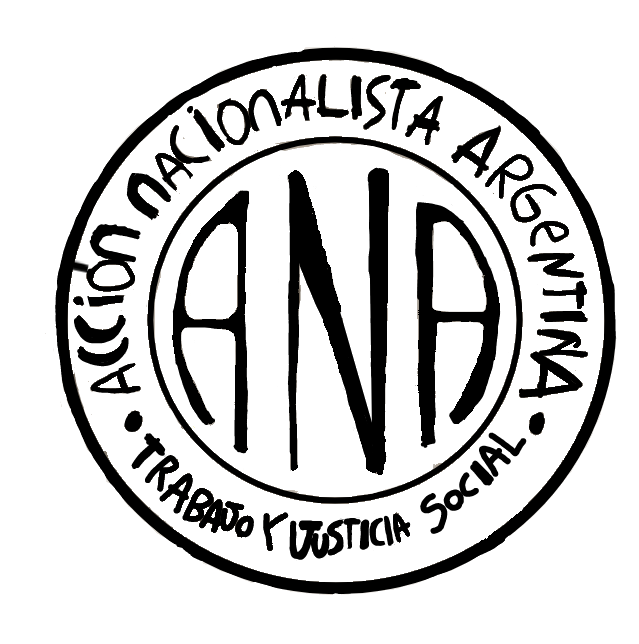
- Historic Leader: Juan P. Ramos
- Founder: Juan P. Ramos
- Founded: 1° 1932 (As Argentine Nationalist Action); 2° 1933 (as Affirmation of a new Argentina); 3° 1933 (transformed into Labor Nationalism Party)
- Dissolved: 1936
- Newspaper: Voz Nacionalista
- Membership (1932): 15.000 (in its beginnings)
- Ideology: Fascism; Nacionalismo; Third position Anticapitalism; Anti-communism; Nazism; Antisemitism
- Political position: Far-right
- Slogan: "God, country, order, work and social justice"

Argentine Nationalist Action Later named Affirmation of a New Argentina was a nationalist and fascist political party in Argentina which existed between 1932 and 1936.

== History ==
It was founded in 1932 as Argentine Nationalist Action by Juan P. Ramos, and maintained strong connections with the Argentine Civic Legion and the Argentine Fascist Party. He was financially supported by the German Embassy in Argentina because he was openly anti-Semitic and pro-Nazi and of a character Nationalist, anti-communist, anti-capitalist and fascist.

The Argentine Nationalist Action declared some support for José Félix Uriburu and his government. In 1933 it was renamed Affirmation of a New Argentina, and a short time later it would become the "Labor Nationalism Party", which would be active until 1935, when the Nationalist Youth Alliance allied itself with the Argentine Fascist Party and the Labor Nacionalism Party to form the Córdoba Fascist Forces Front, which was replaced by the Fascist National Union in 1936.
