= Nacionalismo =

Argentine far-right nationalist movement

Flag of the Nacionalistas. The colours represent the national colours of Argentina while the cross represents Christianity.

Nacionalismo was a mainly far-right Argentine nationalist movement that around 1910 grew out of the "traditionalist" position, which was based on nostalgia for feudal economic relations and a more "organic" social order. It became a significant force in Argentine politics beginning in the 1930s. Nacionalismo was typically centred upon the support of order, hierarchy, a corporative society, militant Catholicism, and the landed estates (latifundia), combined with the hatred of liberalism, leftism, Freemasonry, feminism, Jews and foreigners. It denounced liberalism and democracy as the prelude to communism. The movement was also irredentist, declaring intentions to annex Uruguay, Paraguay, Chile and some southern and eastern parts of Bolivia and even the British-held territory of the Falkland Islands (Islas Malvinas) and its dependencies.

Nacionalismo was strongly influenced by Maurassisme and Spanish clericalism as well as by Italian fascism and Nazism. After the 1930 Argentine coup d'etat, Nacionalistas firmly supported the entrenchment of an authoritarian corporatist state led by a military leader. Nacionalistas often refused to participate in elections because of their opposition to elections as a derivative of liberalism. Its advocates were writers, journalists, a few politicians, colonels, and other junior military officers; the latter supported the Nationalists largely because, for most of their existence, they saw in the military the only potential political saviour of the country.

== Ideology ==
Nacionalismo supported a "return to tradition, to the past, to sentiments authentically Argentine, ... [to] the reintegration of the nation with these essential values"; these essential values included Roman Catholicism, claiming that to the Church "the Nation should be linked as the body to the soul". Nacionalismo opposed secular education, accusing it of being "Masonic laicism", and supported clerical control of education.

Nacionalismo based its twin policy of opposition to liberalism and socialism, which it combined with its promotion of social justice, on the papal encyclicals of 1891 (Rerum novarum) and 1931 (Quadragesimo anno). Nacionalismo supported improving relations between the social classes to achieve the Catholic ideal of an organic, "harmonious" society.

=== History of ideology ===
If the nationalists had reached the 1930 coup without a defined ideology, throughout the 1930s they formalized their ideas and their programme for political action and government. They adopted corporatism, reaffirmed the reasons for their contempt for party politics and democracy, and shaped the other concepts that defined their thought.

All these groups exalted youth, energy and masculinity; the role of women in the society they aspired to create was highly subordinate, limited to keeping the home and family functioning. They were, almost without exception, fanatical Catholics, who aspired to a strong government elected by the corporations and attacked Congress. Their proposals supported a certain degree of statism, upheld corporatism and proclaimed a return to the traditions that preceded the liberal triumph, which they placed in the mid-19th century. Unlike almost all previous generations since Independence, they claimed Spain as a source of civilization and opposed the dogma of indefinite progress based on scientism.

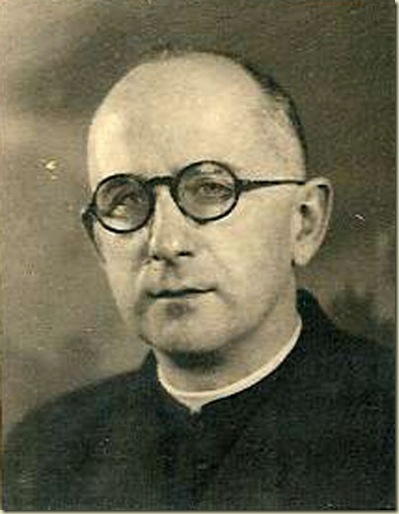
Julio Meinvielle.

With regard to their Catholicism, it was inevitable: the 1930s were a period in which the Catholic Church was at its height, and believed it had restored the "Catholic nation", leaving behind the atheism and agnosticism that in previous decades had been reflected both in most conservative leaders and in almost the whole of radicalism. In practice, that identification was not always sincere and was used only as a resource in support of traditions prior to liberal constitutionalism. And it was not even well received by the Catholic authorities and organizations themselves: Argentine Catholic Action rejected the magazine Crisol's belonging to Catholicism, declaring that Catholicism was incompatible with Nazism.

Nationalism advocated a "return to tradition, to the past, to authentically Argentine feelings, ... to the reintegration of the nation with these essential values". These essential values included Roman Catholicism, affirming that the Church and "the Nation must be united as the body to the soul". Nationalism opposed secular education, accusing it of being Masonic laicism, and supported clerical control of education. It based its twin policy of opposition to liberalism and socialism, together with the promotion of social justice, on the papal encyclicals of 1891 (Rerum novarum) and 1931 (Quadragesimo anno). Nationalism supported improving relations between social classes in order to achieve the Catholic ideal of an organic and "harmonious" society.

One of the most widespread topics among these groups was anticommunism: while in the previous decade it had not received attention because it was considered harmless to the Argentine state, during the 1930s warnings abounded about the imminence of a communist revolution; communists were discovered everywhere, and anything that was not openly corporatist had to be considered a possible path to communism.

One of the points on which the different nationalisms clashed was the interpretation of minorities and leaders: while some of the most prominent groups advocated the need to submit to the leadership of absolute, patriotic and strong chiefs, or to be guided by a tiny minority of determined men, others sought to found mass movements, capable of winning through numerical superiority. If it were necessary to participate in elections, the latter considered themselves better prepared after extending the movement to the masses. The former, by contrast, needed to justify their position by clarifying that they intended to seize power, but by no means through electoral means.

The vast majority of these movements advocated an interventionist state, capable of regulating and directing economic activity in order to secure the rights and subsistence of those who had the least; the general situation of the country during the 1930s, amid a great advance of poverty and unemployment, forced them to define how they would solve it. In any case, beyond strong interventionism, at no point did they think of questioning the "natural" right to private property, more because of a reflex conditioned by the desire to appear in positions opposed to the left than out of conviction. What they questioned was "illegitimate capital", that is, any activity that made profits without producing anything or contributing to the growth of society. They also opposed the country's dependence on British capital.

=== Right-wing and left-wing Nacionalismo ===
Authors such as Rosa de Diego and Rafael Cuevas Molina distinguish within nationalism two major ideological currents: the first seeks to strengthen national self-determination against colonial, imperialist or neocolonial powers, a current that has been characterized as "liberating nationalism", or "anti-imperialist nationalism" while the second seeks to promote the supremacy of one nation over others, described by Memmi as "the nationalism of the colonizer", and characterized by Rosa de Diego as "exclusionary and dominating nationalism". Other thinkers argue that there is no difference or contradiction between these two strands, but rather that they are different manifestations of the same impulse underlying all nationalism: the reaffirmation of one's own cultural values and their imposition over others. This impulse may appear as "independence-oriented" or "imperialist" depending on external circumstances such as geopolitical balance of power, rather than distinct ideological premises. Thus, in the words of Fernando Savater:

the myth of the Nation is aggressive in its very essence and has no real meaning other than war mobilization. If there were no enemies, there would be no homelands; it remains to be seen whether there would be enemies if there were no homelands… The nation asserts and constitutes itself in opposition to others: its identity arises from rebellion against or conquest of the neighbor. A good example of this is the paranoid mechanism of patriotic self-affirmation, which leads to the invention of an Anti-Homeland as the limit and definition of each homeland. The first and fundamental anti-homeland is the foreigner, the hostile barbarian; by extension, anyone within the community who dissents from the established identity and objects through their conduct or ideas to the model of the perfect national individual

— Fernando Savater,

Aside from this idea, and regardless of the validity attributed to situations of domination or dependence between different states, a distinction is often made between left-wing nationalism or "popular" nationalism, which, rather than being based on the traditional family and its rights, is grounded in philosophical concepts shared with sectors of the political left, such as social justice, popular sovereignty and national self-determination (both political and economic). By contrast, right-wing nationalism is understood as one that especially favors the nuclear family and its rights, as it sees the family as the primary means of promoting the nation and the processes it undergoes. From the perspective of conservative nationalists, the family is the structure that connects past events to promote a better future. This form of nationalism defends traditional social values and promotes social stability. According to Austrian political scientist Sieglinde Rosenberger, "national conservatism praises the family as the home and center of identity, solidarity and emotion". In some cases, it seeks to exclude dissenters from national identity, rejecting multiculturalism and immigration as threats to the identity it aims to preserve. Historically, it has often embraced strong anti-communism, opposing left-wing movements and labeling their ideas as "foreign".

Between the late 19th and early 20th centuries, right-wing nationalism came to oppose democracy and equality, as well as the value of diversity. Among the forms of equality it rejected was universal, equal, and secret suffrage, proposing instead corporative representation as a decision-making system. This implied a shift toward a capitalist mode of production of a corporatist type, based on the creation of corporations inspired by the guilds of pre-industrial societies, in which employers and workers would be integrated to achieve "social harmony" (in contrast to the class struggle of Marxism). "Corporatism sought to implement new mechanisms of regulation of labour relations that would eliminate the uncertainty and conflict inherent to the liberal model, while leaving intact the core of capitalist social relations, particularly property rights and the subordination of labor to capital". Corporatism reached its peak during the interwar period when Catholic corporatism was joined by "authoritarian corporatism", exemplified by the corporatism of Mussolini's Italy (and the guild-inspired ideas of Émile Durkheim) and applied in several non-democratic European countries such as Portugal, Austria, Germany, and Spain (the National Corporate Organization of the Dictatorship of Primo de Rivera and the later Organization Syndicate of the Franco dictatorship).

After World War II, corporatism became completely discredited due to its association with defeated fascisms.

==== Right-wing Nacionalismo ====
In Argentina, right-wing nationalism emerged in the 19th and early 20th centuries. From the beginning it was formed by upper and middle classes, associated with the National Autonomist Party and subsequent conservative parties. Most held ideologies closer to conservatism than liberalism, and were largely practicing Catholics. This conservative connection led them to regard Spain as a model, while partly dismissing Great Britain and France, which were preferred by most liberals. Historian Federico Finchelstein, who attempted to establish a direct link between 19th-century right-wing nationalism and the 1976–1983 military regime, proposed the idea of a long-standing tradition among Argentine conservatives of using violence as a primary form of political action. He cites as precedents the invasion of interior provinces after the Battle of Pavón, the War of the Triple Alliance and the Conquest of the Desert carried out under the governments of Nicolás Avellaneda and Julio Argentino Roca. According to Finchelstein, the latter allowed members of the Generation of '80 to openly display racism and a will to exterminate their enemies.

Beyond this interpretation, nationalist currents from the 1920s onward were not composed exclusively of privileged classes, but mainly of middle-class members. These groups also showed imitation tendencies, seeking to replicate the style and ideology of European anti-democratic right-wing movements: initially the dictatorship of Miguel Primo de Rivera in Spain, and later Italian fascism, with some cases extending to Nazism. In particular, from the 1920s to the 1950s, it became an ideology that imitated nationalism in other nations. Among intellectuals, there was clear influence from nationalist and conservative Catholic thinkers such as Juan Donoso Cortés, Marcelino Menéndez Pelayo, Joseph de Maistre, Maurice Barrès and Charles Maurras, whose ideas were frequently reproduced in Argentine nationalist publications such as La Nueva República, La Fronda and Cabildo.

The three defining features of Argentine nationalism are traditionalism—a commitment to an idealized past—certain populist tendencies, and a recurring use of street mobilization and violence. Antisemitism and voluntary identification with the Catholic Church in Argentina were common components among most right-wing nationalist groups, though not all. Among Catholic nationalist leaders, Manuel Gálvez stood out.

Nevertheless, nationalist groups failed to establish a formally uniform ideology to offer society. Perhaps their most enduring contribution to Argentine intellectual life was fostering the emergence of historical revisionism, a movement that challenged the historical dogmas established by the liberal elite over decades.

== History ==
=== Beginnings ===
During Yrigoyen's first government, conservatives interpreted it as a passing phenomenon. The Alvear government and the split between Yrigoyenism and antipersonalism seemed to prove them right: the Radicals most opposed to the former president came to power. But when he was elected again in 1928, many liberals and conservatives moved to the corporate and antidemocratic far right. They devoted themselves to attacking democracy and the existence of "professional politicians", who had no private economic activity but lived from public office, something that existed in all parties.

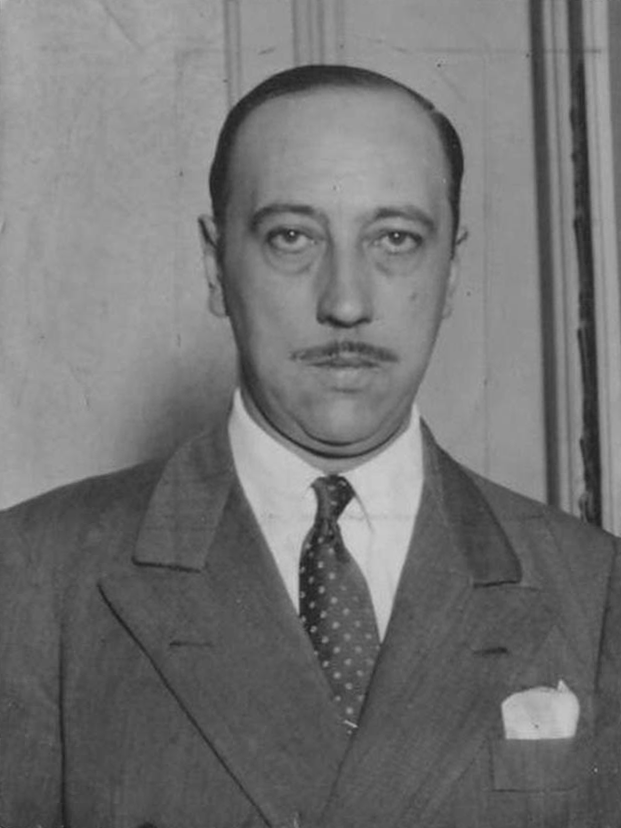
Ernesto Palacio, editor-in-chief of La Nueva República.

At the end of 1927 the newspaper La Nueva República was founded. At first it aimed to publicize various currents of thought, but a year later it became the first official organ of right-wing nationalism, and the most prominent medium devoted to permanent attacks on the government. Its first director was Rodolfo Irazusta, assisted by Ernesto Palacio, and among its contributors and directors were Julio Irazusta, Juan Carulla, Mario Lassaga, César Pico and Tomás Casares. All of them were militant and very active Catholics.

The ideas of La Nueva República were vague and general. For example, they accepted liberalism as positive as it had been applied until 1916, and rejected it outright in its forms since 1916, blaming it for the development of democracy. They also condemned the authoritarian turns that Yrigoyen's government sometimes took because it applied them by attracting the masses, rather than imposing itself on them by force. The only one who attempted to give them an organic form was Ernesto Palacio, who made the whole of social organization revolve around order, hierarchy and authority; his objective was not the people, but the "intelligent minority", and he reserved for the people the function of following what that minority imposed on them. These ideas were not entirely original, but rather derived from Action française and Charles Maurras.

The newspaper insisted that the country was going through a crisis, for which the Radicals were responsible, because of their demagogy, the supposed looting of the state that they denounced, and the discouragement of work that they attributed to the enactment of labour laws. They proposed replacing electoral representation with some form of recognition of "ability", "respect for superiors" in culture, social position and age; and considered democracy a utopia, a beautiful general concept but inapplicable. According to Irazusta, the principles of equality and freedom made all organization impossible, and it was necessary to replace them with principles of authority and ability. Palacio, for his part, called for the beginning of an intellectual counterrevolution as a preface to the political restoration of the principles of order and hierarchies. From their point of view, democracy and liberalism inevitably led to socialism, chaos or foreign domination. In fact, they considered radicalism to be the movement that would lead Argentina to socialism; on this point they had to face the opposition of Manuel Gálvez, who thought that Yrigoyen's labour policies were an effective brake against the advance of the true left. In electoral terms, La Nueva República proposed voting for conservative parties as the lesser evil, while waiting for the appearance of an organized and competitive nationalist party.

In 1929, several of the directors of La Nueva República founded the Republican League, with the idea of becoming strong enough to participate in national elections. Their first activities were aimed at provoking disturbances at public events, although they only managed to attract attention and be arrested for a few hours each time, far from the immense brawls they aspired to cause.

Meinvielle's preaching in the magazine Criterio was not limited to nationalism, Catholicism and political integralism: under the influence of his agile writing, both the magazine and the circle of intellectuals who published there turned toward the most determined antisemitism.

=== The 1930 coup ===
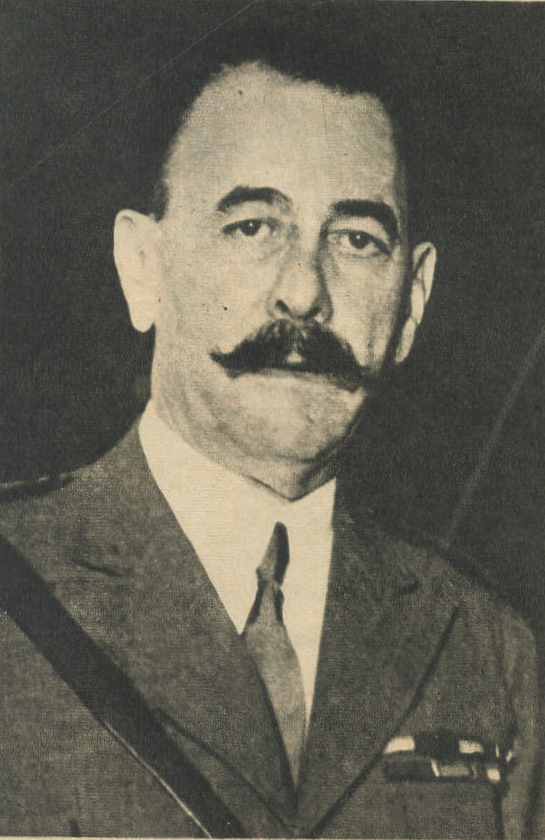
José Félix Uriburu.

After a long political crisis that wore down Yrigoyen's government, on 6 September 1930 the nationalist general José Félix Uriburu marched on the centre of the city of Buenos Aires and occupied the Casa Rosada, declaring himself president of the Nation. The dictator believed that the success of the coup d'état demonstrated the strength of nationalism in Argentina; however, the coup had been supported by old and new conservatives, and by practically the whole political spectrum outside Yrigoyenism.

Inspired by the experiences of the Spanish dictatorship and by the fascism of Benito Mussolini, Uriburu intended to organize the country with a corporate system. Only after the dictator announced it did the nationalists adopt corporatism as part of their ideology.

However, Uriburu did not fully coincide with nationalist thought, nor did he feel himself to be exclusively the representative of that sector. He had participated in the Revolution of the Park in 1890; in 1914 he had been part of the founding nucleus of the Progressive Democratic Party, and that same year had been a candidate for deputy for the National Civic Union in the city of Buenos Aires, obtaining 13,673 votes and coming in 19th place, so he was not elected. Belonging to a traditional family with extensive social connections, he was friends with leaders of all parties. Many conservatives had supported him, so he called almost exclusively old officials from the governments before 1916, almost all conservatives, to occupy the top posts in his government. The only one of his ministers who was openly nationalist and antidemocratic was the minister of the interior, Matías Sánchez Sorondo, who supported Uriburu in speeches every time he announced his corporate programme. Meeting resistance from the conservatives in his government, Uriburu ended up proclaiming that he had not come to impose the corporatist formula, but that his role was to propose it, so that the new Congress, whose election he would preside over, would decide whether to make the necessary changes.

The first step in Uriburu's plans was to politically proscribe Yrigoyen. He then officialized the Argentine Civic Legion - a shock group in a classically fascist style - with the intention of turning it into his personal guard and shock force. The Legion declared itself composed of "patriotic men" who embodied "the spirit of the September revolution and who were morally and materially prepared to cooperate in the institutional reconstruction of the country". The Legion was the largest nationalist organization in Argentina in the early 1930s. The Legion's first actions were aimed at publicly expressing patriotic feeling, so they took part in events and parades carrying flags and singing nationalist songs. A Women's Group was created within the Legion, headed by Josefina Meyer de Lavalle, Adela Gramajo de Patrón Costas and Magdalena Bustamante de Paz Anchorena. This group was constituted as a true charitable society, assisting and educating needy families. The Children's Civic Legion was also created; on 29 May 1931 it was recognized by the National Council of Education as an "Institution for civic and patriotic culture of an apolitical character", which authorized it to "occupy, when requested, the premises of schools and physical exercise squares" under that Council.

Several months after the coup, Uriburu announced the tool with which he intended to develop a corporate economic system: the union of all parties through the creation of a National Party, which the other parties would have to join, although Yrigoyenist radicalism and possibly the Socialist Party would be excluded. The invitation was rejected by all except some conservative groups. Before failing, Uriburu had hastened to call elections for governor of Buenos Aires, confident that he would present a single National Party candidacy against the Radicals; when the founding of that party did not materialize, he could not backtrack. Radicalism presented the Pueyrredón-Guido ticket, while conservatism lined up behind the Santamarina-Pereda ticket of the "moderate" Democratic Party of Buenos Aires. The also electorally weakened Socialist Party presented the Repetto-Bronzini ticket. Radicalism could not carry out any electoral campaign and most of its leaders were in exile, so the government considered that the UCR was "outside history". This was not the case: the winner was Honorio Pueyrredón, the radical candidate. Immediately, and under pressure from the other political parties, Uriburu declared the results null, on the grounds that the people "had not learned to vote". On 8 May Uriburu suspended the call to the provincial electoral college, and appointed Manuel Ramón Alvarado de facto governor of Buenos Aires Province.

In these elections, the nationalists lined up behind General Agustín Pedro Justo: they hoped that he would exercise a government of order that would allow them, at some point, to try the corporate adventure again. But that was not the case. Justo was soon seen as a representative of conservative political groups and of the conservative factions of radicalism and socialism. The legacy that Uriburu would have liked to leave - a corporate political system - remained only in the dictator's plans and speeches; on the very day of his successor's inauguration, he handed him a draft of a new corporate constitution, a project that Justo never promoted.

=== The 1930s ===
Beginning in the mid-1930s, Nacionalistas declared their concern for the working classes and support for social reform, with the newspaper La Voz Nacionalista declaring "The lack of equity, of welfare, of social justice, of humanity, has made the proletariat a beast of burden ... unable to enjoy life or the advances of civilization". By the late 1930s, with industrial development increasing in the country, Nacionalistas promoted a policy of progressive income redistribution to allow more money to remain with wage-earners, thus allowing them to invest in and widen the economy, and increase industrial growth.

During the 1930s there were no fewer than forty active right-wing nationalist groups, ranging from very complex organizations to almost powerless small groups. Among them the Argentine Civic Legion, Argentine Nationalist Action, Affirmation of a New Argentina and the Alliance of Nationalist Youth stood out. Much of the leadership of the traditional political parties also began to speak in favour of building an economic, political and sociocultural model similar to the one that the leaders of the Old Continent had created or were creating. In the Senate, the former minister Matías Sánchez Sorondo, like the governor of Buenos Aires Manuel Fresco, both belonging to the National Democratic Party, publicly praised Benito Mussolini, Adolf Hitler and Francisco Franco. At the request of the German Embassy in Argentina, Sánchez Sorondo founded the Commission for Intellectual Cooperation with the Axis in 1936, together with Gustavo Martínez Zuviría, Ricardo Levene, Carlos Ibarguren, the Nobel Prize winner in Biology Bernardo Houssay, the dean of the UBA Law Faculty Juan P. Ramos and Mariano Castex, among others. In that capacity he was invited in 1937 to travel to Spain, Italy and Germany, and held a series of interviews with nationalist figures, including one with Hitler himself. Fresco, for his part, decorated his governor's office with busts of Hitler and Mussolini, and declared the Communist Party illegal throughout the province. Shortly afterwards he proclaimed that his government was guided by the teachings of the Catholic Church through the encyclical Rerum Novarum. In line with that idea, he promoted the construction of low-cost housing for workers and sought to force employers to pay better wages and a family wage. By contrast, the governor of Buenos Aires Federico Martínez de Hoz appointed ministers of that tendency - without identifying himself with it - and used nationalist rhetoric during some speeches as a means of broadening his support, at least during the crisis that would lead to his removal.

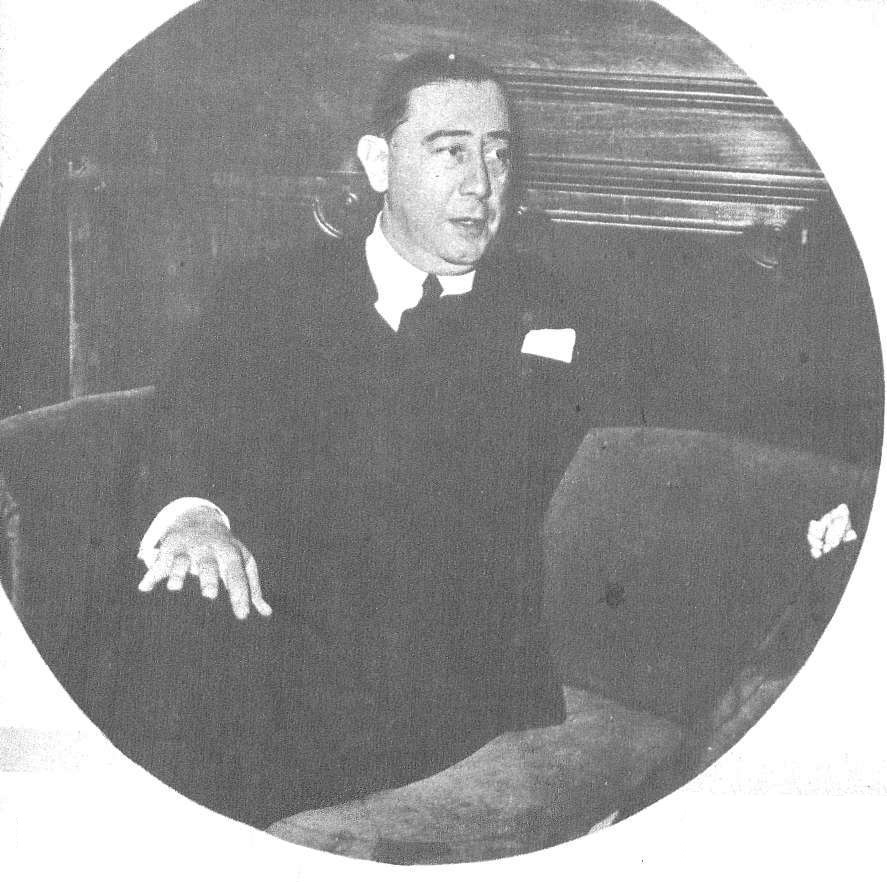
Fresco in 1939. Caras y Caretas magazine.

The Civic Legion, officialized and directed as a shock force by the dictator Uriburu himself, was initially led by Lieutenant Colonels Emilio Kinkelín and Juan Bautista Molina, who trained its members for urban guerrilla warfare and violent mobilizations. Its objectives were to create a corporatist state, give property to workers, limit immigration and prohibit those not born in the country from access to any public office. It also intended to destroy communism and dissolve all political parties.

In 1932, Juan P. Ramos, Floro Lavalle and Alberto Uriburu split from the Civic Legion to found Nationalist Action, a sincere attempt to unify the different nationalist currents. Ramos was named "Chief of Argentine Nationalism", but the title did not produce the desired unity. Some time later, after incorporating a few tiny groups, it was renamed Aduna, for Afirmación de una Nueva Argentina, and came to have 15,000 militants in 1936. But four years later, its membership had collapsed and it did not even have a stable address where it could meet.

In August 1933 a second attempt was made to unite the nationalists in the Argentine Guard group, which had in its favour the fame that preceded its president, Leopoldo Lugones. However, it was precisely Lugones, unable to yield anything to the other leaders, who first drove away the Civic Legion and quickly caused the Guard's collapse into complete irrelevance, less than a year after it was founded.

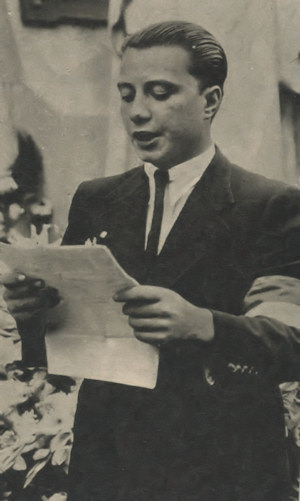
Juan Queraltó in 1935

Differences between these groups prevented them from uniting, and their long-term objectives were very different in each case: while Irazusta, a member of the Salta oligarchy, hoped for a triumph of corporatism that would exclude the middle and lower classes from political decisions, Gálvez hoped to organize a government of order, but one that was popular and centred on the inland provinces. Only in Córdoba did all the currents come together in a single group, the Front of Fascist Forces of Córdoba, chaired by Nimio de Anquín. Despite this lack of unity, there was a new attempt at a nationalist and corporatist military coup when, at an ultra-right-wing demonstration in 1935, the leader of the Civic Legion, General Juan B. Molina, demanded the dissolution of the three branches of the national government, the abolition of political parties, the establishment of a military dictatorship, the promulgation of press censorship, actions to prevent immorality and a change in the economic system, which would be directed by an "advisory board" uniting the representation of employers and workers. Shortly after this, and despite those public statements, Justo's government entrusted Molina in 1936 with the Non-Commissioned Officers' School at Campo de Mayo. There, from the outset, he set about planning, together with Dr Diego Luis Molinari, a former Yrigoyenist now close to corporatist ideas, a revolution that was to break out that same year during the 9 July parades.

In 1937, Juan Queraltó, leader of the National Union of Secondary School Students, split from the Civic Legion and founded the Alliance of Nationalist Youth. Its militants included Ramón Doll, Jordán Bruno Genta, Bonifacio Lastra and Colonel Natalio Mascarello, and they ended up symbolically designating General Molina as their "Supreme Chief".

Of very different origin, the Argentine National Union-Homeland was founded by the governor of Buenos Aires, Manuel Fresco. Meanwhile, the Irazusta brothers and Ernesto Palacio continued to found newspapers, such as Nuevo Orden and La Voz del Plata. Carulla, by then separated from them, founded Bandera Argentina, from which he openly advocated a corporatist dictatorship.

The newspapers Crisol and Pampero were openly Nazi, and their income was covered by the German embassy. There were also several other newspapers, such as Choque, Nueva Política, Clarinada, Nuevo Orden, Renovación, Momento Argentino and Frente Argentino. It was suspected that several of these were subsidized by the Nazi regime, but it is difficult to establish which ones and with what amounts.

==== Violence ====
One of the elements that most clearly identified these separate groups as a homogeneous whole was the continual recourse to violence. And they were not limited to fistfights with radical or socialist demonstrators; they perpetrated an endless list of attacks on premises, institutions, newspapers, trade union headquarters, and so on. Nor did they stop short of murder, including a failed attempt against the socialist leader Alfredo Palacios, the murder of Córdoba provincial deputy José Guevara and the shooting at radicals during the 25 May 1935 event.

They theorized about practically everything, so they also theorized about violence:

Violence is the pleasure of the gods. A well-placed blow is more persuasive than a lecture, but there remains the recourse - in case someone objects to us in the name of tottering intellectualist liberalism - of giving lectures interspersed with blows.

— Bandera Argentina, 1 August 1932.

But despite this heated theoretical defence, it should be observed that - unlike European fascism - their violence was in reality a kind of hobby, a sport or pose. They attacked their enemies because that was part of the fascist menu, but their objective was never the elimination of the adversary as a group.

The Alliance of Nationalist Youth was a good example of this form of politics: every day, well-organized groups of young men left its headquarters on Corrientes Street and went directly to attack some target: a Communist Party office, a radical committee, a synagogue, or a company with British capital, for example. And they usually returned with a few fewer, wounded, bloodied or in splints, recounting their adventures against hordes of bolches, always more numerous than themselves. The rest usually remained in police stations, where a few hours later they were leniently released. This activity became much more relevant for this group - and for several others - than long and high-sounding speeches.

==== Antisemitism ====
Nationalist groups claimed to be the defenders of authentic Argentina, a homogeneous country in which dissent had no place. From that point of view, and also from the "myth of the Catholic Nation", Jews went from being "one of several problems" in the country to being "the central problem": without clear evidence to support it, they blamed Jews for every crisis, for every obstacle to the country's progress. They copied attacks on Jews that were spreading more and more in Europe - and not only in Germany. They enthusiastically supported the myth of the world Jewish conspiracy, and devoted themselves to attacking Jewish synagogues. They even demanded that the government of San Juan Province withdraw the submission by which a candidate of Jewish origin had been proposed as criminal prosecutor; astonishingly, the San Juan government withdrew the submission, yielding to pressure from a group solely because of the violence it was capable of exercising.

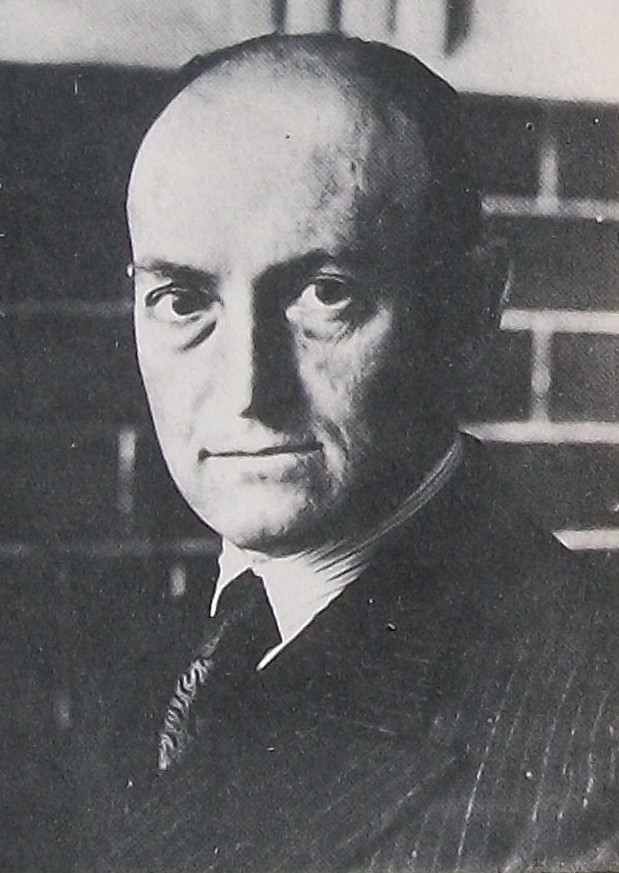
Gustavo Martínez Zuviría, antisemitic writer and essayist, better known as Hugo Wast.

Antisemitic pamphlets and posters flooded the cities, and the newspaper Crisol insisted in each of its issues that "the Jewish problem" had to be solved. Coming from a newspaper publicly supported by the government of Hitler, its threats should have been taken seriously. Two other newspapers that flaunted their hatred of Jews were Clarinada and La Maroma, the latter devoted to indoctrinating the working classes and, curiously, attacking not communism but exclusively British capital. Extremes were reached such as the newspaper Frente Argentino, which openly maintained that killing Jews was not a crime, or the formation of an Argentine Anti-Jewish Alliance. The most notable nationalist organization of the time, the AJN, also moved toward an increasingly clear antisemitic ideology.

Antisemitic ideas also had wide diffusion in the Catholic Church, through the priest Meinvielle or the bishop Gustavo Franceschi. Among intellectuals, Gustavo Martínez Zuviría had great success with his antisemitic novels, and the pamphlet The Protocols of the Elders of Zion was widely disseminated in Argentina. However, that attitude was not exclusive to Argentina: beyond Nazi Germany, antisemitism was making very visible advances in a great number of countries, such as in the "white" countries of the Commonwealth, in France and also in the Soviet Union.

In any case, Argentine nationalists were initially not antisemitic for racial reasons, but because they were convinced that Jews were behind Freemasonry and communism; by attacking Jews, the "Catholic Nation" was being defended from communism. One of the bases of antisemitism was the increase in the Jewish population during that period: fleeing persecution in Europe, it grew from 218,000 to 378,000 inhabitants between 1930 and 1949, a growth of 78%, while the total population increased by 48%; this only meant reaching 2.2% of the total population, but the percentage was much higher in the city of Buenos Aires. Only in the mid-1930s did racial antisemitism emerge strongly, hatred of Jews simply because they were Jews; the magazine Clarinada was its greatest example.

==== Nationalism and the Catholic Church ====
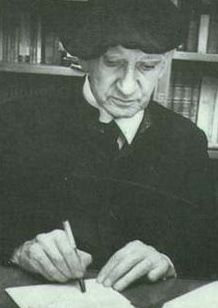
The priest Leonardo Castellani.

In an October 1932 editorial in the magazine Criterio, which he directed, Monsignor Gustavo Franceschi opined that the "nationalist awakening" constituted the hope of the country, and was a patriotic response to communist hope. However, he was concerned by the movement's insistence on imitating foreign models.

In a certain sense, Franceschi was a continuator of the anti-liberal Catholicism that had emerged as a response to the secularism of the Generation of '80 and to the elimination of the Church's civil functions. He had never felt any sympathy for equality and democracy, but - after about three decades of mutual acceptance - by around 1930 he had been moving against democracy and its consequences. Toward the end of 1931, a collective pastoral letter from the Argentine bishops advised its readers whom, why and how to vote for. In the absence of the Radicals, it attacked the Democratic Progressives and the Socialists.

The main tool of the anti-liberal clergy was Catholic Action, founded in 1928 and theoretically devoted only to spiritual activities. Nevertheless, it had its own indoctrination scheme, the Catholic Culture Courses, directed by Tomás Casares and Atilio Dell'Oro Maini, and where Leonardo Castellani and César E. Pico, prominent nationalist leaders, taught. The latter even indulged in publicly contradicting Jacques Maritain, who opposed Catholic support for totalitarian regimes; Pico also justified the use of violence. For his part, Meinvielle obsessively found Jews behind each of humanity's calamities, that is, behind Protestantism, the French Revolution and communism; in fact, he blamed Jews for class conflicts that, were it not for them, would not exist. Almost all of them, and with them Monsignor Franceschi, supported as an ideal model to follow Spanish Falangism, a totalitarian and antidemocratic movement of Catholic inspiration.

Several young Catholic groups came to see the risk of supporting these extremist nationalists, whom they thought could only become external supporters of Nazism. They warned the public against supporting antisemitism and the use of violence, but their appeals to the episcopate were completely ignored: part of the clerical leadership felt very comfortable with the support of the nationalists, which confirmed its claim to gather the entire Argentine people within the Church.

Until the 1937 elections, the Church visibly cooperated with the governments of the Infamous Decade. But its support had been as notable and visible as its anxiety to advance over the whole of society: when the new president Roberto M. Ortiz attacked fraudulent practices and annulled elections, the Church adhered to nationalist and anticommunist postulates. The creation of the Catholic Culture Courses was an important link between the Church and the nationalists. Many Catholic leaders advocated a strong and very undemocratic government, taking António de Oliveira Salazar in Portugal or Engelbert Dollfuss in Austria as examples.

As might be expected, nationalists and Catholics converged again in support of the Nationalist faction during the Spanish Civil War. The shift of support from the main currents of Catholicism toward the nationalist side was answered by a similar realignment of nationalism in favour of the Catholic Church. In fact, these movements had begun some time earlier, when the National Eucharistic Congress aroused everyone's envy because of its enormous ability to summon crowds and its staging, more suitable for a fascist or Falangist parade than for a mass. Nationalists became fanatical supporters of the ideas of Ramiro de Maeztu, who proposed a Catholic renaissance for all Spain and Hispanic America, as well as upholding the principle, as resonant as it was vague, of Hispanidad. Among those who joined this idea of a return to a unity of Hispanidad were Pico, Sánchez Sorondo, Nimio de Anquín and the historian Rómulo D. Carbia.

At the beginning of the Second World War, most nationalist groups had already abandoned Mussolini's fascism, and were now almost unanimously inspired by Spanish Falangism.

==== Fascism and Nazism in Argentina ====
Many Italian immigrants in Argentina and their children identified more with Italy than with their destination country; and some of them supported the fascist government of Benito Mussolini. This government financed the activities of fascist representatives in Argentina, especially the businessman Vittorio Valdani, who organized meetings with all the fascist staging and published the newspaper Il Mattino d'Italia, which circulated between 1930 and 1943. The main fascist organization was the Opera Nazionale Dopolavoro, a political-cultural device designed to offer activities after work: sports, outings, dances, cinema, reading, whatever was useful for indoctrinating Italian emigrants. And, of course, when there were enough people, parades of blackshirts.

The National Fascist Party had existed in Argentina since May 1923; but it had no internal activity, and its only role was to support Italian fascism from overseas. By 1927, it had branches in no fewer than eight cities in addition to the capital, more than five thousand members, and the foundation of a fascist colony was even authorized. In 1932 the Argentine Fascist Party was added, whose Córdoba branch, led by Nimio de Anquín, became especially known when it was accused of the murder of provincial deputy José Guevara during a public event. The two fascist parties were at odds with each other: they fought over who was the more loyal follower of the Duce and came to blows in the street.

The main local fascist newspaper was Bandera Argentina, edited by Juan E. Carulla, which published Mussolini's speeches and articles from Italy's official newspapers. And frequently also quotations from Mein Kampf, Hitler's speeches and news from Nazi Germany; according to Carulla, those pieces were paid for by the German community in Argentina, and neither he nor his newspaper were Nazis. While repeatedly mentioning "the Slavic-Semitic plague", and speaking more openly than any other medium against democracy and the Constitution, Carulla himself declared that through those articles he managed to get the embassy and some German companies to subsidize the newspaper, which was always in need of money. The case of Enrique Osés's El Pampero was completely different: the newspaper was maintained only by subsidies from the embassy and German companies, and was devoted exclusively to spreading their ideas.

Curiously, they took great care not to criticize President Justo: not only because he held the means of repression in his hands, but because he was a military man, and they respected military men even with their "democratic deviations". Some historians accuse right-wing nationalists of not even having found anything objectionable in the Roca-Runciman Treaty. Others, by contrast, hold the opposite view:

Research on Argentine nationalism has considered the work La Argentina y el imperialismo británico, by the Irazusta brothers, a milestone in the development of both historical revisionism and anti-imperialism (...), centred on denouncing the Roca-Runciman Treaty, an instrument of British imperialism and, in the authors' opinion, a factor in the country's economic dependence and political inferiority.

In support of fascist aspirations to repeat Italy's success on the other side of the sea, the playwright Luigi Pirandello and the Mexican José Vasconcelos, who made a passionate defence of fascism, visited Buenos Aires. Another opportunity to exalt fascism came with the funeral rites of the former rector of the University of Buenos Aires, Ángel Gallardo, a recognized admirer of Mussolini's movement.

The street parades of the two fascist parties and of the Opera Nazionale Dopolavoro were very common, and the celebrations of Italian victories in Ethiopia were an ideal opportunity for them. In some cases up to fifty thousand spectators gathered.

=== Transformations and changes ===
Revolving around right-wing nationalist leaders, there was a long list of intellectuals who sought solutions in nationalism but were not willing to join fascist or pro-fascist groups. Among them, Saúl Taborda sought a definition of nationalism that would not be incompatible with formal democracy, without ever managing to find one. Macedonio Fernández, a seeker of the national being, drifted toward metaphysics. Manuel Ugarte, of socialist origin, was a fervent anti-imperialist; although he never actively militated in nationalist groups, he went through a period of rapprochement with them before ultimately distancing himself. He remained loyal to neutrality until the end and became part of Peronism.

==== Historical revisionism ====
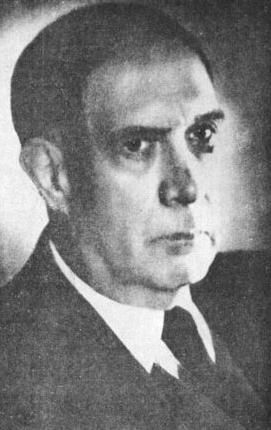
Manuel Gálvez, writer, historian, and nationalist activist.

The vast majority of the ideas of Argentine nationalists were imported from Europe. However, one activity in particular, removed from executive politics—historiography—made it possible to create a set of new ideas and concepts, identified with what has come to be called historical revisionism. The triumph of the liberals over the federalists in the battles of Caseros and Pavón had been so complete that the victorious generation identified the leading federalist figures as the sum of all evils, particularly José Artigas, Facundo Quiroga, and—above all—Juan Manuel de Rosas, without any opposition. Revisionist historians first rehabilitated Rosas, a symbol of defensive nationalism, of resistance to pressure from the great European powers and of the late Spanish tradition, who had also been a strong, authoritarian, and only formally democratic ruler: it would be difficult to find a more fitting description both for Rosas and for the leader the nationalists had been seeking.

Originally, revisionism had arisen in search of answers to historical questions that could not be explained at all by the formulas of Bartolomé Mitre and his followers. The first works in this direction—those of Adolfo Saldías, Ernesto Quesada, and Juan Álvarez—were devoted to understanding what could not be understood within the simplistic framework imposed by Mitre. Only with the emergence of nationalism did a convergence occur between it and revisionism, through the works of Carlos Ibarguren and the Irazusta brothers, right-wing nationalists easily identifiable with fascism or Falangism. This same convergence led to a new division within nationalism, with figures such as Rómulo Carbia, Manuel Gálvez, and José María Rosa separating from right-wing nationalist ranks, all of them through their historiographical work.

This historiographical work and historical interpretation led to the development of the concept of dependency and dependency theory instead of imitation of European right-wing nationalist models. At the same time, they vindicated not only Rosas but also Quiroga, Estanislao López, Artigas, and many other federalist leaders.

It was also these defensive nationalists who, through José Luis Torres, disseminated and generalized the term Infamous Decade for the liberal, anti-democratic, and dependent restoration they were experiencing. The development of the concept of dependency brought them closer to another group of completely different origin.

==== Convergences from outside: national thought in FORJA ====
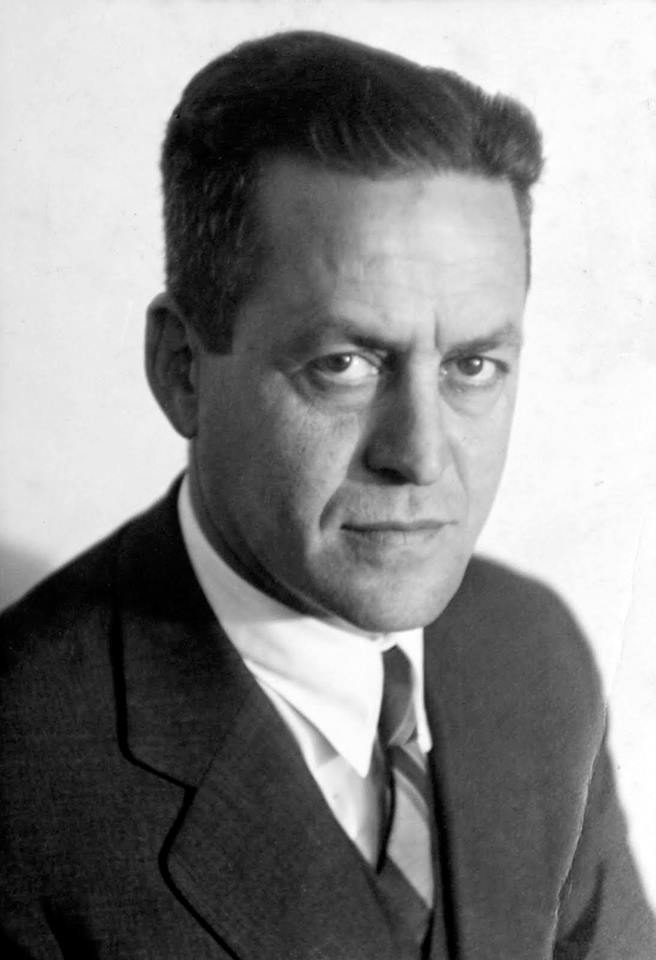
Raúl Scalabrini Ortiz.

Initially formed as a youth organization within the UCR, the Fuerza de Orientación Radical de la Joven Argentina (FORJA) was not a right-wing nationalist organization, nor was it left-wing, as it has sometimes been labeled. Developing autonomously from the radicalism led by Alvear, they increasingly distanced themselves from the UCR leadership, eventually being expelled from it. Meanwhile, they developed their own theory of dependency and skillfully investigated and disseminated the historical causes of that dependency, mainly through the brilliant writings of Raúl Scalabrini Ortiz and Arturo Jauretche, but also of other activists such as Homero Manzi, Gabriel del Mazo, Luis Dellepiane, Héctor Maya, and Atilio García Mellid. Ultimately, by an autonomous path distinct from the branching trunk of right-wing nationalism, they achieved a form of nationalism that refused to approach fascism. They became the most prominent intellectual group in all the debates of the following four decades.

From theory and the history of dependency, the forjistas moved on to analyzing contemporary dependency, and along that path they opposed the Roca–Runciman Pact, which Jauretche called the "legal statute of colonialism", subsequently denouncing all government actions aimed at subjecting Argentina to decisions made by British capital, thereby forging a defensive nationalist ideology. Thus, for the first time, a second nationalism emerged—defensive, "left-wing" (although its adherents rejected the label), or of national and popular inspiration—which dedicated the following years to seeking an original, local solution to Argentina's own problems. Almost without exception, they would find it in the emergence of Peronism.

FORJA leaders carried out an intense campaign in favor of neutrality during the Second World War, while conservatives and liberals were determined to enter the war at any cost on the side of the Allies, and right-wing nationalists were divided between a largely neutralist majority sympathetic to the Axis and the almost solitary voice of Enrique P. Osés, who continued to defend Nazism even amid the invasions of European countries.

==== Changes in style ====
In the 1940s, nationalists moved from being a marginal group to becoming a substantial political force in Argentina, emphasizing the need for economic sovereignty, calling for greater industrialization and the absorption of foreign companies.

From the mid-1930s, they had begun to express concern for the working class and support for social reform, with the newspaper La Voz Nacionalista declaring:

The lack of equity, well-being, social justice, and humanity has turned the proletariat into a beast of burden... incapable of enjoying life or the advances of civilization.

By the late 1930s, with increasing industrial development in the country, they promoted a policy of progressive income redistribution to allow wage earners to have more money, enabling them to invest, expand the economy, and increase industrial growth.

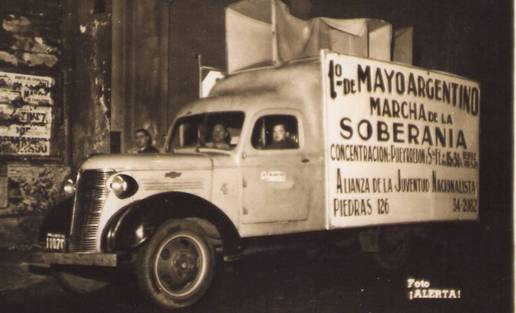
Propaganda vehicle of the Alianza de la Juventud Nacionalista.

With the emergence of the Alianza de la Juventud Nacionalista (AJN) in 1937, positions shifted profoundly. Influenced by the language of dependency theory and even by FORJA, they made, for the first time, an explicit economic proposal: they sought to subject all capital to state control, proposing the nationalization of oil and the petroleum industry, as well as public services. They aimed to divide latifundia into plots of a size sufficient to sustain a family, to be distributed to rural workers. They celebrated May 1 and had their own trade union center, the Federación Obrera Nacionalista Argentina; not very successful, but their concern with unions was indicative of their aims. Most authors identify the AJN as a typical fascist group.

Between 1938 and 1943, the AJN achieved unparalleled success, with each rally exceeding ten thousand attendees. Its members were no longer the classic party led by upper-class leaders followed by the lower middle class out of fear of losing what little privilege remained, but rather an organization formed and led by members of the middle class, with no ties to government or large companies. Another distinctive feature was the change from the traditional slogan "God, Fatherland, and Home" to "Sovereignty, Economic Recovery, and Social Justice"—which, with slight changes, would later be adopted by Peronism. Having appointed General Molina as their leader, they attempted to force him to launch a coup on February 14, 1941, to prevent Argentina from declaring war on the Axis, which they considered imminent. His main collaborator was Lieutenant Colonel Urbano de la Vega, who was to serve as liaison between the revolutionary movement and younger officers. Colonels Eduardo Lonardi and Fortunato Giovannoni expressed willingness to join the conspiracy. Among those sworn in were apparently also then-commanders of the School of Infantry, Lieutenant Colonel Franklin Lucero, and the School of Artillery, Lieutenant Colonel Joaquín Sauri—although the former would later deny any involvement. At the same time, another group led by General Benjamín Menéndez conspired in parallel against the government. Molina's plan was to complete the overthrow and place a politician at the head of a provisional government—in this case Amadeo Sabattini, a Yrigoyenist who had just left the governorship of Córdoba. The coup failed when, in the middle of the night, the Secretary of War, General Juan Nerón Tonazzi, appeared for a surprise inspection. Hours later, Minister of War Carlos Márquez ordered Molina's retirement, which was immediately granted. He was also expelled from the Alianza de la Juventud Nacionalista, but continued in contact with nationalist leaders, now exclusively within the military, such as Lonardi, Giovannoni, and the De la Vega brothers.

Two other groups also emerged in 1941: the Unión Nacional Argentina "Patria", founded and led by former governor of Buenos Aires Manuel Fresco, a champion of electoral fraud in his earlier years, and the Unión Cívica Nacionalista, led by Emilio Gutiérrez Herrero, which had good relations with some trade unions. By 1943, however, no group had managed to unify all nationalist currents, and General Molina himself was expelled from the AJN, which shortly thereafter changed its name to Alianza Libertadora Nacionalista.

Also in the 1940s, the writer and philosopher Jordán Bruno Genta rose to prominence within nationalist circles, often attempting to indoctrinate the military directly. An enemy of both communism and liberalism, he contributed a certain depth of analysis to various nationalist groups. He rejected excessive confidence in science and sought to base the search for truth on knowledge of God and obedience to the Catholic Church. He supported all dictatorships and, over time, became increasingly fanatically anti-communist, seeing communists everywhere: for Genta, both radicals—except for the most clearly conservative—and Peronists were a kind of disguised communists.

By 1943, a military lodge known as the United Officers' Group (GOU), of nationalist tendency, appeared; it feared the threat of communism and defended neutrality. It was this group that organized the Revolution of 1943.

=== The 1940s ===
In the 1940s, the Nacionalistas rose from a fringe group to a substantial political force in Argentina. In the 1940s, the Nacionalistas emphasized the need for economic sovereignty, requiring greater industrialization and the take-over of foreign companies. By the 1940s, the Nacionalistas was effectively run by the military clique known as the Grupo de Oficiales Unidos (GOU). The GOU was highly suspicious of the threat of communism and the Nacionalistas supported the revolution of 1943.

Nacionalistas took control of President Pedro Pablo Ramírez's junta in October 1943, changing Argentina's foreign policy by refusing to permit any further discussion with the United States on the issue of breaking Argentina's relations with the Axis powers. The United States government responded by freezing the assets of Argentine banks in their country. In power, the Nacionalistas pursued a policy of social justice by supporting the appointment of Juan Perón (who later became the President of Argentina) as the head of the department of labour on 28 October 1943. Perón declared that the Nacionalista government was committed to a "revolution" that would keep national wealth in Argentina, give workers their dues, improve living standards without provoking class conflict, and attack both communism and international capitalism.

Facing pressure from the United States for Argentina to dissolve relations with the Axis powers, President Ramírez yielded on 26 January 1944. This was followed by Nacionalistas protesting this action and Ramírez banning all Nacionalista organizations in February. Nacionalista cabinet ministers resigned in protest, and the Nacionalistas subsequently overthrew Ramírez, retaining their hold on power of the government.

As an ideology, Nacionalismo was militaristic, authoritarian, and sympathetic to the rule of a modern caudillo, who the Nationalists were frequently either hoping for or reinterpreting history to locate in the past. Along these lines, a significant part of the intellectual work of Nacionalismo was the creation of historical revisionism as an academic movement in Argentina. Nationalist historians published several works challenging the work of the liberal historians who had forged the dominant historical narrative of Argentina and presented 19th-century dictator Juan Manuel de Rosas as the kind of benevolent authoritarian leader that the country still needed.

=== Peronism: A new opportunity for Nacionalismo ===
On 4 June 1943, an exclusively military coup d’état broke out, seizing control of the government with almost no resistance. Civil society initially supported the coup, as each group believed that the revolution underway was the one it had been waiting for. Radicals and socialists hailed the “democratic revolution”, while General Arturo Rawson resigned and his successor, the Nacionalista Pedro Pablo Ramírez, appointed a large number of Nacionalista militants to cabinet positions in the dictatorship: Jordán Bruno Genta, José María Rosa (hijo), Gustavo Martínez Zuviría, Federico Ibarguren, Alberto Baldrich, Ramón Doll, Bonifacio del Carril, Mario Amadeo and Héctor Llambías, among many others. He also closed political parties, censored the press and expelled hundreds of professors from universities. This convinced antifascists that he was simply a fascist, and within a few days of the coup he had already lost the support of the “democratic” sectors. For their part, the Nacionalistas believed they were witnessing their most complete victory, albeit one achieved without having done anything to obtain it.

==== The origins of Peronism ====
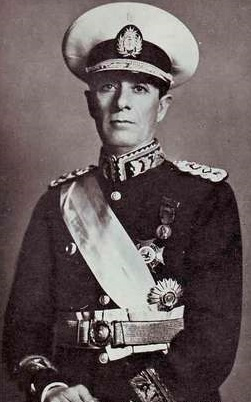
Pedro Pablo Ramírez.

In October, a crisis arose within the government that forced Ramírez to reorganize it; although he conceded some positions to officials from other currents, including conservatives, he also appointed several Nacionalistas. Among them was Gustavo Martínez Zuviría as Minister of Justice and Public Instruction; among his measures were the introduction of ordinary Catholic religious education in public schools, though not compulsory –religious instruction was not mandatory for students whose parents expressly requested otherwise– and the closure of all public universities for several months in response to a student strike. At the end of December, Ramírez appeared to fully endorse Nacionalista demands: he dissolved all political parties and decreed compulsory religious education.

However, although he sympathized with Nacionalistas, Ramírez lacked the ideological grounding necessary to develop a functional corporatist system, and moreover he was entirely loyal to the Army, so he did not even attempt it. The closest approximation was a “National Catholic” regime, perhaps intended merely to display ideological coherence and rely on Nacionalismo without granting it excessive influence in government.

Without prior notice, on 11 January 1944, Ramírez dissolved all Nacionalista organizations. This was partly a concession to conservatives and partly a way of shedding a burden ahead of two already decided measures: breaking relations with the Axis powers and using trade unions as the government’s main base of support, which confirmed the rise of Juan Domingo Perón, Secretary of Labour. After signing the break in relations with Nazi Germany and Fascist Italy, less than a month later Ramírez also resigned the presidency and was replaced by another military figure only slightly more moderate, Edelmiro J. Farrell. Alongside him, as vice president and Minister of War, while retaining the Labour Secretariat, Perón also rose, becoming the central figure of the government, with the support of most trade unions as well as several prominent Nacionalista leaders: Gálvez, Rosa and Palacio, among others. The United States, which had long been pressuring Argentina to align with it by declaring war on the Axis, pretended to believe that Farrell was even worse than Ramírez, and the new dictator was directly labeled a Nazi; in practice, this may have been merely a gesture to increase pressure.

Under Farrell, Nacionalistas began to lose influence within the government. Perón incorporated conservatives who had shifted toward a more moderate form of Nacionalismo, similar to that of FORJA but without any direct connection to it. For its part, the Alianza Libertadora Nacionalista underwent a significant shift; under the leadership of Queraltó, its political debates and speeches lost intensity. The acceleration of political events reduced the space for ideological discussion, and the group became almost exclusively a street-fighting force. It supported Perón uncritically, while he in turn allowed them to act but never relied on them as providers of officials or as interlocutors. During the events of 17 October 1945, the ALN took part in disturbances, antisemitic attacks, assaults on opposition rallies, and various acts of violence, including the killing of a student. Nevertheless, the main protagonists of those days were the trade unions, and the ALN remained very much in the background.

On 27 March 1945, the dictatorship finally declared war on the Axis and prohibited all expressions of support for Nazi Germany. Germany was already on the verge of defeat, and the government believed that failing to make such a declaration would have permanently isolated Argentina from the rest of the continent. The Nacionalistas felt deeply offended: the de facto federal interventor of Tucumán, son of Carlos Ibarguren, ordered all flags to be flown at half-mast, and the interventor of the National University of Tucumán closed it for a week. Nacionalista officials quickly resigned from all positions.

==== Peronist hegemony ====
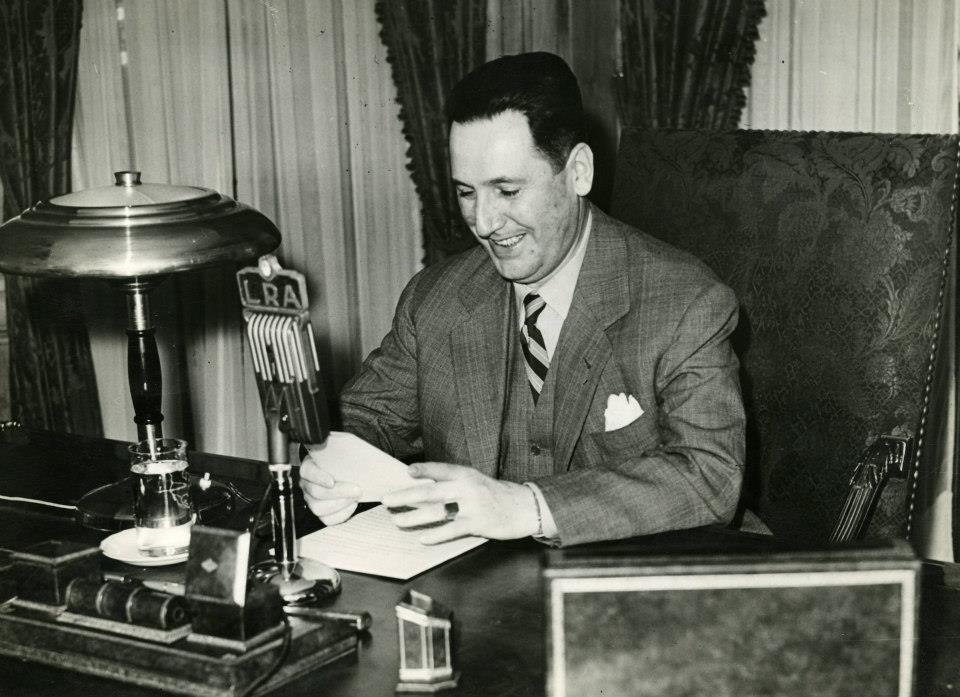
President Juan Perón.

With Perón embodying the role of the strong figure of Nacionalismo, the Alliance lost all influence and was reduced to a group of agitators and provocateurs. It was invited to propose candidates for elections, but only Ernesto Palacio and Joaquín Díaz de Vivar accepted. They presented their own lists in the Federal Capital and the Province of Buenos Aires, obtaining only 4% and 1% respectively –they would also run in the 1948 elections, with even worse results.

During Perón’s presidency, some Nacionalistas who opposed him, such as Father Meinvielle, achieved considerable notoriety. The organizations disappeared one by one, and their intellectual production was almost nonexistent. Most of their arguments were aimed at identifying the origins of Peronist ideas and discourse; they attributed its emphasis on social justice, opposition to British imperialism, and discourse on dependency to Nacionalismo, although it is more likely that Peronism adopted these ideas from FORJA rather than from right-wing Nacionalista organizations. Another common theme was the support of certain right-wing intellectuals for Peronism due to its good relations with the Catholic Church.

Moreover, the Alliance opposed the signing of the Act of Chapultepec and the restoration of relations with the Soviet Union, expressing its opposition through graffiti, attacks on Peronist demonstrators, and bombings of various buildings. In 1953, Queraltó was expelled from the ALN and replaced by Guillermo Patricio Kelly, who redirected the organization, changing its name and publicly aligning it completely with Perón’s government. Meanwhile, the intellectual debate continued to decline: the last Nacionalista publication, Balcón, launched in 1946, propagated a repetitive and victimist discourse.

From 1951 onward, the same year as the first attempted coup against Perón, the Catholic Church began to distance itself from Peronism due to the president’s refusal to authorize the creation of the Christian Democratic Party, which Peronists believed would compete for the same electorate. Nacionalistas became divided: several broke with Perón to remain loyal to the Church. In 1953, a bomb at a Peronist rally killed six people and injured nearly one hundred, after which Kelly’s followers destroyed the headquarters of the Socialist Party and the Jockey Club.

When the conflict escalated into open confrontation, many Nacionalistas took part in conspiracies, the coup that overthrew Perón, and the subsequent government. However, what remained of the ALN was among the last groups to support the president when he chose not to resist and went into exile. The headquarters of the Alianza Libertadora Nacionalista was shelled with its last seventeen defenders inside, two of whom suffered minor injuries.

=== After Perón ===
The new dictator, Eduardo Lonardi, was a former sympathizer of Nacionalismo, as were some of the other military leaders who supported him, most visibly in the case of General Juan Carlos Sanguinetti. He formed a coalition cabinet between Nacionalistas and liberals, and among the former he appointed as ministers Dell'Oro Maini, Clemente Villada Achával, Mario Amadeo and Juan Carlos Goyeneche. The liberals disagreed, and even more so with the gestures in favor of the defeated: they actively pressured the president and eventually secured his resignation. The only Nacionalista minister who remained for a few more months was Dell'Oro Maini, who had time to authorize the creation of private universities. This measure was interpreted by some as a Nacionalista policy – from the point of view that the first would predominantly be Catholic universities – while other authors, such as Lvovich, interpret it as a liberal opening that ran counter to Nacionalista interests.

The few remaining Nacionalista leaders insisted on a policy of reconciliation with Peronism –though not with Perón. The newspaper Azul y Blanco, founded by Marcelo Sánchez Sorondo in early 1956, became their organ and reached a circulation of one hundred thousand copies. From its pages it rejected many of the measures of the dictator Pedro Eugenio Aramburu, especially the executions of Peronists, the imprisonment of officials simply for having been such, and the handling of the constituent convention. Its activity during the dictatorship focused on pressing for a rapid return to constitutional normality. The newspaper was closed by order of Aramburu, not before having participated in the elections for constitutional delegates, divided into two candidate lists: Unión Federal and Partido Azul y Blanco. The Partido Azul y Blanco did not win any seats, while Unión Federal obtained 159 177 votes –1.8% of the total–, which enabled the entry of Enrique E. Ariotti into the Convention. He presented a draft resolution requesting the restoration of the 1949 National Constitution, had a violent exchange with Radical delegates, challenged the legitimacy of the constitutional reform, and withdrew from it.

=== From Frondizi's tortuous path to Illia's inflexibility ===
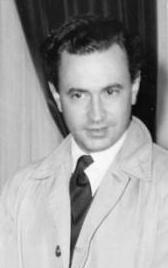
Foreign Minister Carlos Florit.

One year later, the Nacionalistas supported the victory of Arturo Frondizi in the elections, and he responded by appointing Nacionalista figures such as Carlos Florit, Mario Amadeo, Santiago de Estrada and Oscar Camilión as ministers. Frondizi also gathered around him leftists such as Jacobo Timerman and Manuel Madanes, as well as the strongman of his government, Rogelio Frigerio, who was the main promoter of developmentalism in Argentina. Frondizi ended up alienating Nacionalista sectors starting in July 1958 when he shifted his oil policy. Willing to promote foreign investment but lacking YPF capacity, and with means to increase domestic production but no foreign currency to import oil, he decided to negotiate an oil exploitation contract with a subsidiary of Standard Oil. He was heavily criticized, as this contradicted what he had argued in his well-known book Petróleo y política, written before his presidency in 1954. This led to protests and tensions among some Peronist sectors. According to historian Félix Luna:

More than a political reproach, it was a moral reproach.

As a consequence, on 24 July 1958 the president delivered a speech to the nation explaining the situation and consequences of continuing oil imports. The government thus announced the “battle for oil”, aimed at achieving oil self-sufficiency. In his speech he justified his ideological shift, stating simply that Argentina had “not a single gram of gold for YPF”, and that foreign capital would have to be attracted to exploit hydrocarbons, even if oil companies took part of the profits:

When we assumed government, gold reserves amounted to 125.5 million dollars, and total gold and foreign exchange to just over 250 million. From May 1 to December 31 [of 1958] obligations totaling 645 million dollars must be met abroad. Therefore, we do not have a single gram of gold in the Central Bank for YPF.

— Speech by President Arturo Frondizi declaring the “battle for oil”.

For this reason, Nacionalistas soon turned against him, and Azul y Blanco, directed by Sánchez Sorondo, became openly oppositional. The most prominent Nacionalista who remained with Frondizi was Amadeo, who continued until 1962 as Argentina’s permanent representative to the United Nations. Meanwhile, other members of the “old guard”, such as the priest Meinvielle, warned of a supposed advance of communism.

Meanwhile, and contrary to the alleged pact between Frondizi and Perón – whether real or not – the president consistently repressed attempts by Peronism to influence his policies through strikes organized by unions of that tendency. Most historians accept that some form of secret understanding existed between Perón and Frondizi to channel the banned Peronist vote to the UCRI candidate. It is believed to have resulted from discreet negotiations by Frigerio, who contacted John William Cooke or Perón himself during his exile in Venezuela. Meetings were held in Caracas in January 1958 and later in Ciudad Trujillo (Dominican Republic) in March 1958. The alleged pact included fourteen points, such as normalizing unions and the CGT, repealing anti-Peronist decrees, and returning Perón’s confiscated property.

However, Enrique Escobar Cello in his book Arturo Frondizi: el mito del pacto con Perón denied the pact, arguing that no signed copies or verifiable evidence exist. Frondizi himself always denied it. Historian Félix Luna also questioned it for similar reasons. Albino Gómez likewise doubted its existence, suggesting Peronist support stemmed from ideological convergence. In 2015, Juan Bautista Yofre claimed Perón received $500,000 for the pact, although his followers denied that he had accepted money.

In one way or another, it is undeniable that part of Nacionalismo viewed this hostility toward Peronism unfavorably. Concerned about the advance of communism in the region, particularly after it came to power in Cuba –where Azul y Blanco had Rodolfo Walsh as correspondent– many Nacionalistas believed that Peronism was the most effective way to prevent workers from falling under communist influence. Thus, Sánchez Sorondo began a subtle campaign in favor of a coup d’état against Frondizi; the magazine was closed and its director arrested.

Shortly thereafter, the same group attempted to continue its advocacy through a new publication, the magazine Segunda República. This lasted only a short time before it too was closed and Sánchez Sorondo was imprisoned for a second time. At that moment, news emerged of Frondizi’s secret meeting with Che Guevara, and the military came close to overthrowing him. The president’s response was to call elections in all provinces, allowing Peronist participation. The result was a Peronist victory, and both the Army and the government prevented them from taking power: Frondizi annulled the elections, and the Army ultimately overthrew him.

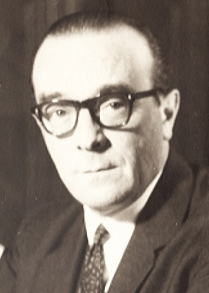
José María Guido.

A curious maneuver brought José María Guido to the presidency, turning him into a dictator without real power, controlled by the Army, which itself was divided between the Blues and Reds, two factions that nearly went to civil war. Nacionalismo failed to organize in response to this unusual political opportunity, limiting itself to commentary and analysis. Only after the “Blue” victory did Amadeo found the Ateneo de la República, while Sánchez Sorondo called for a new coup d’état to block an electoral outcome—precisely the position of the defeated “Reds”.

But the Blues prevailed, elections were held, and Arturo Illia emerged victorious, only to become a president constantly constrained by the military and Peronist trade unionists. While the Ateneo members focused on theorizing about the country’s political future and Peronism, Sánchez Sorondo and others conspired to find the strongman who would carry out a Nacionalista revolution. Small groups emerged, such as the one centered around the Librería Huemul in Buenos Aires, which specialized in promoting Nacionalista and far-right themes. Meanwhile, Jordán Bruno Genta obtained authorization to indoctrinate Air Force officers in the need for “counter-revolutionary war”, a precursor to the National Security Doctrine. A weekly publication called Ulises openly called for a coup, to be followed immediately by a complete transformation of the political and economic system into a corporatist one. The leader expected to carry out the Nacional Revolution was Juan Carlos Onganía; the militarist dream of right-wing Nacionalistas was revived by the old guard and new leaders without new ideas.

=== Tacuara ===
A group of former members of the Nationalist Secondary Students’ Action, rival of the Secondary Students’ Union to which Perón had granted the presidential residence, founded in early 1956 the Tacuara de la Juventud Nacionalista, which soon became known as the Movimiento Nacionalista Tacuara. Its name referred to the tacuaras, strong canes used as spears, a characteristic instrument of indigenous peoples that in the 1 became a typical weapon of the federalist caudillos of Argentina’s interior. The movement was officially created at the end of 1957 at the La Perla del Once bar. The initial group consisted of Luis Demharter, Alberto Ezcurra Uriburu, José "Joe" Baxter, Horacio Bonfanti, Oscar Denovi and Eduardo Rosa. Leadership fell to Luis Demharter, but legal and police problems forced him to withdraw, after which command passed to Ezcurra Uriburu, who on several occasions described himself as a “Nazi”.

In 1958 the group adopted the full name Movimiento Nacionalista Tacuara and gained notoriety in disturbances against supporters of secular education. Tacuara inherited the style of the UNES, with influences from Italian Fascism and German Nazism. Members addressed each other formally and wore very short hair. The magazine Ofensiva, its official organ, featured a Germanic eagle emblem. Its flag consisted of black-red-black stripes, symbolizing national and social revolution, with a Maltese cross.

They were a very small group, numbering about sixty militants in 1964, only fifteen of whom had firearms, plus several hundred sympathizers. However, they enjoyed evident police protection, which encouraged increasingly frequent and violent attacks: they assaulted military units to seize weapons, desecrated the Jewish cemetery of La Tablada, attacked synagogues with bombs, engaged in shootings and knife fights, assaulted the Buenos Aires Policlínico Bancario, and targeted Jewish youths.

At the same time, the group fragmented: some members moved toward Peronism, others toward the left. After the murder of a Jewish youth, even former leader Joe Baxter publicly denounced what he called the “antisemitic hatred” of Ezcurra Uriburu.

Baxter himself founded in 1963 the Movimiento Nacionalista Revolucionario Tacuara, aiming at rural guerrilla warfare, but it soon split, with factions led by Baxter, José Luis Nell and Alfredo Ossorio. Some joined the Peronist Youth, others turned to Trotskyism and helped form the ERP.

In the following years, Tacuara rapidly disintegrated. Its members took diverse paths, from priesthood to guerrilla movements or far-right groups such as the Argentine Anticommunist Alliance and the National Reorganization Process. By 1968, Tacuara had ceased to exist.
