= Civic Revolutionary Movement (Argentina) =

Argentine political party

Civic Revolutionary Movement Movimiento Cívico Revolucionario
- Historical leaders: Adolfo Sánchez Zinny
- Founded: 1955
- Dissolved: 1958
- Preceded by: Nationalist Liberation Alliance
- Ideology: Anti-Peronism; Argentine nationalism Anti-Communism
- Political position: Far-right

The Civic Revolutionary Movement (es: Movimiento Cívico Revolucionario) was an Argentine political party that was the successor of the Nationalist Liberation Alliance.

== History ==
=== Background and founding ===
The Civic Revolutionary Movement (MCR) emerged in Argentina following the coup d'état of September 1955, which overthrew the constitutional government of Juan Domingo Perón. The group was spearheaded and led by the architect Adolfo Sánchez Zinny—a staunch opponent of Perónism who had lived in exile in Uruguay between 1953 and 1955 and had participated in the clandestine organization of the so-called Revolutionary Civic Commands.

The movement was established with the aim of providing a political and institutional structure for the armed civilian groups that had collaborated with the Armed Forces during the 1955 uprising, as well as in the subsequent efforts to take control of labor unions, media outlets, and public institutions.

=== Political Activity and Ideology ===
During the de facto presidency of Pedro Eugenio Aramburu, the MCR acted as a pressure group within the most hardline anti-Peronist faction (known as the "gorilla" or "quedantista" line). The organization defined itself as a "democratic spearhead against totalitarians" and maintained that it was necessary to deepen the "de-Peronization" of Argentine society before allowing for any transition to an electoral process.

In the labor sphere, the movement advocated for the definitive dissolution of the General Confederation of Labor (CGT)—which had been placed under the control of the military regime—and its replacement by a system of trade union pluralism ("free trade unionism"). To disseminate its principles, the group published the newspaper *El 16*—a reference to September 16, 1955—, using its pages to criticize political negotiations between party leaders and displaced factions, while warning against what it termed "tortuous political maneuvering," which, in its view, undermined the objectives of the coup.

=== Decline and Dissolution ===
Towards the end of 1957, the influence of the MCR began to wane due to two main factors: the acceleration of the electoral timeline—promoted by the provisional government to restore institutional normalcy to the country—and the exhaustion resulting from street clashes in the city of Buenos Aires. According to accounts gathered in studies of this period, frequent physical confrontations took place between 1957 and 1958 in the city center—notably in areas such as the intersection of Corrientes and Esmeralda streets—between members of the "Civil Commands" (Comandos Civiles) linked to the MCR and militants of the Peronist resistance.

With the presidential elections of February 1958 and the subsequent inauguration of Arturo Frondizi on May 1 of that year, the political landscape shifted decisively. Having lost the state backing of the outgoing administration and lacking an electoral base of its own, the Revolutionary Civic Movement (Movimiento Cívico Revolucionario) ceased its organized activities and effectively dissolved during 1958. Meanwhile, several of its leaders returned to private life or joined other nationalist and anti-Peronist factions—including Sánchez Zinny himself, who would go into exile once again after participating in the 1960 military uprising in San Luis.

== See also ==
- Nationalist Liberation Alliance
- Revolucion Libertadora
