= Argentine Fascist Party =

Argentine Fascist Party Partido Fascista Argentino
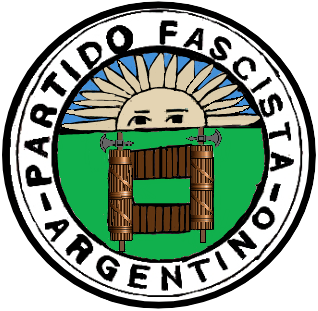
- Leader: Nicholás Vitelli; Nimio de Anquín
- Founder: Ottavio Dinale
- Founded: 1932
- Dissolved: 1936
- Preceded by: National Fascist Party
- Succeeded by: National Fascist Union
- Headquarters: Buenos Aires
- Ideology: Nacionalismo
- Political position: Far-right
- International affiliation: Fascios all'stero

The Argentine Fascist Party (Partido Fascista Argentino, PFA) was a fascist political party in Argentina from 1932 until its official disbandment in 1936, when it was succeeded by the National Fascist Union (Unión Nacional Fascista, UNF). Founded by Italian Argentines, the party was formed as a breakaway faction from Argentina's National Fascist Party (Partido Nacional Fascista, PNF). It was based upon Italian fascism and was recognized by Benito Mussolini's National Fascist Party in 1935. In the 1930s the party became a mass movement, particularly in Córdoba Province. Nicholás Vitelli led the PFA's branch in Córdoba until his death in 1934, when Nimio de Anquín took the leadership of the party.

The PFA's main political allies in Córdoba were the Argentine Civic Legion and the Argentine Nationalist Action/Affirmation of a New Argentina movement.
