= Alberto Baldrich =

Argentine philosopher and sociologist

Alberto Baldrich (January 20, 1898 – December 19, 1982) was an Argentine philosopher and sociologist who served as Minister of Justice and Public Instruction (1944–45) during the de facto presidency of General Edelmiro Farrell (1944–46).

== Biography ==
He was born in Buenos Aires, the son of General Alonso Baldrich. He was one of the original members of the Institute of Sociology at the Faculty of Arts at the University of Buenos Aires, created and directed in 1940 by Ricardo Levene. His intellectual circle included Hector Bernard, Adolfo Silenzio de Stagni, Federico Ibarguren, and Ramón Doll.

Baldrich was appointed financial comptroller of Tucumán Province by the de facto President, General Pedro Pablo Ramírez, in 1943, and in 1944 he was appointed Minister of Justice and Public Instruction by President Farrell, replacing conservative Catholic writer Gustavo Martinez Zuviría. His administration continued the nationalist elitist line Martínez began, but was more geared to Hispanism and economic nationalism. He appointed as Assistant Secretary of Education, working with Adolfo Silenzio de Stagni; during the Revolution of 1943, he adhered himself to Peronism. Following Juan Perón's return from exile in 1973, he was appointed education minister of Buenos Aires Province by the newly elected Governor, Oscar Bidegain. Baldrich died in Buenos Aires in 1982.

== Bibliography ==
- Ferrero, Roberto A. (1976), Fraud against popular sovereignty, Buenos Aires: La Bastilla. (1976).
- Potash, Robert A. Potash, Robert A. (1981), The army and politics in Argentina, 1928-1945, Buenos Aires:Sudamericana. (1981).
