= Guillermo Patricio Kelly =

Argentine politician

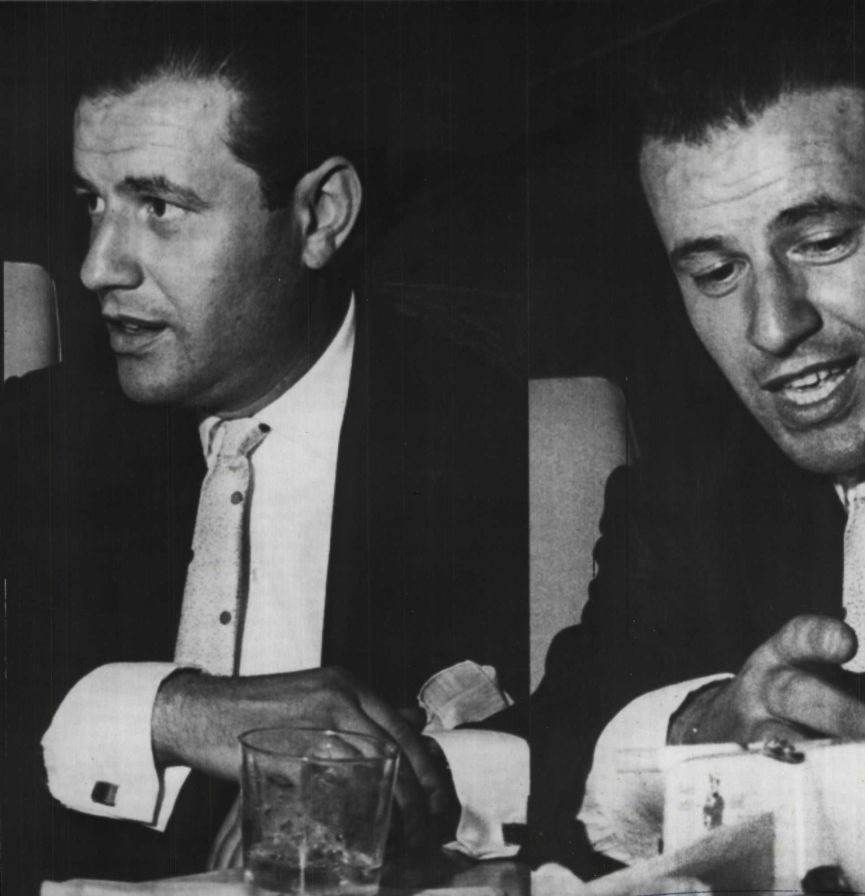
- Born: July 29, 1921; Avellaneda, Argentina
- Died: July 1, 2005 (aged 83); Buenos Aires, Argentina
- Occupations: Politician, activist
- Known for: Former leader of the Nationalist Liberation Alliance; Kidnapping victim

Guillermo Patricio Kelly (b. Avellaneda, Buenos Aires, Argentina, 29 July 1921 – d. Buenos Aires, July 1, 2005) was a politician and activist, the leader of the Nationalist Liberation Alliance (ALN) of Argentina from 1953 to 1955. He led the party to drop its former antisemitism. Arrested after the military coup in 1955, Kelly escaped and fled the country. He later returned to Argentina and became active again, this time in left-wing politics.

== Leader of the ALN ==
Kelly sought to move the ALN from its antisemitic past. He met with Israel's ambassador to Argentina, Dr. Aryeh Leon Kubowitzki, and told him that the ALN had forsworn antisemitism. In 1954, antisemitism was dropped from the party platform.

Kelly was arrested for having used a forged passport after the 1955 anti-Peronist Revolución Libertadora, a coup d'état by the military. He escaped and fled the country in 1957. Kelly later turned to left-wing radicalism.

He returned to the country. On 24 August 1983, Kelly was kidnapped and released some hours later. Aníbal Gordon, a suspected member of Triple A, a right-wing death squad founded in 1973 by the Perón government, was charged with Kelly's kidnapping and in 1985 convicted of three other murders during the early 1970s.

== See also ==
- List of kidnappings
- Lists of solved missing person cases
