= National Fascist Party (Argentina) =

National Fascist Party Partido Nacional Fascista
- Founded: 1923
- Dissolved: 1932
- Succeeded by: Argentine Fascist Party
- Ideology: Fascism; Corporatism
- Political position: Far-right

Party flag

The National Fascist Party of Argentina (Partido Nacional Fascista) was a fascist political party that was formed in 1923.

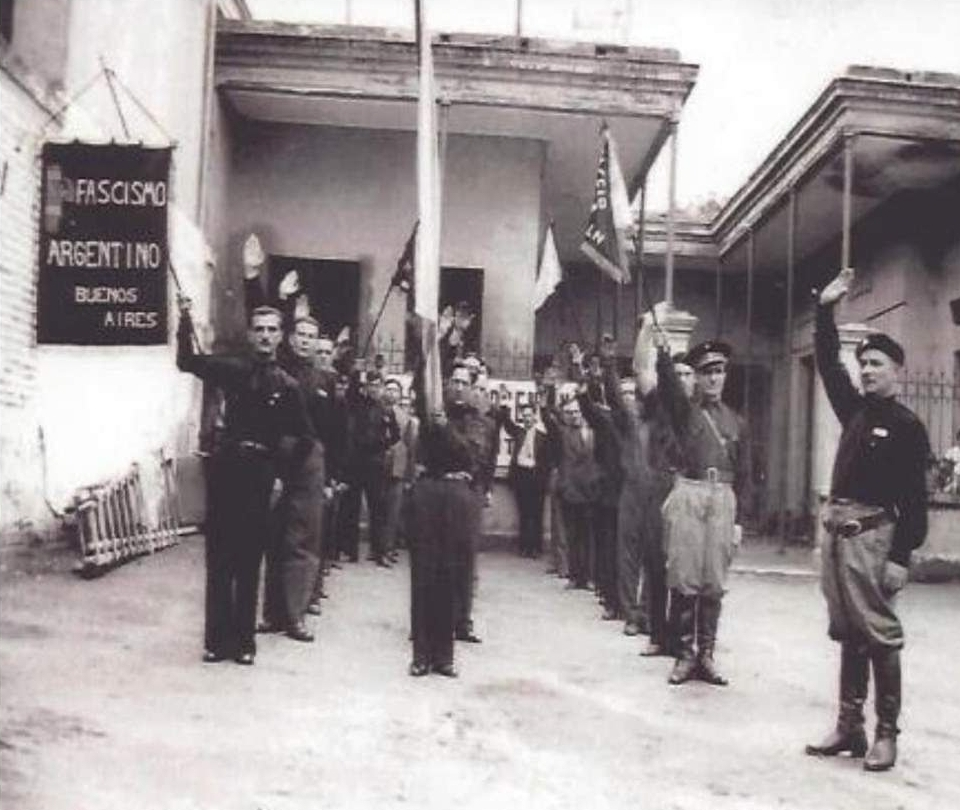
PNFA Militants

The National Fascist Party, the first fascist party in Argentina, had as bases for its emergence, as well as that of similar parties in Europe, the weakening of the role of society in the government of the country and the contemporary economic crises.

In 1932, a group broke away from the party to form the Argentine Fascist Party, which eventually became a mass movement in the country's Córdoba region.
