= Nimio de Anquín =

Argentine writer and fascist politician

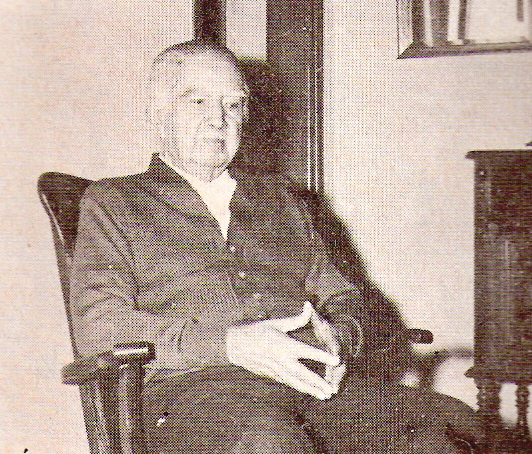
- Born: Nimio de Anquín; 12 August 1896; Córdoba, Argentina
- Died: 16 May 1979 (aged 82); Córdoba, Argentina
- Education: National University of Córdoba
- Occupation: Lecturer
- Known for: Politician
- Political party: National Fascist Union

Nimio de Anquín (12 August 1896 – 16 May 1979) was an Argentine Thomist writer, political theorist, and fascist leader. Seeking to combine European models of fascism with his own attachment to the Catholic Church, he led several movements and for a time had a strong following. Subsequently, however, he lost political influence, and his later life was mainly focused on his academic career.

== Early years ==
A native of Córdoba, de Anquín studied law at the National University of Córdoba. With his studies in Argentina completed, he traveled to Germany to study philosophy under Ernst Cassirer.

In Europe, de Anquín developed his interest in politics and became a follower of the ideas of Charles Maurras after coming into contact with his work. Soon, de Anquín sought to develop his own political ideas by seeking to combine Thomism with Hegelianism, which led him to call for a national syndicalist state.

== Fascist leader ==
He was a founder of the Instituto San Tomás de Aquino in Córdoba in 1929, a group that would become linked to the Argentine Fascist Party. In 1934, he joined the Fascismo Argentino de Córdoba (Blueshirts). By the following year, he had taken over as leader of the group, which had changed its name to the Frente de Fuerzas Fascistas in 1935. Various groups then merged in 1936 to emerge as the Unión Nacional Fascista under de Anquin's leadership.

A strong admirer of Benito Mussolini and Italian fascism, de Aquín argued that Argentine Nacionalismo should follow the Italian model by seeking to mobilise mass support but that the domestic version of fascism should put a stronger emphasis on the centrality of Catholicism to national identity than its European counterparts did.

However, de Anquín found it difficult to lead the fascist movement in the face of opposition. In 1934, he was suspended from his lectureship at the Colegio Nacional de Monserrat, in Córdoba because of the violence of his movement. The violence continued, however, until active repression began in late 1936, when he attempted to force university students to sign a letter in support of Francisco Franco. By 1939, the Unión Nacional Fascista was effectively moribund.

== Later years ==
With his movement now defunct, de Anquín returned to lecturing, initially in his home town then later in Santa Fe.

He did not abandon politics altogether, however, and became associated with the journals Sol y Luna and Nueva Política and, on a more religious note, the group of intellectuals around Marcelo Sánchez Sorondo. He also wrote in praise of Adolf Hitler by stating in 1941 that "by the work of the great Hitler, liberalism and ugly democracy have died."

He continued to write on political matters until late in his life, focusing on his two favoured themes of militant nationalism and anti-democracy.
