= Argentine Patriotic League =

Argentine Patriotic League Liga Patriótica Argentina
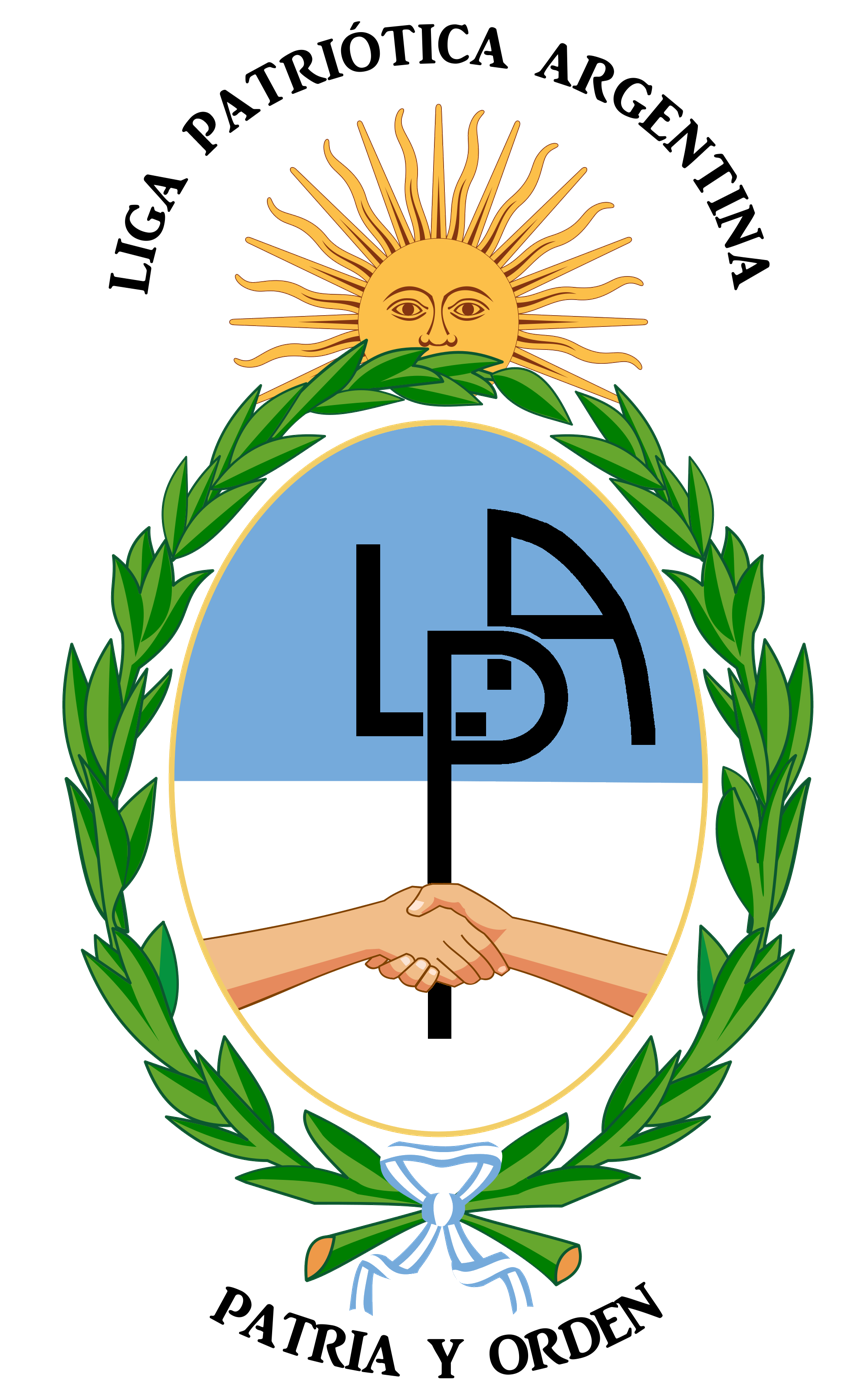
- Abbreviation: LPA
- Leader: Manuel Carlés
- Founded: January 16, 1919
- Dissolved: 1931
- Succeeded by: Argentine Civic Legion
- Headquarters: Buenos Aires, Argentina
- Membership: 300,000+ (1920s)
- Ideology: Nacionalismo; Fascism; Corporatism; Radicalism; Economic liberalism
- Political position: Far-right
- Colors: Light blue

Party flag

The Argentine Patriotic League (Spanish: Liga Patriótica Argentina) was a Nacionalista paramilitary group, officially created in Buenos Aires on January 16, 1919, during the Tragic Week. Presided over by Manuel Carlés, a professor at the Military College and the Escuela Superior de Guerra, it also counted among its members the deputy Santiago G. O'Farrell (1861–1926). The League was merged into the Argentine Civic Legion in 1931. The Argentine Patriotic League formed part of a larger movement of patriotic leagues active in Chile and Argentina during the early 20th century.

== History ==
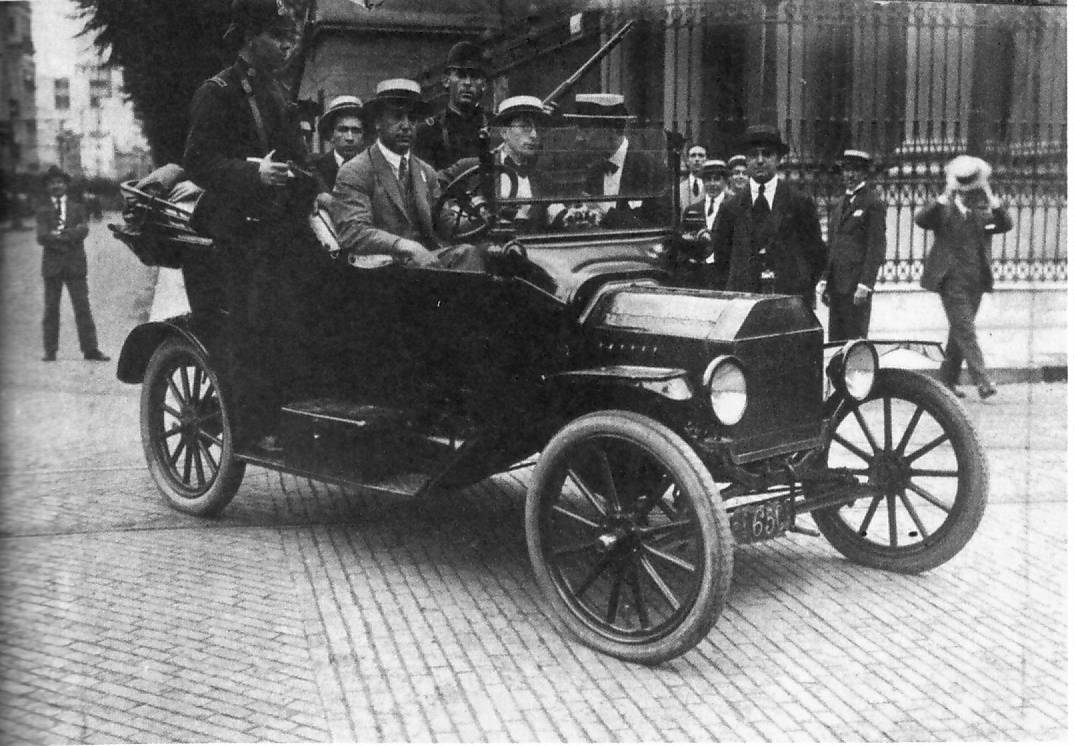
Armed members of the Patriotic League roaming the streets of Buenos Aires.

Composed of wealthy youth, the League assaulted workers' neighborhoods, including the Jewish Once neighborhood of Buenos Aires. It received military training from members of the Argentine Armed Forces, was subsidized by important members of the oligarchy, and supported by the Church. The League worked hand-in-hand with the Bonaerense police forces in the repression of social movements. Some of its members were also members of the Radical Party.

It quickly extended itself throughout Argentina, on a nationalist, xenophobic, anti-Communist and antisemitic program. They attacked in particular Catalans (accused of being anarchists) and Jews (accused of being Bolsheviks).

At its height in the early 1920s, the League's so-called brigades contained as many as 300,000 members throughout the country. The League counted with the official support of the admiral and Minister of Marine Manuel Domecq García.

The League participated to the events known as Patagonia rebelde or Patagonia Trágica (1921–1922), in Río Gallegos, during which 1,500 workers on strike were assassinated.

It also participated to José Félix Uriburu's 1930 military coup, which initiated the Infamous Decade.

== Bibliography ==
- Caterina, Luis María. 1995. La Liga Patriótica Argentina. Un grupo de presión frente a las convulsiones sociales de la década del '20. Buenos Aires, Editorial Corregidor. ISBN 978-950-05-0839-1 reseña

== See also ==
- Tacuara Nationalist Movement
