= 1930 Argentine coup d'état =

Start of the 'Infamous Decade'

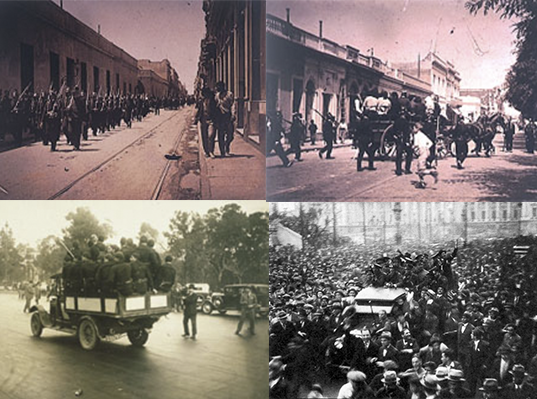
- Images of the coup d'état carried out in Argentina in 1930
Date	6 September 1930
Location	Buenos Aires, Argentina
Result	Victory of Nacionalistas: Overthrow of the government of Hipólito Yrigoyen; Suspension of the Argentine Constitution and establishment of military dictatorship; Start of the Infamous Decade

Belligerents
Nacionalistas: Argentine Army; Argentine Patriotic League; Antipersonalista Radicals	Government of Argentina: Radical Civic Union

Commanders and leaders
José Félix Uriburu	(Argentina) Hipólito Yrigoyen (Argentina) Enrique Martínez

The 1930 Argentine coup d'état, also known as the September Revolution by its supporters, involved the overthrow of the Argentine government of Hipólito Yrigoyen by forces loyal to General José Félix Uriburu. The coup took place on 6 September 1930 when Uriburu led a small detachment of troops into the capital, experiencing no substantial opposition and taking control of the Casa Rosada. Large crowds formed in Buenos Aires in support of the coup. Uriburu's forces took control of the capital and arrested Radical Civic Union supporters.

There were no casualties in the coup. Future Argentinean President Juan Perón took part in the coup on the side of Uriburu.

The coup led to the end of constitutional government in Argentina and the establishment of a military dictatorship. Argentine politics would be characterized by considerable political instability (weak democracies, coups, military dictatorships) into the 1980s.

== Background ==
In the lead up to the coup, the Yrigoyen government brought more power into the presidency and away from the legislature by sending large groups of his followers into the provinces, cutting off the Conservative support base. By 1922, the democratic legitimacy of the government was in question and support for Argentine democracy had begun to waver.

Uriburu's coup was supported by the Nacionalistas. Uriburu himself was part of the Nacionalista Argentine Patriotic League and had the support of a number of Nacionalista military officers. Nacionalista plans for such a coup had been developing since 1927, when politician Juan Carulla approached Uriburu for support of a coup to entrench an Argentine version of Fascist Italy's Charter of Labour. With the onset of the Great Depression in 1929 that impacted Argentina, Yrigoyen lost political support as he retrenched government services which resulted in acceleration of unemployment.

Opposition parties won the congressional elections of 1928 and 1930.

Yrigoyen's consolidation of powers drew condemnation even from politically aligned parties, and the opposition parties formally protested his rule on 9 August 1930. On the 20th, this statement was joined by a similar protest issued by the opposing faction within the Radical Civic Union.

== Aftermath ==
In the aftermath of the coup, major changes to Argentinean politics and government took place, with Uriburu banning political parties, suspending elections, and suspending the 1853 Constitution. Uriburu proposed that Argentina be reorganized along corporatist and fascist lines. The coup marked the start of the Infamous Decade, a 13-year period during which the military ruled Argentina through repression, political corruption and electoral fraud.
