= Tragic Week (Argentina) =

1919 Argentinian pogrom against leftists

- Part of Revolutions of 1917–1923
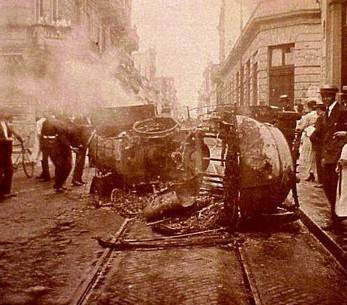
- Disturbances during Tragic Week
- Date: January 1919
- Location: Buenos Aires, Argentina
- Also known as: Semana Trágica
- Participants: Argentine Federal Police, the military, and the Argentine Patriotic League
- Deaths: 77-700, 100+ Jews

Tragic Week (Spanish: Semana Trágica), also known as Bloody Week, was a series of riots and massacres that took place in Buenos Aires, Argentina, from January 7 to 14, 1919. An uprising led by anarchists and communists was eventually crushed by the Argentine Federal Police, the military, and the Argentine Patriotic League. Estimates of the death toll vary but are estimated to be 77-700, mostly of workers at the hands of the government forces.

== Violence and bloodshed ==
When militant workers at the Vasena metal works went on strike in Buenos Aires in early January 1919 there was soon an upsurge of street violence which resulted in the death of a policeman (Vicente Chávez). The police responded with violence of their own and in one demonstration five workers were killed and another 20 were wounded. Second Lieutenant Antonio Marotta from the Argentine Army and Pascual Arregui from the Manifestación Patriótica (Patriotic Manifestation) vigilante movement were also reportedly killed in this action.

The city erupted, with police and supporting vigilante groups operating together to target those whom they perceived as foreign enemies, notably Germán Boris Wladimirovich, Gregorio Petroff, Andrés Ragapeloff, Moisés Scutz, José Buwitz, Máximo Sagarin, Iván Mijin, Simón Bolkosk and their followers who were accused of organizing a Communist revolution.

General Luis Dellepiane and his 2nd Division along with reinforcements in the form of 500 Marines restored order. These events became known, because of the violence and bloodshed, as 'Tragic Week'.

== See also ==
- Patagonia rebelde
- Argentine Regional Workers' Federation
- List of cases of police brutality in Argentina
