= Santiago G. O'Farrell =

Argentinian politician

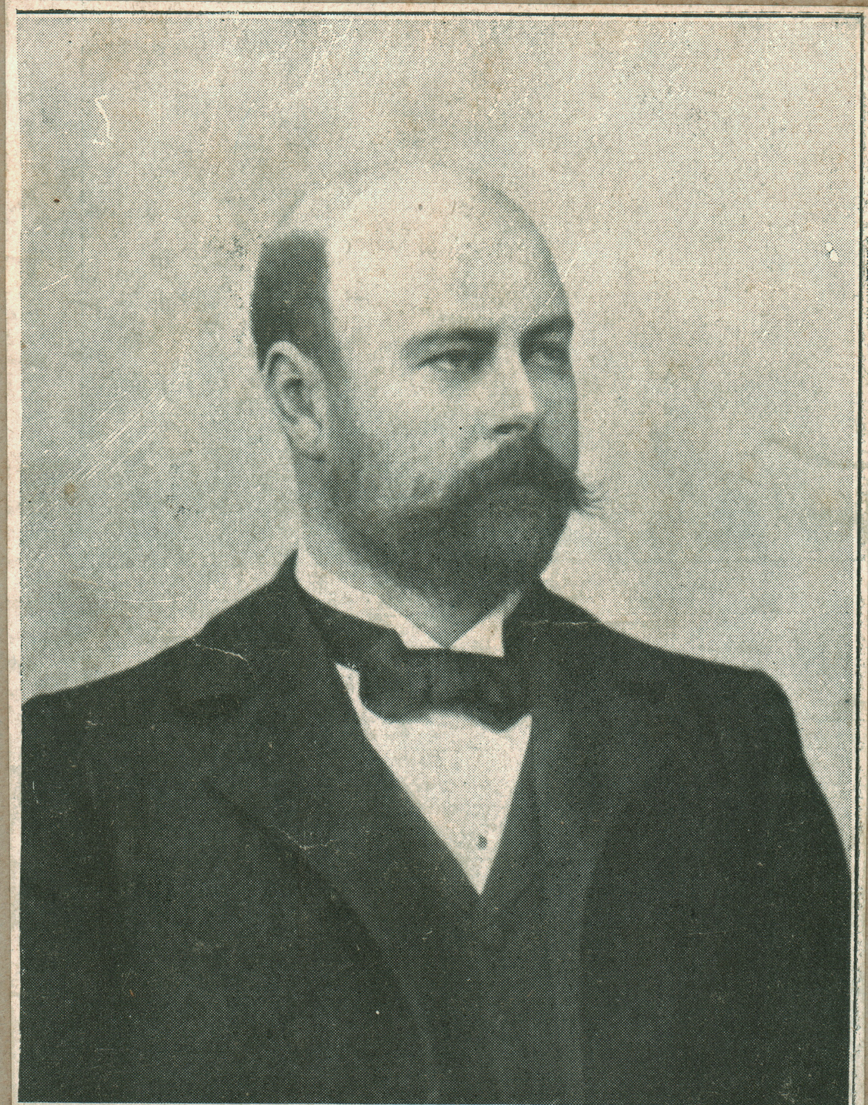

Santiago Gregorio O'Farrell (14 March 1861 – 15 May 1926) was an Argentine politician and lawyer of Irish descent. He was a member of the National Civic Union and the League of Christian Democrats. He is considered a leading Latin American supporter of Christian democracy. He served three terms in the Argentine Chamber of Deputies for Buenos Aires.

== Family ==
His father, Don Miguel O’Farrell, was a rancher and politician, who became a deputy in the provincial legislature of Buenos Aires. His mother, Mary Seery y Casey, was from Mullingar, County Westmeath. O'Farrell spent 1873-74 in Colegio del Salvador but in 1875 he moved to the Jesuit-run Immaculate Conception in Santa Fe Province. In 1883, he graduated from the University of Buenos Aires with a degree in law and began to practice Law. A year later, he married Margarita Harrington Culligan, daughter of Juan (John) Harrington y Harrington, a rancher born in County Cork. They were married in Regina Martyrum Parish in Buenos Aires and had thirteen children.

== Law and politics ==
In 1883, the year he graduated, he founded the O'Farrell Law firm in Buenos Aires, which remains one of the oldest and most prestigious law firms in existence in Argentina. He became involved in politics in 1889 joining the Civic Union and when that party split he went with the National Civic Union whilst his younger brother, Juan, joined the Radical Civic Union. In 1893 at the age of 32 he was appointed president of the Catholic Workers' Circles founded the previous year by the Redemptorist priest Federico Grote. Fr Grote spent his time promoting the Social teaching of the Church especially found in the Social Encyclicals of Pope Leo XIII, e.g. Rerum Novarum. In O’Farrell he found a layman who was equally enthusiastic about the Social Gospel.

He served three terms in the Argentine federal parliament between 1896 and 1910. His period in the legislature was dominated by his defence of the family and several interventions about the weaknesses of the army. After he left politics he involve himself extensively in social, Church and especially Irish issues. One of the issues he pressed for was a monument to Admiral William Brown, the Irish born hero of Argentine independence. O’Farrell died in 1926.
