= Aryeh Leon Kubowitzki =

Israeli lawyer and diplomat (1896–1966)

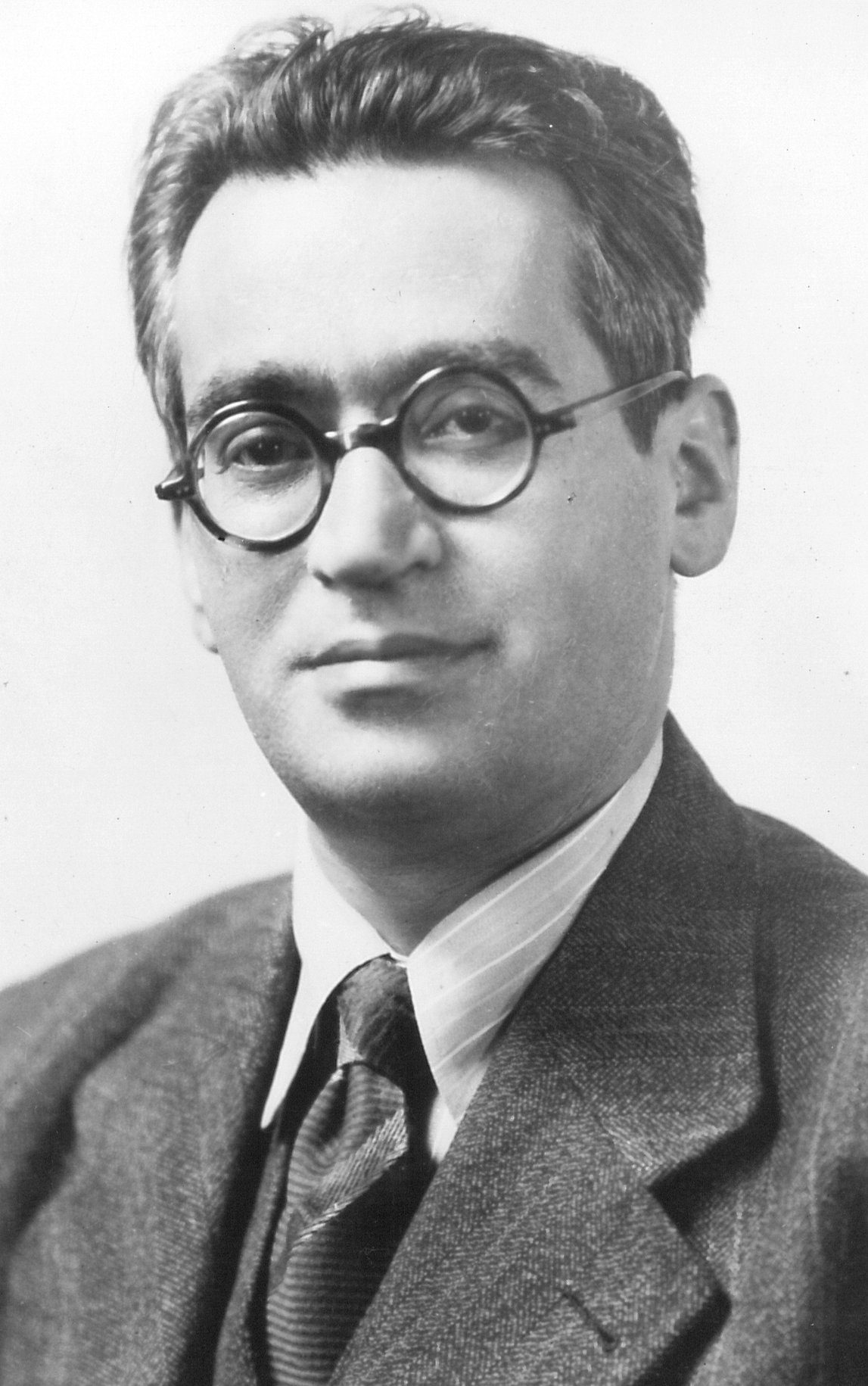
- Photograph of Kubowitzki in 1938.

Personal details
- Born: 2 November 1896; Kuršėnai, Russian Empire (now Lithuania)
- Died: 16 May 1966 (aged 69); Jerusalem, Israel

Aryeh Leon Kubowitzki (2 November 1896 – 16 May 1966) was an Israeli lawyer and diplomat.

== Early life ==
Aryeh Leon Kubowitzki was born on 2 November 1896 in Kuršėnai, Russian Empire.

== Career ==
=== World Jewish Congress ===
Kubowitzki was one of the founders of the World Jewish Congress (WJC) in August 1936.

On 1 July 1944 Kubowitzki wrote to John W. Pehle opposing proposals to conduct aerial bombardment of the extermination camps on the grounds that "the first victims would be the Jews". Kubowitzki instead proposed that Soviet paratroopers and members of the Polish resistance be instructed to attack the installations.

He served as the Secretary-General of the WJC from 1945 to 1948.

=== Diplomat ===
Kubowitzki made aliyah in 1948.

Kubowitzki served as the Israeli ambassador to Czechoslovakia, Poland, and several South American countries.

== Retirement and death ==
Kubowitzki died on 16 May 1966 in Jerusalem, Israel.

== Personal life ==
Kubowitzki was married to Myriam Goldstein-Kubovy (1897–1992).
