= National Fascist Union =

National Fascist Union Unión Nacional Fascista
- Historic Leader: Nimio de Anquín
- Founded: 1936
- Dissolved: 1939
- Preceded by: Argentine Fascist Party
- Ideology: Fascism; Clerical fascism; Nacionalismo; Corporatism; Anti-communism; Falangism
- Political position: Far-right

The National Fascist Union (Unión Nacional Fascista, UNF) was a fascist political party formed in Argentina in 1936, as the successor to the Argentine Fascist Party.

In August 1936, UNF leader Nimio de Anquín attempted to force students at a law school in Cordoba to pledge a statement of support for the Spanish general Francisco Franco. Police responded with a crackdown against Argentine nationalists. Support for the UNF surged after two nationalists were shot and killed in the Colegio Montserrat in 1938. In the aftermath of the Montserrat murders, Anquin denounced the middle and upper class for complicity and cowardice and claimed that "communism, Judaism, and degenerate Radicalism" were responsible for causing the murders. Anquín called for the mourners to swear "by God, honour, and the Fatherland, to return the homicidal bullet".

By 1939, the UNF was largely defunct, and Anquín retired from the political scene to resume his earlier career as a lecturer.
