= Juan Bautista Molina =

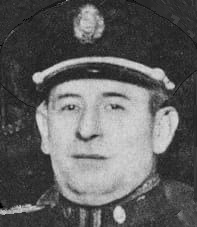
Juan Bautista Molina

Brigadier General Juan Bautista Molina (29 August 1882 – 17 September 1963) was an Argentine military commander and a pro-Nazi Argentine ultranationalist who led the Nationalist Liberation Alliance (ALN).

Molina was involved in a number of plots to overthrow the Argentine liberal government of Agustín Pedro Justo in the 1930s. In order to contain Molina, President Justo appointed Molina as Argentina's military attaché in Germany in 1933 where Molina witnessed the Nazi regime that impressed him. Molina was promoted to brigadier general in 1937 and this was followed by his appointment as director general of the army engineers in 1938. Molina retired from army service in 1938 and devoted attention to his leadership of the AJN.

In 1935, Molina called for the dissolution of the three powers of the national government, the abolition of political parties, the establishment of a military dictatorship, the enacting of press censorship, and actions to prevent "immorality", and changing the economic system to be led by guilds and the creation of a "consultative board [to] unite" workers and employers. In 1941, Molina organized a coup that was to break out on the morning of 14 February. He was paranoid that Argentina was about to join the Allied Powers. However, the coup was foiled by a surprise inspection by a government officer the night before the coup, which resulted in Molina being suspended from the Army. In 1943, Molina led street demonstrations led by nationalist protestors against the Ramón Castillo government for its promotion of Argentine neutrality in World War II, demanding that Argentina instead join the Axis powers. During the protest, Molina's supporters shouted violent anti-American, anti-British, and antisemitic slogans, saying "Death to the British pigs" and "Death to the Jews".
