= Nationalist Liberation Alliance =

Nationalist Liberation Alliance Alianza Libertadora Nacionalista
- Historical leaders: Juan Bautista Molina, Juan Queraltó,(1937-1953); Guillermo Patricio Kelly (1953-1955)
- Founded: 1°: 1937; 2°: 1973 (re-established)
- Dissolved: 1°: 1955; 2°: 1976
- Preceded by: Argentine Patriotic League
- Succeeded by: Labour Party; Civic Revolutionary Movement; Tacuara Nationalist Movement
- Headquarters: Calle San Martín 392, Ciudad de Buenos Aires
- Newspaper: Combate; Tacuara; Alianza
- Student wing: Unión Nacionalista de Estudiantes Secundarios
- Ideology: Peronism; Ultranationalism; Militarism; Argentine nationalism Antisemitism; Fascism; Neo-Nazism; Corporatism; Anti-imperialism; Anti-capitalism; Anti-communism; Clerical Fascism; Falangism; Populism (Laborism); National Catholicism; Argentine irredentism
- Political position: Far-right
- Colours: Black
- Slogan: "Hierarchy and order"
- Anthem: Canción del aliancista

Election symbol
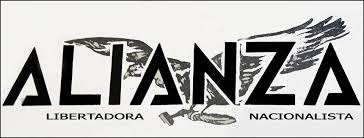

Party flag
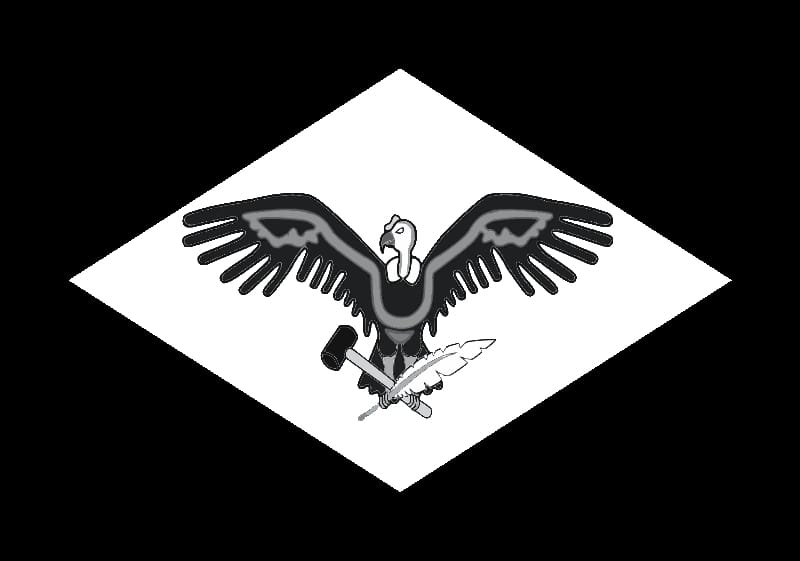

The Nationalist Liberation Alliance (Spanish: Alianza Libertadora Nacionalista, ALN), was an Argentine nationalist far-right group, notable for its violent actions. It was founded as the Nationalist Youth Alliance in September 1937 by Juan Queraltó and the engineer Carlos Burundarena, professor at the University of Buenos Aires (UBA). The two founders were active in the Nationalist Union of Secondary Students (UNES), which had been established by Queraltó himself following the 1930 military coup to support the government of José Félix Uriburu. The Nationalist Youth Alliance was intended to channel the activism of UNES members once they had completed their secondary education. UNES continued to exist as a secondary-level organization affiliated with the Alliance until 1955.

In May 1943, following the coup d'état, the AJN changed its name to Alianza Libertadora Nacionalista. From October 1943 until 1955, they published the newspaper "Alianza." Although the backgrounds of most of its members were linked to Catholic nationalism, the group identified itself with Peronism.

In its political activities, the Alianza Libertadora Nacionalista initially employed the fascist salute; its members wore gray-shirt uniforms with leather equipment belts, and its symbol—a black condor in a blue sky against a red background, clutching a hammer and a quill in its talons—represented the union of intellectuals and workers. Ideologically, the movement was corporatist, anti-liberal, antisemitic, and anti-imperialist. It criticized the corrupt democratic political system and the conservative oligarchy that had governed the country during the 1930s. Furthermore, it rejected both communism and capitalism, advocating instead for the establishment of an authoritarian corporatist state. It was one of the first nationalist organizations to support Peronism, although it participated in the 1946 elections with its own slate of candidates. It maintained a degree of autonomy from Peronism until the 1950s, when Guillermo Patricio Kelly displaced Queraltó, leaving the organization completely subordinate to the Perón government. On September 21, 1955—following the coup d'état known as the "Liberating Revolution" (Revolución Libertadora)—Army tanks shelled and demolished the headquarters of the Alianza Libertadora Nacionalista in downtown Buenos Aires, killing some of its members. Following the 1955 coup, several militants from the Alianza Libertadora Nacionalista participated—in an informal or non-structured capacity—in the Peronist Resistance. The Alianza Libertadora Nacionalista re-emerged in 1973, with Juan Queraltó returning to its leadership.

== History ==
It was recognized as a political entity on 20 May 1931 and received juridical personality on 11 January 1932. The movement was formed by Argentine President General José Félix Uriburu officially as a reserve for Argentina's armed forces. The movement's members were authorized to receive military training. The Legion declared itself to be made up of "patriotic men" who embodied "the spirit of the September revolution and who morally and materially were ready to cooperate in the institutional reconstruction of the country". The Legion was the largest nationalist organization in Argentina in the early 1930s. The movement is known to have committed acts of violence against its political opponents and tortured those that were captured. It collapsed in 1955 after anti-Peronist forces seized control of Argentina with its leader fleeing the country.

It had a student wing called the Nationalist Union of Secondary Students (Unión Nacionalista de Estudiantes Secundarios, UNES). Unlike other Argentine nationalist organizations of the time, the Legion had a women's section, while other nationalist groups excluded women from their organizations. The Legion's women section called Agrupación Femenina de la LCA promoted women to love the armed forces and respect for order, authority, and hierarchy in the home and school. These women were to provide aid to the poor to assist in establishing social peace.

During the 1946 Argentine elections, the ALN was the largest Nacionalista movement but only gained 25,000 votes in a few areas in which it fielded candidates. This coincided with the election of Juan Perón as President of Argentina. Following the 1946 election, ALN members attacked the headquarters of several liberal and leftist newspapers, including La Hora, the Communist Party newspaper, as well as attacking a bar in downtown Buenos Aires that was frequented by Spanish republican refugees. A number of Jewish associations became also the target of blast bombs planted by ALN members.

In 1953, the ALN condemned the nationalist newspaper La Prensa for publishing too many articles by Jewish writers. ALN leader Juan Queraltó was ousted from leadership of the party in 1953. Queraltó was succeeded by Guillermo Patricio Kelly. Kelly sought to distance the party from its anti-Semitic past and met with Israel's ambassador to Argentina, Dr. Aryeh Leon Kubovy during which Kelly informed Dr. Kubovy that the ALN had forsworn anti-Semitism. In 1954, anti-Semitism was dropped from the party. The headquarters of the ALN were stormed and destroyed by rebel Sherman tanks during the anti-Peronist Revolución Libertadora on 21 September 1955. Kelly was arrested in the aftermath by Argentine authorities, but eventually managed to escape and fled the country in 1957.

In 1973, after the comeback of Perón to power, former members, including Kelly and Queraltó, attempted a revival of the ALN, but were overshadowed by newer far right groups which eventually became subordinated to the Argentine Anticommunist Alliance.

== Party symbols ==
The Nationalist Liberation Alliance used the Andean condor as the symbol of the movement. The Andean condor is a national symbol of Argentina.

== Gallery ==
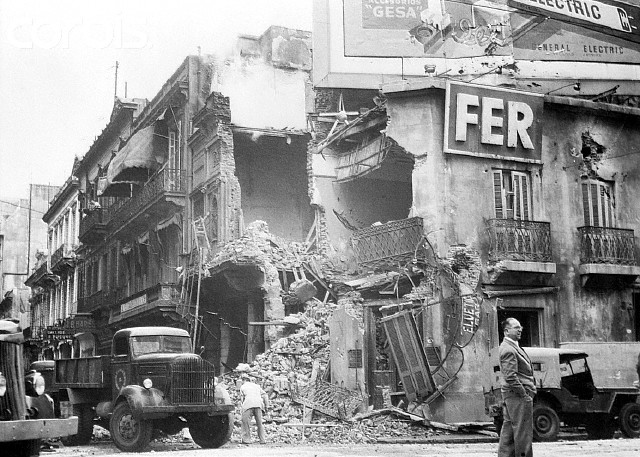
Headquarters of the ALN in Buenos Aires after being assaulted by rebel tanks, 21 September 1955

== See also ==
- Peronism
