= Hugo Wast =

Argentine novelist and script writer

Hugo Wast

Gustavo Adolfo Martínez Zuviría (October 23, 1883 – March 28, 1962), best known under his pseudonym Hugo Wast, was a renowned Argentine novelist and script writer.

== Biography ==
Born Gustavo Martínez Zuviría in Córdoba, Argentina, his family relocated to Santa Fe, and he enrolled at the University of Santa Fe, receiving a law degree in 1907. Martínez Zuviría first used the pen name "Hugo Wast" for his 1911 novel, Flor de Durazno (Peach Blossom) - his first commercial success. He was elected to the Argentine Chamber of Deputies in 1916 as a Conservative and received the National Literary Prize for his realist novel, Desierto de piedra (Stone Desert), but he was also known for his antisemitism - established with his inflammatory Oro (Gold) - and his ideological association with French "integrisme," a Catholic nationalist doctrine associated with the National Front.

He was appointed director of the National Library of Argentina in 1931, and in 1943, as Minister of Public Instruction for the newly installed military government of General Pedro Ramírez, he reinstated religious education in public schools, thus breaking from a sixty-year secular tradition in Argentine education.

A souring of relations with the Catholic Church on the part of President Juan Perón led to Wast's dismissal as National Library Director in 1955. The writer died in Buenos Aires in 1962.

== Works ==
- (1905). Alegre.
- (1907). Novia de Vacaciones.
- (1911). Flor de Durazno.
- (1914). Fuente Sellada.
- (1916). La Casa de los Cuervos.
- (1918). Valle Negro.
- (1919). Ciudad Turbulenta, Ciudad Alegre.
- (1920). La Corbata Celeste.
- (1921). Los Ojos Vendados.
- (1922). El Vengador.
- (1923). La que no Perdonó.
- (1924). Pata de Zorra.
- (1924). Una Estrella en la Ventana.
- (1925). Desierto de Piedra.
- (1926). Las Espigas de Ruth.
- (1926). El Jinete de Fuego.
- (1926). Myriam La Conspiradora.
- (1927). Tierra de Jaguares.
- (1927). Sangre en el Umbral.
- (1929). Lucía Miranda.
- (1930). 15 Dias Sacristán.
- (1930). El Camino de las Llamas.
- (1931). Vocacion de Escritor.
- (1931). Don Bosco y su Tiempo.
- (1935). El Kahal.
- (1935). Oro.
- (1935). Buenos Aires, Futura Babilonia.
- (1936). Naves, Oro, Sueños.
- (1941). El Sexto Sello.
- (1942). Juana Tabor.
- (1942). 666.
- (1944). Esperar Contra Toda Esperanza.
- (1945). Lo que Dios ha Unido.
- (1948). Alma Romana.
- (1948). Su Segunda Patria.
- (1952). Morir con las Botas Puestas.
- (1955). Estrella de la Tarde.
- (1960). Año X.
- (1963). Autobiografía del Hijito que no Nació.
- (1964). Navega Hacia Alta Mar.

Collected works

- (1942). Todas las Novelas de Hugo Wast.
- (1956-57). Obras Completas de Hugo Wast (2 vols.)

Works in English translation

- (1924). The House Of The Ravens.
- (1928). Black Valley.
- (1928). Stone Desert.
- (1929). Peach Blossom.
- (1930). The Strength of Lovers.
