= National Universitary Concentration =

National Universitary Concentration Concentración Nacional Universitaria
- Founded: 1971; 55 years ago
- Dissolved: 1976; 50 years ago
- Headquarters: Buenos Aires, Argentina
- Ideology: Fascism; Falangism; Anti-marxism; Anti-communism; Anti-capitalism; Orthodox Peronism
- Political position: Far-right

National Universitary Concentration (Spanish: Concentración Nacional Universitaria, abbrev. CNU) was a Third position terrorist group in Argentina. Founded in 1971, the CNU was based in the cities of Mar del Plata and La Plata. In complicity with the police and military, CNU carried out various murders and other acts of violence, which later legal proceedings considered to be the precursor of the Dirty War. According to its communique, the group adhered to Fascism and Peronism and dedicated itself to fighting Tendencia Revolucionaria and other leftist elements.

After the Argentine Anticommunist Alliance (also known as Triple A) was established in 1973, CNU was shortly incorporated into the now-infamous paramilitary before leaving in 1975, when Julio "Polaco" Dubchak was assassinated. When the government of Isabel Perón was overthrown on March 24, 1976, some CNU members began to cooperate with the extrajudicial task forces organized by the 1976-83 military dictatorship. A total of over 50 murders and other acts of violence have been attributed to the National Universitary Concentration. The group's main leaders were Carlos Alberto Disandro [es], Patricio Fernández Rivero, Ernesto Piantoni, Raúl Viglizzo, Gustavo Demarchi and Héctor Corres.

== Beginning ==
During the military dictatorship of General Juan Carlos Onganía, police arrested three young men affiliated to the terrorist group Tacuara Nationalist Movement in Mar del Plata in 1963. The three arrested were 18-year-old Federico Delgado, 22-year-old Carlos Gómez, and 25-year-old Ernesto Piantoni. The policed seized materials that could be used to make firecrackers to disrupt the scheduled speech of Bishop Jerónimo Podestá the next day. Bishop Podestá had strong ties to Peronism and liberation theology (a synthesis of Christian theology and far-left, especially Marxist, politics) and was at odds with dictator Onganía at that time.

Tacuara was an umbrella group of various Peronist resistance movements, from third position to far-left, against the governments that had been in power after the overthrow of Juan Perón in 1955. In 1963, the group was on the verge of collapse because of unsettled ideological differences among members. The three young men arrested, Delgado, Gomez, and Piantoni, and some other Tacuara members were dissatisfied with the leftist tendencies exhibited by some Tacuara factions and found ideological belonging in Carlos Alberto Disandro [es], a National University of La Plata professor who espoused Fascism, antisemitism, and a version of Christianity against the Second Vatican Council.

The Tacuara dissidents founded a new terrorist group around Disandro in the Alberti Theater in Mar del Plata and named it National Universitary Concentration (Spanish: Concentración Nacional Universitaria). The main leaders were Delgado, Piantoni, and law students Raúl Viglizzo and Oscar Héctor Corres. Corres was also part of the police force and served as a link between Disandro and Patricio Fernández Rivero, head of the CNU in La Plata. The organization had ties to union leaders including José Ignacio Rucci and Lorenzo Miguel. On November 20, 1971, the anniversary of the Battle of Vuelta de Obligado, CNU held a demonstration in Mar del Plata, where they burned desks, dropped Molotov cocktails, and smashed shop windows.

== Murder of Silvia Filler ==
CNU carried out its first murder on December 6, 1971, when Silvia Filler [es], a 17-year-old student at Mariano Moreno National College, was shot on the campus of the National University of Mar del Plata. A court ruled that 20 CNU members were responsible for Filler's death. They were prosecuted but not convicted. The 1973 amnesty law allowed for their release.

== Incorporation into state apparatus ==
After the collapse of the Argentine Revolution dictatorship, the democratically elected government of Héctor José Cámpora assumed power on May 25, 1973. A coalition of various political groups, Cámpora's government worked to replace the personnel that the military dictatorship had appointed in command of Argentine state institutions (universities, hospitals, media, etc.). In the process, CNU was incorporated into the government apparatus to carry out state terrorism. In Mar del Plata, CNU and the Nationalist Liberation Alliance took over radio station Radio Atlántica [es] and gave it to General Juan José Valle.

On June 20, 1973, the Ezeiza massacre marked the start of a decade characterized by state terrorism against the Peronist left. Two months later, the leftist Peronist Armed Forces (abbrev. FAP) murdered Marcelino Mansilla [es], a Mar del Plata union leader. The FAP claimed that the assassination of Mansilla, who had strong ties to the CNU, was a reprisal for Silvia Filler's death.

== Investigation and Trial ==
In 2008, CNU leaders were tried on Crimes against Humanity. Demarchi fled to Colombia and filed for asylum, but was soon denied asylum and extradited to Argentina in 2013.
