= Ezeiza massacre =

1973 shooting at a Peronist rally in Buenos Aires, Argentina

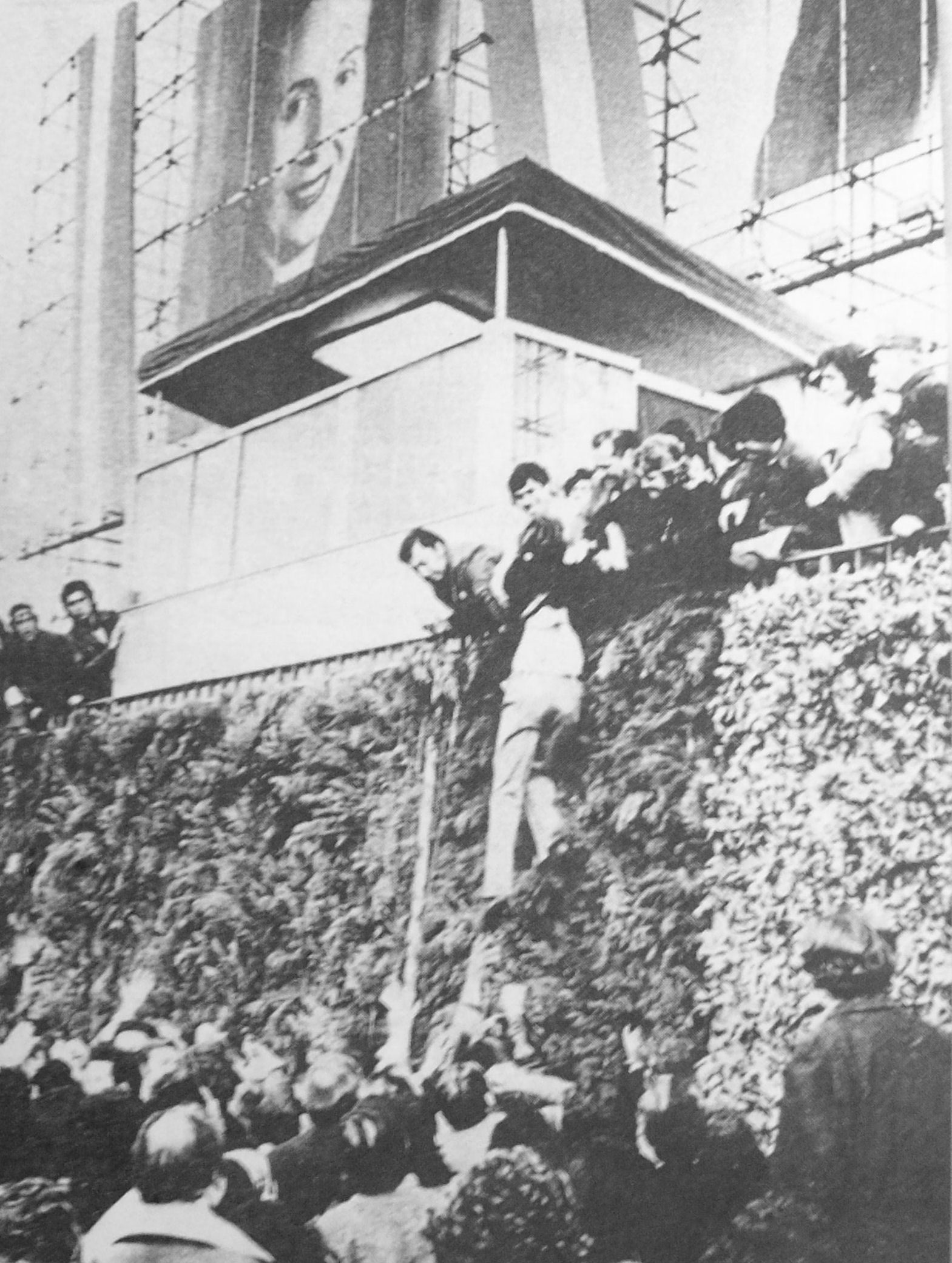
- A person being pulled up on the platform where Perón would have spoken.
- Location: 34.722438°S 58.513419°W; Puente 12, 10 km on the access road from Ezeiza International Airport, Buenos Aires, Argentina
- Date: June 20, 1973; 53 years ago
- Target: Left-wing Peronist masses
- Attack type: Sniper massacre
- Weapon: Sniper rifles
- Deaths: 13 (at least)
- Injuries: 365 (at least)
- Perpetrator: Orthodox Peronism

The Ezeiza massacre (Spanish pronunciation: [eˈsejsa]) took place on June 20, 1973, at Puente 12, the intersection of General Ricchieri freeway (the Ezeiza Airport access) and Camino de Cintura (provincial route 4), some 10 km from Ezeiza International Airport in Buenos Aires, Argentina.

Peronist masses, including many young people, had gathered there to acclaim Juan Perón's definitive return from an 18-year exile in Spain. The police estimated three and a half million people had gathered at the airport. In his plane, Perón was accompanied by president Héctor Cámpora, a representative of Peronism's left wing, who had come to power on May 25, 1973, amid popular euphoria and a period of political turmoil. Cámpora was opposed to the Peronist right wing, declaring during his first speech that "the spilled blood will not be negotiated".

From Perón's platform, camouflaged snipers from the right wing of Peronism opened fire on the crowd. The left-wing Peronist Youth and the Montoneros were targeted and trapped. At least 13 bodies were subsequently identified, and 365 were injured during the massacre.

According to Clarín newspaper, the real number is thought to be much higher. No official investigation was ever performed to confirm these higher estimates.

== Causes ==
The differences between orthodox Peronism and the Peronist left were irreconcilable, especially after on 2 June 1973 José Ignacio Rucci, Secretary General of the CGT (Confederación General del Trabajo), declared that they were "against left-wing imperialisms".

== People involved ==
The Ezeiza massacre marked the end of the alliance of left- and right-wing Peronists which Perón had managed to form. Héctor Cámpora represented the main figure of the left wing, and José López Rega, a former federal police officer and Perón's personal secretary who had accompanied Perón during his exile in Francoist Spain, was the right wing's representative. López Rega would also be the founder of the Alianza Anticomunista Argentina right-wing death squad.

A populist and a nationalist, Perón was popular from the far-left to the far-right, but this conjunction of forces ended that day. During his exile, Perón himself had supported both young left-wing Peronists, whose icons included Che Guevara, the Montoneros, Fuerzas Armadas Revolucionarias (FAR), Fuerzas Armadas Peronistas (FAP), the Peronist Youth (JP) and right-wing Peronists composed "Special Formations", gathering radicals such as the Iron Guard (GH) or the Movimiento Nacionalista Tacuara.

The tribune had been set up at Puente 12 by Lieutenant-Colonel Jorge Manuel Osinde and other far-right figures of Peronism, such as Alberto Brito Lima and Norma Kennedy. Lorenzo Miguel, Juan Manuel Abal Medina and José Ignacio Rucci, general secretary of the CGT — controlled by the Peronist right wing – had the responsibility of organizing the Peronists' mobilization to Ezeiza. Members of the Unión Obrera Metalúrgica trade union, the Juventud sindical peronista and other right-wing sectors were also on Perón's tribune, facing the left-wing groups in the crowds (FAR, Montoneros, JP and others — the FAP had disarmed on May 25, 1973).

Italian terrorist Stefano Delle Chiaie, who worked in Operation Gladio but also maintained links with the Chilean DINA and Turkish Grey Wolves member Abdullah Çatlı, was also present at Ezeiza, according to investigations by Spanish judge Baltasar Garzón. Carlos "El Indio" Castillo, member of the Concentración Nacionalista Universitaria (CNU), also took part in the massacre.

== Political context ==
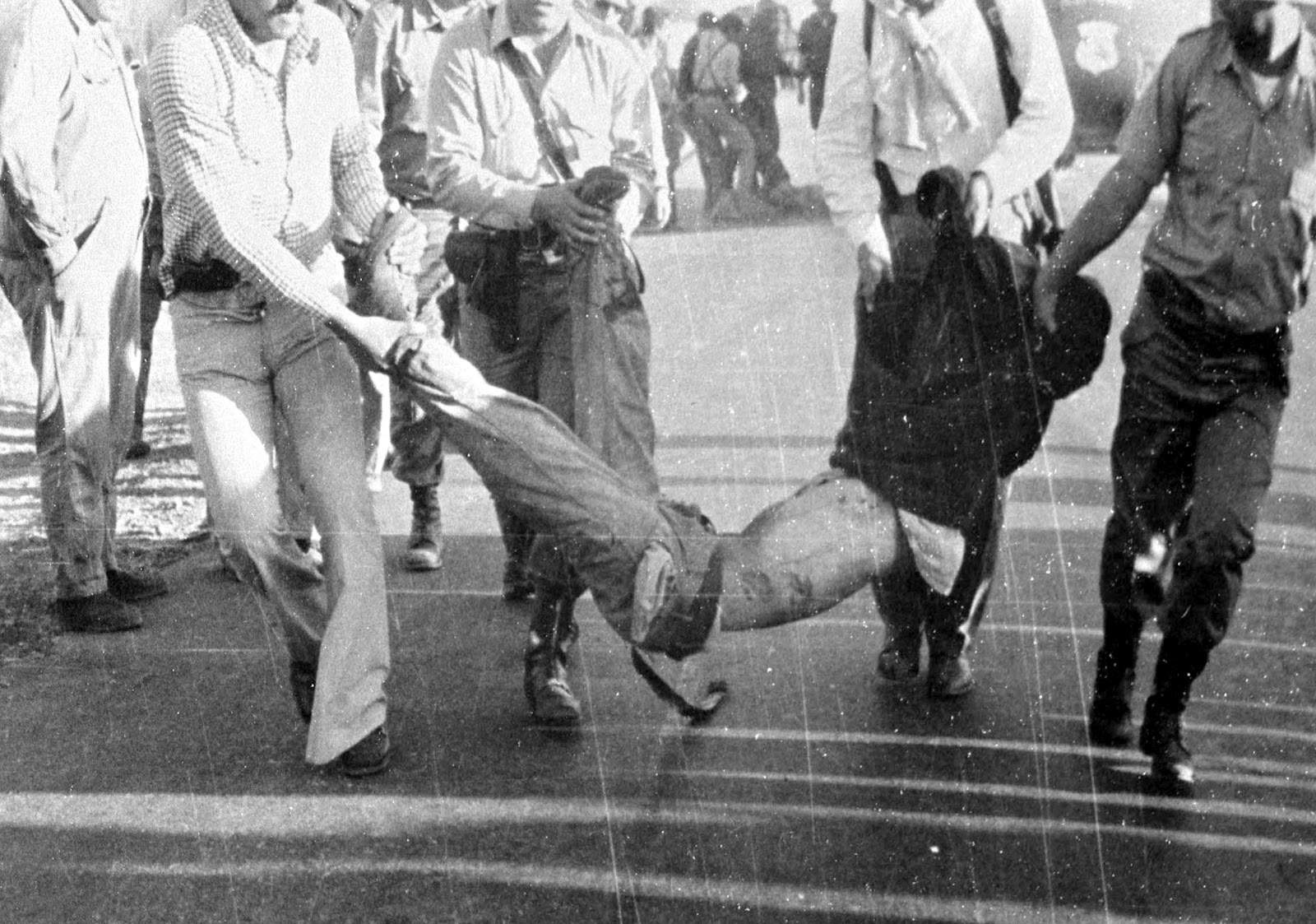
A fallen victim of the massacre being carried.

The massacre had been planned to effect the removal of president Héctor Cámpora, a moderate of the left wing, from power. During Cámpora's first month of governing, approximately 600 social conflicts, strikes and factory occupations had taken place. Workers managed to obtain wage increases and better working conditions. The workers' movement had gathered the sympathy of large sectors, sometimes anti-Peronist, of the middle classes. On June 2, 1973, José Ignacio Rucci, general secretary of the CGT, had responded to a Cuban delegate to the CGT congress asking for a toast in honour of Che Guevara, that they were against left-wing imperialism. The Peronist right wing gradually took control of the whole of the trade union organization, placing people close to the leader José Ignacio Rucci.

== Effects ==
The Ezeiza massacre marked the end of the transition period of Cámpora, who had succeeded the military dictatorship of general Alejandro Lanusse. According to Hugo Moreno, "if October 17, 1945 may be considered as the founding act of Peronism, by the general strike and the presence of the masses imposing their will of support to Perón, the June 20, 1973 massacre marks the entrance on the scene of the late right-wing Peronism."

== See also ==
- List of massacres in Argentina
- 2001 Massacre of Plaza de Mayo
- Montejurra massacre
