= People's Countryside Party =

Political party in Argentina

People's Countryside Party Partido del Campo Popular
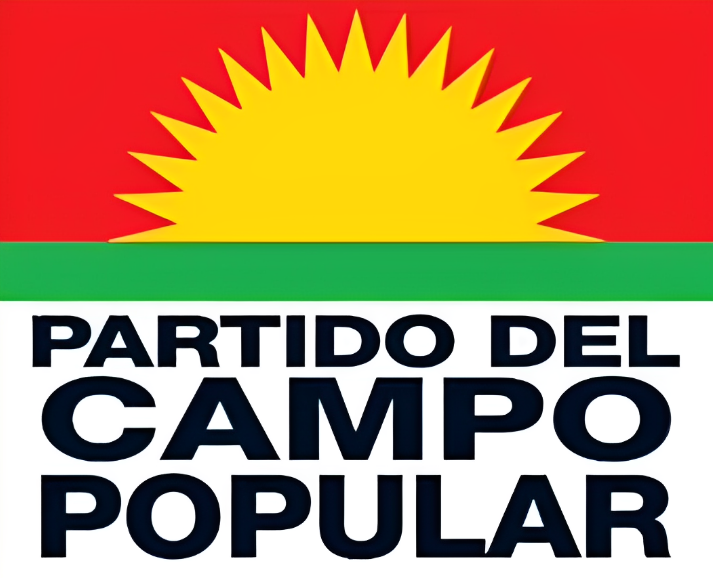
- Leader: José Alejandro Bonacci
- Founded: 2010
- Dissolved: 2017
- Merger of: Movement for Dignity and Independence; Movimiento Patriótico de Córdoba
- Succeeded by: Unite por la Libertad y la Dignidad
- Headquarters: Rosario (Junta Electoral Nacional)
- Ideology: Nationalism; Orthodox Peronism
- Political position: Far-right

Website
- http://www.pcp.org.ar/

The People's Countryside Party (Spanish: Partido del Campo Popular, PCP) was an Argentinean political party founded in 2010. The party was formed by the union of the Movement for Dignity and Independence (Modin, active in Buenos Aires and San Luis) founded by the carapintada Aldo Rico and the regional Patriotic Movement of Cordoba party.

== Political activity ==
The PCP is recognized as a district-level party by the National's Electoral Chamber in Buenos Aires and in the province of Santa Fe. This party was also politically active in Buenos Aires, Misiones, Formosa, San Luis and Cordoba. The PCP was present in two national elections (2009 and 2011) and in several province elections.

== History ==
In 2010, the PCP districts of Santa Fe and Capital Federal were integrated with the Movement for Dignity and Independence (Modin, active in Buenos Aires and San Luis) founded by the carapintada Aldo Rico and the regional Patriotic Movement of Cordoba. The possible union with Social Alternative, chaired by Mario Puértolas was not possible due to juridic and political reasons. The Social Alternative party took part in the Buenos Aires autonomic city elections with its own candidates, while the PCP integrated the Citizens Front. For the 2011 elections, the party launched a political platform known as New Democracy and presented José Bonacci as presidential candidate. In the primary elections the formula Bonacci-Villena obtained 0.24% of the vote (without reaching the 1.5% threshold required by the law to participate in the general elections).

== Ideology ==
In its doctrinal basis, the party has popular nationalism as a resistance against globalization. According to its program for the 2011 elections the party rejects the actual democracies in which “the political parties are mere advertisement agencies”. In July 2011, PCP candidates for representatives visited the Seprin company where they declared: “Our party has as a cornerstone combat against drug traffic, defense of our nation, respect for our country institutions, in particular the Army, the security forces and the church so much discredited by the stateless people that nowadays govern us. And, most importantly, is that we defend the family to the maximum”. On August 1, facing accusations of being a radical party, the PCP released a statement saying that “there are no agreements, alliances or political relations with the Social Alternative Party from the Argentinean Federal District. The PCP also has not joined this party due to the political and juridic failure of the conversations and the ideological differences with the mentioned party. We endorse the need to go deeper into the democracy, as the actual model is limited and enclosed, but we are not a xenophobic or restrictive group and our ideology is based on popular nationalism and democracy.” By mistake it was published that José Bonacci, the PCP leader, is under investigation for the falsification of approximately 2000 signatures of young people to make them appear as affiliated with his party in order to enter the elections. Rosario 3 agreed that it provided wrong information. Nevertheless, the newspaper "La Capital de Rosario" did not publish the requested rectification of the defamation.
