= 2009 Argentine legislative election =

- 28 June 2009
- Chamber of Deputies
- 127 of the 257 seats in the Chamber of Deputies
- Turnout: 74.35%
Party	Vote %	Seats	+/–
Social and Civic Agreement	30.21	42	+7
Front for Victory	29.89	42	−41
Federal Peronism / PRO Union	27.26	34	+24
Proyecto Sur	2.86	4	+3
New Encounter	2.12	2	+2
Neuquén People's Movement	0.40	2	+1
Fuegian Federal Party	0.06	1	+1
This lists parties that won seats. See the complete results below.
- Senate
- 24 of the 72 seats in the Senate
- Turnout: 74.18%
Party	Vote %	Seats	+/–
Social and Civic Agreement	45.09	14	+8
Federal Peronism / PRO Union	25.36	4	+4
Front for Victory	20.01	6	−11
This lists parties that won seats. See the complete results below.
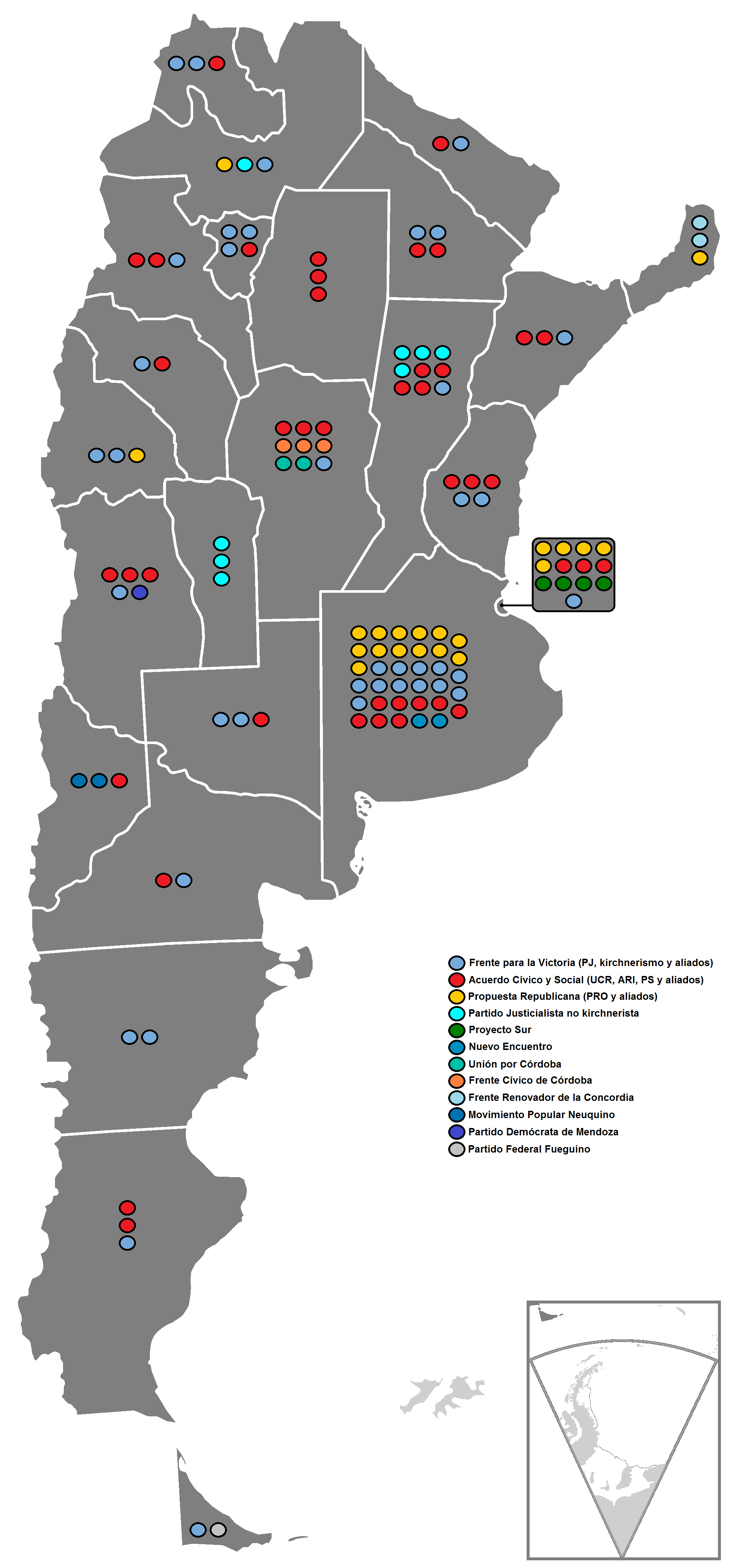
Chamber of Deputies results by province

Legislative elections were held in Argentina for half the seats in the Chamber of Deputies and a third (24) of the seats in the Senate on 28 June 2009, as well as for the legislature of the City of Buenos Aires and other municipalities.

== Background ==
The elections were due to have been held on 25 October 2009. In March 2009, the Mayor of Buenos Aires, Mauricio Macri, moved to bring forward the date of elections to the Buenos Aires City Legislature to June 28, saying that it would increase transparency and democratic quality. Opposition figures criticised the decision, suggesting Macri was attempting to consolidate his power in the city, and building the career of his deputy, Gabriela Michetti, expected to head the list for Macri's coalition in the election. Similar changes to the election date had been introduced in the provinces of Santa Fe and Catamarca (March 2009).

Despite the criticism by politicians from Government ranks that Macri had abused the process by unilaterally changing the election date, President Cristina Fernández de Kirchner announced that she too would be introducing legislation to move the date of national elections forward by four months, to June 28. Despite great debate and the defections of some Peronist legislators, the proposal passed its Congressional stages quickly and the date was successfully changed. The Government claimed it would allow politicians to leave behind campaigning priorities and focus on tackling the ongoing local effect of the international financial crisis. Equally controversial was a decision by Front for Victory leader Néstor Kirchner (the current President's husband and predecessor) to advance stand-in candidates - prominent local lawmakers (notably Buenos Aires Province Governor Daniel Scioli, as well as 15 Greater Buenos Aires-area mayors) who, after the election, would be likely to cede their new seats to down-ticket names.

The elections resulted in a setback for the governing, center-left Front for Victory and its allies, which lost their absolute majorities in both houses of Congress. Former President Néstor Kirchner stood as head of his party list in the important Buenos Aires Province. Kirchner's list was defeated, however, by the center-right Republican Proposal (PRO) list headed by businessman Francisco de Narváez; the loss in Buenos Aires Province, though narrow, is significant as the province has been considered a Peronist stronghold and had helped maintain Kirchnerism as the dominant force in Argentine politics since 2003. Buenos Aires Vice Mayor Gabriela Michetti stood as head of the PRO list for the Lower House, and defeated four other prominent parties; the evening's surprise in Buenos Aires, however, was that of filmmaker Fernando Solanas' left-wing Proyecto Sur, which obtained second place.

The Kirchners' leading opposition on the center-left, the Civic Coalition, also made significant gains – particularly in the Senate, where they gained 7 seats. The Front for Victory had already lost 16 Lower House members and 4 Senators on the heels of the 2008 Argentine government conflict with the agricultural sector over a proposed rise in export tariffs. The crisis was defused by Vice President Julio Cobos' surprise, tie-breaking vote against them on July 16, 2008; but fallout from the controversy led to the President's distancing from Cobos (who successfully supported his own party list in his native Mendoza Province), a sharp drop in presidential approval ratings, and the aforementioned congressional defections. One especially successful ex-Kirchnerist was Santa Fe Province Senator Carlos Reutemann, who after the agrarian conflict formed Santa Fe Federal. His new party narrowly bested local Socialist Party leader Rubén Giustiniani, who would garner one of Santa Fe's three Senate seats. The Front for Victory retained a plurality in both houses, however (they will, with two allies, be one seat short of an absolute majority in the Senate).

== Results ==
=== Chamber of Deputies ===
Party or alliance		Votes	%	Seats	Total seats
Social and Civic Agreement	Social and Civic Agreement	3,049,255	15.54	23	77
Social and Civic Agreement	Progressive, Civic and Social Front	672,351	3.43	4	77
Social and Civic Agreement	Radical Civic Union	650,138	3.31	4	77
Social and Civic Agreement	Civic Front of Córdoba	468,918	2.39	3	77
Social and Civic Agreement	Civic Federal Front	423,022	2.16	3	77
Social and Civic Agreement	Frente de Todos	154,873	0.79	1	77
Social and Civic Agreement	Socialist Party	147,373	0.75	0	77
Social and Civic Agreement	Encuentro por Corrientes	142,086	0.72	1	77
Social and Civic Agreement	Civic Coalition ARI	82,711	0.42	0	77
Social and Civic Agreement	Consensus for Development	76,133	0.39	1	77
Social and Civic Agreement	Let's Change to Grow	53,209	0.27	2	77
Social and Civic Agreement	Progressive Project	5,769	0.03	0	77
Social and Civic Agreement	La Rioja Civic Front	1,070	0.01	0	77
Social and Civic Agreement	Total	5,926,908	30.21	42	77
Front for Victory	Front for Victory	4,215,047	21.49	26	125
Front for Victory	Justicialist Party	247,385	1.26	3	125
Front for Victory	Justicialist Front	384,385	1.96	3	125
Front for Victory	Chaco Deserves More	257,147	1.31	2	125
Front for Victory	Front for the Renewal of Concord	212,621	1.08	2	125
Front for Victory	Civic Front for Santiago	194,537	0.99	3	125
Front for Victory	Integration Front	132,818	0.68	2	125
Front for Victory	Corrientes for Change Front	111,508	0.57	1	125
Front for Victory	Salta Renewal Party	32,342	0.16	0	125
Front for Victory	Union of Neuquinos – Broad Front	24,496	0.12	0	125
Front for Victory	More San Luis Vocation	24,327	0.12	0	125
Front for Victory	Union for Jujuy	6,214	0.03	0	125
Front for Victory	Broad Front (Frente Amplio)	5,900	0.03	0	125
Front for Victory	Federalist Unity Party	5,025	0.03	0	125
Front for Victory	Broad Front (Frente Grande)	4,910	0.03	0	125
Front for Victory	Life and Commitment Movement	4,138	0.02	0	125
Front for Victory	Plural Consensus	621	0.00	0	125
Front for Victory	Intransigent Party	468	0.00	0	125
Front for Victory	Total	5,863,889	29.89	42	125
Federal Peronism–PRO Union	PRO Union	2,948,458	15.03	15	44
Federal Peronism–PRO Union	Federal Santa Fe	673,382	3.43	4	44
Federal Peronism–PRO Union	Republican Proposal	567,695	2.89	5	44
Federal Peronism–PRO Union	Union for Córdoba	428,902	2.19	2	44
Federal Peronism–PRO Union	Frente Es Posible	199,153	1.02	3	44
Federal Peronism–PRO Union	Federal Front	115,395	0.59	1	44
Federal Peronism–PRO Union	We are All Salta	83,270	0.42	1	44
Federal Peronism–PRO Union	Justicialist Party (La Pampa)	67,071	0.34	2	44
Federal Peronism–PRO Union	Union for San Juan	60,796	0.31	1	44
Federal Peronism–PRO Union	Dissident Popular Front	50,553	0.26	0	44
Federal Peronism–PRO Union	Jujuy First Front	45,873	0.23	0	44
Federal Peronism–PRO Union	Popular Action Movement	26,779	0.14	0	44
Federal Peronism–PRO Union	Tucumán Labor Party	23,212	0.12	0	44
Federal Peronism–PRO Union	Live Entre Ríos	11,677	0.06	0	44
Federal Peronism–PRO Union	Lealtad y Dignidad	11,478	0.06	0	44
Federal Peronism–PRO Union	Union for Santiago Front	9,611	0.05	0	44
Federal Peronism–PRO Union	Popular Action Movement	7,253	0.04	0	44
Federal Peronism–PRO Union	Partido Es Posible	6,772	0.03	0	44
Federal Peronism–PRO Union	Proposal for Change	5,917	0.03	0	44
Federal Peronism–PRO Union	Federal Catamarca Front	4,591	0.02	0	44
Federal Peronism–PRO Union	Total	5,347,838	27.26	34	44
Proyecto Sur	Proyecto Sur	448,711	2.29	4	5
Proyecto Sur	Authentic Socialist Party	67,280	0.34	0	5
Proyecto Sur	Freemen of the South Movement	44,112	0.22	0	5
Proyecto Sur	Total	560,103	2.86	4	5
New Encounter		415,961	2.12	2	2
Workers' Party		230,274	1.17	0	0
Workers' Left Front	Workers' Left Front	149,994	0.76	0	0
Workers' Left Front	Socialist Workers' Party	26,524	0.14	0	0
Workers' Left Front	Popular Left Consensus	11,376	0.06	0	0
Workers' Left Front	Socialist Left	1,367	0.01	0	0
Workers' Left Front	Total	189,261	0.96	0	0
MST–MIJD	Workers' Socialist Movement	77,170	0.39	0	0
MST–MIJD	Independent Movement of Retirees and Unemployed	39,976	0.20	0	0
MST–MIJD	Total	117,146	0.60	0	0
Neuquén People's Movement		78,703	0.40	2	3
Federal Movement of Retirees – Popular Movement for Reconquest		61,651	0.31	0	0
Integration and Development Movement	Front for Change	16,699	0.09	0	0
Integration and Development Movement	Unity for Change Front	16,005	0.08	0	0
Integration and Development Movement	Hope Front	15,493	0.08	0	0
Integration and Development Movement	Integration and Development Movement	9,582	0.05	0	0
Integration and Development Movement	Total	57,779	0.29	0	0
Dialogue for the City		57,577	0.29	0	0
Republican Force		57,520	0.29	0	0
PCP–UNIR–MODIN	PCP–UNIR–MODIN	37,850	0.19	0	0
PCP–UNIR–MODIN	People's Countryside Party	5,573	0.03	0	0
PCP–UNIR–MODIN	MODIN – Communal Party	3,509	0.02	0	0
PCP–UNIR–MODIN	Federal Independent Coalition – Federal Encounter for Unity	3,192	0.02	0	0
PCP–UNIR–MODIN	Porteño Consensus – Idear	2,589	0.01	0	0
PCP–UNIR–MODIN	Total	117,146	0.60	0	0
PH–PC	Humanist Party	16,824	0.09	0	0
PH–PC	Communist Party	16,350	0.08	0	0
PH–PC	Popular and Social Front	9,925	0.05	0	0
PH–PC	Popular Front	3,775	0.02	0	0
PH–PC	Popular Encounter	5,616	0.03	0	0
PH–PC	Total	117,146	0.60	0	0
People's Reconstruction Party		43,188	0.22	0	0
Self-determination and Freedom		37,507	0.19	0	0
Retirees in Action		29,491	0.15	0	0
Christian Democratic Party	Christian Democratic Party	16,898	0.09	0	0
Christian Democratic Party	Popular Civic Front	10,877	0.06	0	0
Christian Democratic Party	Total	27,775	0.14	0	0
New Civic Union		27,561	0.14	0	0
Call for Citizen Integration		26,079	0.13	0	0
Autonomist Party of Corrientes		25,260	0.13	0	0
Open Politics for Social Integrity		24,448	0.12	0	0
New People		22,307	0.11	0	0
Encounter for Córdoba		20,114	0.10	0	0
United People's Front		19,660	0.10	0	0
Chubut Action Party		19,088	0.10	0	0
Renewal Party		18,633	0.09	0	0
Alliance with Consciousness – Solidary Will		18,351	0.09	0	0
Fuegian Federal Party		12,653	0.06	1	1
Christians' Authentic Party		12,613	0.06	0	0
Retirees Front		12,416	0.06	0	0
Citizen Dignity		11,762	0.06	0	0
Citizen Encounter		9,355	0.05	0	0
Everybody for Neuquén		9,141	0.05	0	0
Popular Party		8,100	0.04	0	0
Green Initiative for Buenos Aires		8,072	0.04	0	0
Popular Unity Movement		7,787	0.04	0	0
Autonomist Party		7,523	0.04	0	0
Democratic Party of Córdoba		7,353	0.04	0	0
Mendoza Deserves More		6,576	0.03	0	0
Popular Concentration		6,397	0.03	0	0
Independent Renewal Movement		6,392	0.03	0	0
United Left		5,699	0.03	0	0
Together for Mendoza		5,534	0.03	0	0
Do for Tierra del Fuego		5,078	0.03	0	0
Socialist Convergence		4,195	0.02	0	0
Party for Independent Solidarity Action in Buenos Aires		4,081	0.02	0	0
United People		3,626	0.02	0	0
Will for Integration and Authentic Development		3,576	0.02	0	0
Union of the Democratic Centre		3,262	0.02	0	0
Party of the City		3,259	0.02	0	0
Pampa Federalist Movement		3,205	0.02	0	0
Social Vanguard		3,203	0.02	0	0
New Generation		2,782	0.01	0	0
United Provinces Movement		2,723	0.01	0	0
Federal Party		2,578	0.01	0	0
Social Alternative		2,567	0.01	0	0
Fueguian People's Movement		2,242	0.01	0	0
People's Assembly for Socialism and Freedom		1,972	0.01	0	0
Provincial Renewal Commitment		976	0.00	0	0
Total Space		728	0.00	0	0
Total		19,616,701	100.00	127	257
Valid votes		19,616,701	94.43		
Invalid votes		352,549	1.70		
Blank votes		805,090	3.88		
Total votes		20,774,340	100.00		
Registered voters/turnout		27,942,194	74.35		
Source: DINE, Ministry of the Interior

==== Results by province ====
Province	ACyS			FPV			Federal Peronism/PRO			Others		
Province	Votes	%	Seats	Votes	%	Seats	Votes	%	Seats	Votes	%	Seats
Buenos Aires	1,613,037	21.46	8	2,418,725	32.18	12	2,667,127	35.49	13	816,404	10.86	2
Buenos Aires City	391,206	21.50	3	211,277	11.61	1	572,085	31.43	5	645,339	35.46	4
Catamarca	58,758	38.96	2	50,489	33.47	1	31,370	20.80	—	10,217	6.77	—
Chaco	229,045	44.48	2	257,147	49.93	2	—	—	—	28,789	5.59	—
Chubut	59,948	25.18	—	132,818	55.80	2	—	—	—	45,272	19.02	—
Córdoba	954,014	57.09	6	151,753	9.08	1	448,544	26.84	2	116,805	6.99	—
Corrientes	296,959	68.47	2	111,508	25.71	1	—	—	—	25,260	5.82	—
Entre Ríos	268,210	40.62	3	231,899	35.12	2	125,740	19.04	—	34,406	5.21	—
Formosa	81,126	35.67	1	146,328	64.33	1	—	—	—	—	—	—
Jujuy	87,081	30.94	1	118,233	42.00	2	45,873	16.30	—	30,297	10.76	—
La Pampa	63,156	35.53	1	5,900	3.32	—	79,548	44.75	2	29,138	16.39	—
La Rioja	51,598	32.90	1	84,028	53.57	1	17,395	11.09	—	3,832	2.44	—
Mendoza	454,315	52.17	3	234,441	26.92	1	131,846	15.14	1	50,170	5.76	—
Misiones	51,867	11.74	—	286,104	64.76	2	81,186	18.38	1	22,653	5.13	—
Neuquén	82,224	30.82	1	59,293	22.22	—	9,457	3.54	—	115,815	43.41	2
Río Negro	163,295	58.99	1	86,957	31.41	1	—	—	—	26,566	9.60	—
Salta	23,763	4.85	—	206,625	42.14	1	198,665	40.52	2	61,229	12.49	—
San Juan	48,529	15.11	—	184,912	57.56	2	60,796	18.93	1	26,994	8.40	—
San Luis	53,539	27.66	—	30,969	16.00	—	102,149	52.76	3	6,939	3.58	—
Santa Cruz	53,209	42.57	2	51,427	41.14	1	—	—	—	20,360	16.29	—
Santa Fe	672,351	39.81	4	162,615	9.63	1	673,382	39.87	4	180,647	10.70	—
Santiago del Estero	42,623	13.66	—	243,488	78.04	3	9,611	3.08	—	16,275	5.22	—
Tierra del Fuego	14,873	24.42	—	15,844	26.01	1	—	—	—	30,197	49.57	1
Tucumán	112,182	15.56	1	381,109	52.87	3	93,064	12.91	—	134,462	18.65	—
Total	5,926,908	30.21	42	5,863,889	29.89	42	5,347,838	27.26	34	2,478,066	12.63	9

=== Senate ===
Party or alliance		Votes	%	Seats	Total seats
Social and Civic Agreement	Progressive, Civic and Social Front	693,766	11.59	1	23
Social and Civic Agreement	Civic Front of Córdoba	512,306	8.56	2	23
Social and Civic Agreement	Radical Civic Union	488,324	8.16	2	23
Social and Civic Agreement	Civic Federal Front	422,524	7.06	2	23
Social and Civic Agreement	Social and Civic Agreement	237,904	3.97	4	23
Social and Civic Agreement	Frente de Todos	152,854	2.55	2	23
Social and Civic Agreement	Encuentro por Corrientes	146,810	2.45	1	23
Social and Civic Agreement	Socialist Party – The Coalition	28,886	0.48	0	23
Social and Civic Agreement	Civic Coalition ARI	16,625	0.28	0	23
Social and Civic Agreement	Total	2,699,999	45.09	14	23
Federal Peronism / PRO Union	Federal Santa Fe	724,066	12.09	2	9
Federal Peronism / PRO Union	Union for Córdoba	436,940	7.30	0	9
Federal Peronism / PRO Union	Democratic–PRO Union Front	122,907	2.05	0	9
Federal Peronism / PRO Union	Federal PRO Union Front	71,846	1.20	0	9
Federal Peronism / PRO Union	Justicialist Party	69,616	1.16	2	9
Federal Peronism / PRO Union	Frente Es Posible	30,320	0.51	0	9
Federal Peronism / PRO Union	Popular Action Movement	27,125	0.45	0	9
Federal Peronism / PRO Union	Tucumán Labor Party	24,646	0.41	0	9
Federal Peronism / PRO Union	Partido Es Posible	6,801	0.11	0	9
Federal Peronism / PRO Union	Federal Catamarca Front	4,447	0.07	0	9
Federal Peronism / PRO Union	Total	1,518,714	25.36	4	9
Front for Victory	Front for Victory	947,878	15.83	4	39
Front for Victory	Integration Front	133,758	2.23	2	39
Front for Victory	Corrientes for Change Front	110,857	1.85	0	39
Front for Victory	Broad Front (Frente Amplio)	5,546	0.09	0	39
Front for Victory	Total	1,198,039	20.01	6	39
Proyecto Sur	Authentic Socialist Party	50,745	0.85	0	0
Proyecto Sur	Freemen of the South Movement	13,111	0.22	0	0
Proyecto Sur	Total	63,856	1.07	0	0
Workers' Party		59,683	1.00	0	0
Republican Force		58,300	0.97	0	0
Workers' Left Front	Workers' Left Front	33,430	0.56	0	0
Workers' Left Front	Socialist Workers' Party	17,522	0.29	0	0
Workers' Left Front	Total	50,952	0.85	0	0
People's Countryside Party–UNIR–MODIN		36,655	0.61	0	0
Workers' Socialist Movement		36,094	0.60	0	0
Autonomist Party of Corrientes		27,855	0.47	0	0
New People		23,840	0.40	0	0
Open Politics for Social Integrity		22,489	0.38	0	0
Integration and Development Movement	Unity for Change Front	14,262	0.24	0	0
Integration and Development Movement	Integration and Development Movement	7,613	0.13	0	0
Integration and Development Movement	Total	21,875	0.37	0	0
Encounter for Córdoba		20,329	0.34	0	0
Chubut Action Party		19,494	0.33	0	0
United People's Front		18,865	0.32	0	0
Alliance with Consciousness – Solidary Will		18,109	0.30	0	0
Retirees Front		11,904	0.20	0	0
Christian Democratic Party		11,459	0.19	0	0
Democratic Party of Córdoba		7,490	0.13	0	0
Popular Unity Movement		7,479	0.12	0	0
Autonomist Party		7,397	0.12	0	0
Mendoza Deserves More		7,201	0.12	0	0
Independent Renewal Movement		6,109	0.10	0	0
Popular Concentration		5,957	0.10	0	0
Together for Mendoza		5,504	0.09	0	0
United Left		5,386	0.09	0	0
Humanist Party		4,807	0.08	0	0
United People		3,494	0.06	0	0
Pampa Federalist Movement		3,071	0.05	0	0
Independence Party		2,792	0.05	0	0
Federal Party		2,492	0.04	0	0
Neuquén People's Movement					1
Total		5,987,690	100.00	24	72
Valid votes		5,987,690	95.01		
Invalid votes		123,862	1.97		
Blank votes		190,510	3.02		
Total votes		6,302,062	100.00		
Registered voters/turnout		8,495,430	74.18		
Source: DINE, Ministry of Interior

==== Results by province ====
Province	ACyS			Federal Peronism/PRO			FPV			Others		
Province	Votes	%	Seats	Votes	%	Seats	Votes	%	Seats	Votes	%	Seats
Catamarca	58,917	38.97	2	31,572	20.88	—	50,650	33.50	1	10,037	6.64	—
Chubut	59,101	24.73	1	—	—	—	133,758	55.98	2	46,099	19.29	—
Córdoba	958,154	57.32	3	455,537	27.25	—	146,163	8.74	—	111,713	6.68	—
Corrientes	299,664	68.36	3	—	—	—	110,857	25.29	—	27,855	6.35	—
La Pampa	62,550	34.78	1	81,339	45.23	2	5,546	3.08	—	30,405	16.91	—
Mendoza	451,410	52.12	2	129,708	14.98	—	235,962	27.25	1	48,961	5.65	—
Santa Fe	693,766	40.57	1	724,066	42.34	2	132,935	7.77	—	159,488	9.33	—
Tucumán	116,437	15.92	1	96,492	13.19	—	382,168	52.25	2	136,380	18.64	—
Total	2,699,999	45.09	14	1,518,714	25.36	4	1,198,039	20.01	6	570,938	9.54	0
