= Unite por la Libertad y la Dignidad =

Unite for Freedom and Dignity Unite por la Libertad y la Dignidad
- President: José Alejandro Bonacci
- Founder: José Alejandro Bonacci
- Legalised: June 13, 2017
- Preceded by: People's Countryside Party
- Headquarters: Buenos Aires, Argentina
- Ideology: Conservatism; Social conservatism Nationalism; Factions: Neo-fascism; Economic liberalism Neoliberalism; Orthodox Peronism
- Political position: Right-wing to far-right
- National affiliation: Patriotic Federal Front (2018); Frente Despertar (2019); La Libertad Avanza (2021–2023); Liber.Ar Front (since 2023)

Website
- http://www.unite.ar/index.php

Unite for Freedom and Dignity (Spanish: Unite por la Libertad y la Dignidad), or UNITE, is an Argentine right-wing conservative political party. It was founded in 2013 as a district party in the Province of Santa Fe, and in 2017 as a national party.

== History ==
=== 2018 ===
In 2018, José Alejandro Bonacci, president of the party, decided to form the ultranationalist Patriot Front, together with the Popular Country Party, Neighborhood Flag, and the People in Action party. They defined themselves as a nationalist alternative to the populist left and the liberal center-right. With disturbances in the party, the alliance would be dissolved, without being able to participate in any election.

=== 2019 ===
In 2019, UNITE formed the liberal alliance Frente Despertar, together with the Constitutional Nationalist Party-UNIR, the Union of the Democratic Center, and the Libertarian Party. After a sudden abandonment of the UNIR Party, to form part of Together for Change, the party would be the body through which the front candidates ran. They failed to register the alliance, because not all the parties maintained the requirements.

=== 2021 ===
In 2021, UNITE became part of the La Libertad Avanza alliance. In the City of Buenos Aires, it presented as a candidate for deputy the syncretic model Cinthia Fernández. The candidate did not pass the "PASO" elections.

== Proposals ==
=== Social action ===
- The State must guarantee decent housing, shelter, and food for each of its citizens.
- The State must provide a pension to the retired person or person with special needs, as well as unemployment insurance for job reintegration.
- The social action plans must be granted as part of a general plan of activities that contribute to self-sufficiency.
- The clientelistic use of funds destined for social assistance must be condemned.

=== International Relations and Defense ===
- Pacifism
- International cooperation
- Freedom of worship, and ethnic and cultural valuation.
- The State must guarantee national Defense, through its Armed Forces.
- The State must provide itself with the means of production for defense.

=== Environment ===
- The State must ensure the care of the environment, offering information on its preservation and obliging all individuals to preserve and defend it.
- Green spaces must be carefully protected.
- The State must guarantee the preservation of native species. It must also guarantee the prevention of all kinds of contamination and the treatment and recycling of industrial and domestic waste.
- The storage of nuclear waste of foreign production within the national territory must be condemned.

=== Media ===
- The State must guarantee free expression in communication, avoiding the foundation of monopolies.
- Access to the property of the media must be guaranteed to citizens and intermediary institutions.

=== Defender of life ===
- In defense of life from its conception to its natural end. Any legislation that undermines the right to life, such as abortion, euthanasia, or the death penalty, among others, must be rejected.

== Electoral results ==
=== Presidential elections ===
Year	Slate		Primaries		First round		Result
Year	President	Vice president	votes	%	votes	%	Position
2019	José Luis Espert	Luis Rosales	550.593	2.16%	394,206	1.47%	6th (not elected)
