= Iron Guard (disambiguation) =

Iron Guard may refer to:

- Iron Guard, common name of the interwar fascist movement and political party of Romania
  - Iron Guard death squads, death squads emerged from this organisation
- Iron Guard (Argentina), peronist Argentine political organisation
- Iron Guard of Egypt, secret interwar pro-Axis society and royalist political movement of Egypt
- Iron Guard of Palestine
