= Jorge Osinde =

Argentine military officer and politician

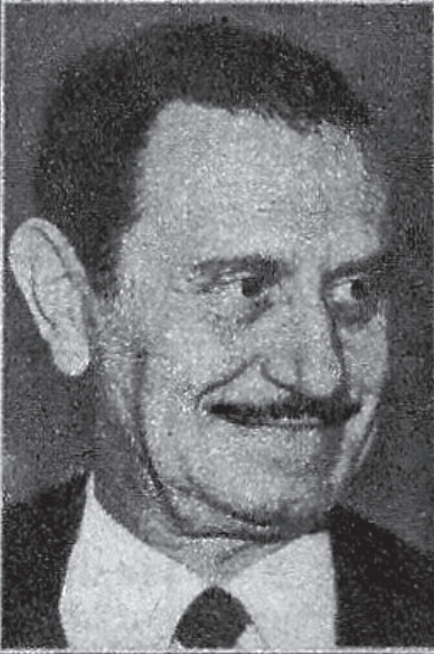
- Born: Jorge Manuel Osinde; Argentina
- Occupations: Military officer, politician
- Known for: Involvement in Ezeiza massacre

Jorge Manuel Osinde was an Argentine military officer and orthodox peronist politician.

== Life and career ==
Jorge Manuel Osinde graduated from the Colegio Militar de la Nación in 1934. Osinde specialized in military intelligence, and in 1943 received the official diploma of an Information Officer in the Argentine Army. He served in the Information Service of the army until 1947, when he was appointed by Juan Perón (then the president) to be the head of Federal Coordination. In 1954, he was assigned to the Army Information Service, where he reported directly to Perón.

After Perón was deposed in a coup in 1955, Pedro Eugenio Aramburu became de facto president and had Osinde incarcerated in Ushuaia, where he remained until being released by President Arturo Frondizi in 1958. Subsequently, Perón (who was in exile at the time) assigned Osinde a variety of tasks, such as searching for the body of Eva Perón, protecting Isabel Perón when she traveled to Argentina in 1964, and leading a failed attempt to return Perón himself to Argentina the same year.

After the March 1973 Argentine general election brought a Peronist government, Osinde was appointed Undersecretary of Sports, reporting to the Minister of Social Welfare José López Rega. On June 20, 1973, he was in charge of security at an event near the Aeropuerto de Ezeiza, organized to celebrate the return of Perón to Argentina after 18 years in exile. Osinde hired some 300 people to provide security, some of whom were armed with long guns; these hired guards were the perpetrators of the Ezeiza massacre. Historical consensus attributes partial or complete responsibility to Osinde for the massacre.

In May 1974 Osinde was designated Argentina's ambassador to Paraguay by Perón; he remained in the position until the 1976 Argentine coup d'état, after which he resigned.
