= Popular Dignity =

Popular Dignity Dignidad Popular
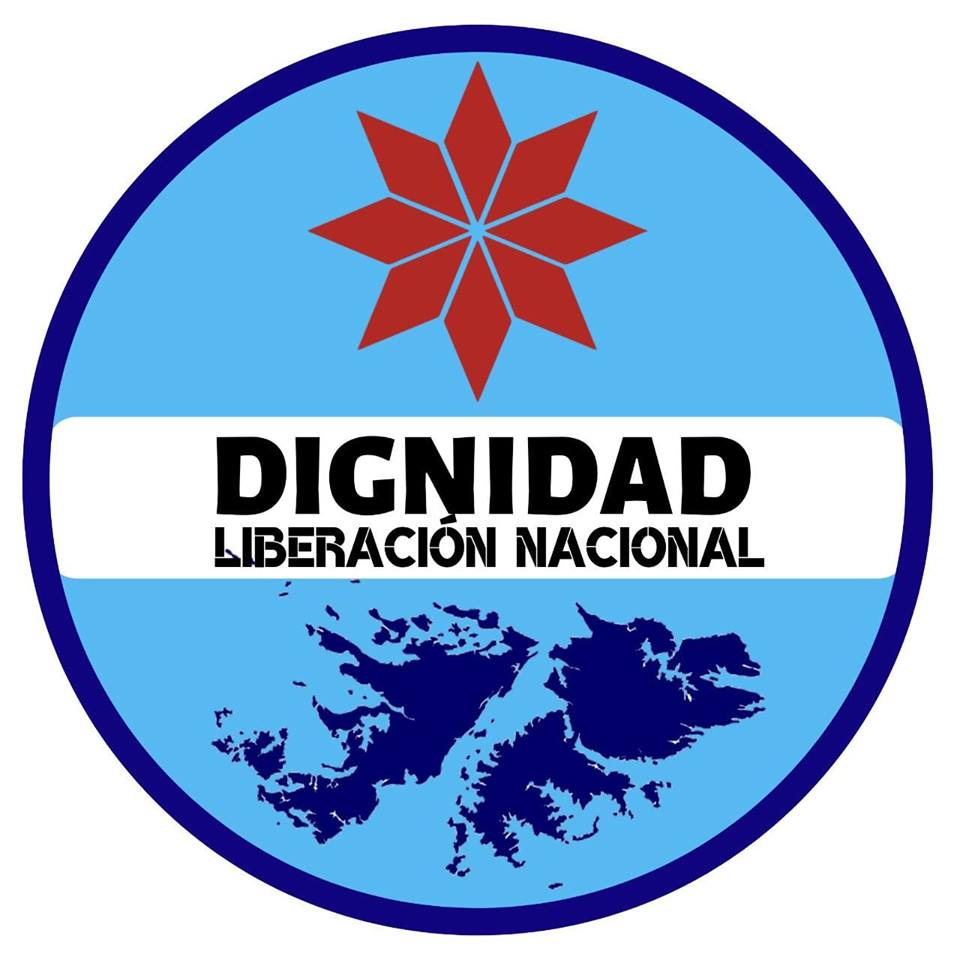
- Founder: Ernesto Raúl Habrá
- Founded: 17 September 2019 (Partido Dignidad Popular); 13 October 2022 (Dignidad Popular)
- Dissolved: 10 June 2022 (as a registered party)
- Split from: Justicialist Party
- Succeeded by: Encuentro Republicano Federal
- Headquarters: Buenos Aires
- Ideology: Orthodox Peronism; Neo-Nazism; Antisemitism; Anti-abortion
- Political position: Far-right
- National affiliation: Patriot Front
- Colours: Red
- Politics of Argentina; Political parties; Elections; logo used in the 2019 elections in CABA

Popular Dignity (Spanish: Dignidad Popular), also known as the Popular Dignity Party (Spanish: Partido Dignidad Popular), was a far-right and neo-Nazi political party founded by Ernesto Raúl Habrá in 2015 to compete in the Buenos Aires Province elections as a district party. By 2019, the group would cover several districts, thus becoming a national party.

== History ==
In 2017, the Popular Dignity Party tried to form a district alliance with the political party of the same style, the Popular Party. The National Electoral Chamber ratified a first instance ruling in which the judge Juan Manuel Culotta confirmed that the measure taken underlined the absence of official minutes and documents, with the respective signatures of party authorities, which would have confirmed their real and active existence. It stopped due to formal defects the payment of 72 million pesos to the Federal Union Front (name that the future front would bear) to finance the printing of ballots for the next Simultaneous and Mandatory Open Primaries (PASSED). This political coalition was considered as a typical "electoral SME", and had registered 26 lists, 13 for deputies and 13 for senators.

In 2019, the political group participated in the provincial elections in two districts without an alliance: in the province of Buenos Aires, in which it nominated Santiago Cuneo for governor, and in the city of Buenos Aires where they chose Leonardo Martínez Herrero as the city's head of government. The party failed to qualify for the general elections in any of its districts. In the presidential elections, they joined the far-right and neo-Nazi Patriot Front at the national level, and as a candidate nominated the neo-Nazi Alejandro Biondini.

In the 2021 Argentine legislative election, the party formed various district alliances, the majority of which were right-wing. In the province of Buenos Aires, they joined the right-wing libertarian front Avanza Libertad. In the city of Buenos Aires, as well as in the Mendoza Province, they joined the Patriot Front. In the Córdoba Province, they joined the far-right La Libertad Avanza. In the Catamarca Province, they joined the governative alliance Frente de Todos. In the Santiago del Estero Province, they joined the Labourist Patriotic Front.

=== Electoral justice fine for 18 million ===
In August 2022, the electoral court disapproved of the expense report made by Avanza Libertad for the printing of ballots for the 2021 elections, following a complaint made by members of the front originally from the Democratic Party and the Union of the Democratic Centre accusing members of the party. Thus, the Avanza Libertad alliance was penalized for a total of 18,197,516 pesos for not having been able to duly prove the destination for which state contributions were used in the presentation of the final report of the primary election campaign.

=== Name change and merger ===
In 2022, Miguel Ángel Pichetto began to form a group and political party of Peronist origin to compete within the Juntos por el Cambio alliance in the 2023 Argentine general election. The Popular Dignity Party decided to merge with the Loyalty and Dignity party to join Pichetto's party, Federal Republican Encounter.
