= Amanda Peralta =

Argentine guerrilla & academic (1939–2009)

Amanda Beatriz Peralta, also known as la Negra, (1939–2009) was an Argentine guerrilla fighter and later an academic in Sweden. She was one of the founders of the Peronist Armed Forces or Fuerzas Armadas Peronistas (FAP) who fought against the military dictatorship in Argentina. After escaping from prison, she arrived in Sweden in 1977 where she continued to support her cause. She studied political history at the University of Gothenburg, undertaking research on post-colonial politics.

== Biography ==
Born on 22 November 1939, Amanda Beatriz Peralta was born in San Carlos de Bolívar, Argentina. While a student at La Planta from 1925, she fought for social reform as a member of the university's Federación de Estudiantes. She had already begun her campaign while in high school. In 1968, after a military coup deposed President Arturo Illia 1966, Peralta fought violently against the military dictatorship. She was captured and imprisoned but her lawyer managed to smuggle a pistol in to her which she used to escape. She escaped to Sweden with her family in 1977.

In Sweden, she continued campaigning against political oppression while studying intellectual history at University of Gothenburg. Her ideas and publications contributed to post-colonial theory. She continued publishing articles until the very end of her life.

Amanda Peralta died in Gothenburg on 2 January 2009.
