= Tendencia Revolucionaria =

Argentine ideology

Flag of the Uturuncos, one of the first Peronist groups to embrace the Tendencia Revolucionaria (Revolutionary Tendency) of Peronism.

Tendencia Revolucionaria (lit. Revolutionary Tendency), Tendencia Revolucionaria Peronista, or simply la Tendencia or revolutionary Peronism, was the name given in Argentina to a current of Peronism grouped around the guerrilla organisations FAR, FAP, Montoneros and the Juventud Peronista. Formed progressively in the 1960s and 1970s, and so called at the beginning of 1972, it was made up of various organisations that adopted a combative and revolutionary stance, in which Peronism was conceived as a form of Christian socialism, adapted to the situation in Argentina (socialismo nacional), as defined by Juan Perón himself. The Tendencia was supported and promoted by Perón, during the final stage of his exile, because of its ability to combat the dictatorship that called itself the Argentine Revolution. It had a great influence in the Peronist Resistance (1955-1973) and the first stage of Third Peronism, when Héctor J. Cámpora was elected President of the Nation on 11 March 1973.

The Revolutionary Tendency was made up of Montoneros-FAR as the core organisation and a group of non-military organisations, namely: Juventud Peronista Regionales (JP), Agrupación Evita de la Rama Femenina del Movimiento Peronista (AE), Juventud Universitaria Peronista (JUP), Juventud Trabajadora Peronista (JTP), Movimiento Villero Peronistas (MVP), Movimiento de Inquilinos Peronistas and Unión de Estudiantes Secundarios (UES).

== Ideology ==
=== Origins ===
The Revolutionary Tendency started forming in late 1950s following the overthrow and exile of Juan Perón. Peronism entered a bitter conflict with the Catholic Church in 1954, which was then recognized as the main factor behind Perón's loss of power in 1955. Perón was also thought to have been excommunicated; in June 1955, the Vatican excommunicated those responsible for government's deportation of two Italian priests from Argentina, without specifying any individual. Perón maintained that the excommunication did not include to him, claiming that he was not involved in the deportation in any way. According to an American historian Robert Crassweller, "the excommunication dated in 1955 did not, technically speaking, apply to Perón, “for it failed to comply with certain requirements of canon law." During his exile, Perón's relations with the Catholic Church would steadily improve, and he was granted marriage with Isabel by the Church. According to historian David F. D'Amico, "Perón was later forgiven by the Church, for he died on July 1, 1974, a faithful Catholic, and was administered extreme unction [by the Vatican] immediately before his death."

The first radical Peronist organization that was formed and is considered the precursor of Revolutionary Tendency were the Uturuncos, "tiger men" in Quechuan, formed in 1955 and composed of twenty Peronists with nationalist and socialist sympathies. Based in the mountains of Tucumán, Uturuncos wanted to establish themselves as a revolutionary vanguard and a way of political agitation. Each members had the acronym MPL-ELN on their shirt sleeves, standing for Movimiento Peronista de Liberación - Ejército de Liberación Nacional (English: Peronist Liberation Movement-National Liberation Army). The main ideologue of the organization was Abraham Guillén, Spanish Republican exiled in Argentina. He formed the political program of the organization that advocated for a socialist revolution carried out by a revolutionary minority which would serve as the locomotive of mass mobilization.

Argentina felt the impact of the Cuban Revolution, and John William Cooke, a close associate of Perón who would emerge as the main representative of the Peronist left, moved to Cuba in 1960. Cooke earned a reputation of a militant labor leader in the late 1950s, organizing major 1958 oil workers' strike and the 1959 Lisandro de la Torre strike, which he tried to transform into a Peronist revolution. While in Cuba, Cooke associated Peronism with Fidelism, seeing the left-wing nationalism of Peronism and Marxism-Leninism of Fidelism as complementary; he wrote: "Nowadays nobody thinks that national liberation can be achieved without social revolution and therefore the struggle is also [one] by the poor against the rich... Since national liberation is indivisible from social revolution, there is no bourgeois nationalism, for the bourgeoisie's objective was to 'privatize the lucre and socialize the sacrifices." Cooke's concept of mixing national liberation with social revolution became the core concept of Revolutionary Tendency, and was embraced by Perón himself.

With the assistance of Cooke, the Cuban Revolution opened dialogue between the revolutionary Cuban government and Perón. Che Guevara appealed for unity amongst anti-imperialist forces in Latin America, and explicitly recognized Peronism as a fellow anti-imperialist movement. Perón himself praised the Cuban Revolution and discussed the parallels it had with his own 'revolution', and would increasingly adapt the Cuban rhetoric in the 1960s. Che Guevara subsequently visited Perón in Madrid, and argued that Peronism is "a kind of indigenous Latin American socialism with which the Cuban Revolution could side". Perón maintained a close relationship with Guevara and paid homage to him upon his death in 1967, calling him "one of ours, perhaps the best" and remarking that Peronism "as a national, popular and revolutionary movement, pays homage to the idealist, the revolutionary, Comandante Ernesto Che Guevara, Argentine guerrilla dead in action taking up arms to seek the triumph of national revolutions in Latin America."

The Peronist alliance with Guevarism forced the Argentinian left to reconsider their stance of Peronism. Prior to 1955, while some rank-and-file members of socialist parties defected to Perón and his party, Communist and Socialist movements generally dismissed Peronism as fascism. This would change with the emergence of the "New Left" in the late 1950s which agreed with Guevara's description of Peronism as a genuine anti-imperialist movement that needs to be approached in order to mobilize the Argentinian working class towards the revolution. This was also connected to the left's disappointment with the anti-Peronist Revolución Libertadora - the following cabinets not only repeated and escalated elements of Peronism that the Argentinian left objected to such as siding with the Church hierarchy and perceived corruption, but they also rolled back Peronist social and economic programs that the left approved of.

=== Catholicism ===
Revolutionary thought within Peronism then evolved following the aggiornamento of the Catholic Church brought about by the Second Vatican Council. The aggiornamento made the Church concern itself more with the poor, the plight of the working class, and the problems of capitalism and imperialism; recognizing the growing Catholic participation in popular class struggles, Vatican found it permissible to enter dialogue with Marxism. Pacem in terris by Pope John XXIII went as far as stating that many elements of Marxism were "worthy of approval". The Second Vatican Council formalized a new orientation of the Church - poverty, injustice and exploitation, especially that of imperialism and colonialism, were condemned as results of greed for wealth and power; Vatican urged Catholics to struggle for equality in name of love for their fellow man. The most radical expression at the Council was that of Maximos IV Sayegh, who declared that "true socialism is a full Christian life that involves a just sharing of goods and fundamental equality", and also Populorum progressio by Pope Paul VI that was a synthesis of the Vatican II ideas, attacking "inequality, the profit motive, racism, and the selfishness of the richer nations". Paul VI particularly stressed the idea of "tyranny", arguing that it is not just a matter of an oppressive political system but also of social and economic systems that "dehumanize and maintain the existence of widespread poverty".

Prior to Vatican II, left-wing Catholicism was already present in Argentina and was represented by the so-called worker-priests, whose activity foreshadowed the ideas of Vatican II by working among the poor and sharing their experiences. Inspired by similar movements active in pre-WW2 France and Italy, Argentinian priests took jobs in mines and factories and became part of the blue-collar communities and labour unions, challenging the communist presence in trade unions in favour of promoting Catholic socialism. Vatican II further empowered the current of left-wing Catholicism and introduced new concepts and movements such as the option for the poor and liberation theology, and left-wing clergy then became overtly political with the creation of Movement of Priests for the Third World (Spanish: Movimiento de Sacerdotes para el Tercer Mundo) in Argentina, which praised socialism and condemned capitalism for "subjecting man to the economy and subordinating social to economic values".

One of the key characters behind liberation theology was Camilo Torres Restrepo, a Roman Catholic priest who also became a Marxist-Leninist guerilla fighter. Torres stated that "the duty of every Catholic is to be a revolutionary", and his activity inspired Juan García Elorrio to found a magazine Cristianismo y Revolución in 1966, which reconciled Political Catholicism with revolutionary socialism and Marxism-Leninism through liberation theology. The deep commitment to Catholic faith of Camilo Torres led him to an increasingly radical commitment, actively supporting the cause of the poor and gradually becoming convinced that in order to ensure social justice, Catholics not only had an obligation to participate in politics, but also in armed struggle. He described priesthood as being "a full-time professional of love" and that "only through revolution was it possible to realise this love of neighbour". According to Torres, the Catholic imperivate is not only to spread the Gospel and realize the ideals of social justice and love for the poor through charity, but to also make this love effective. Torres argued that the only way to effectively realize these Catholic ideals is the revolution.

The emergence of radicalized Catholic movements coincided with Juan Perón finding support amongst the Catholic clergy again, after losing it in 1955. In 1963, Perón made a formal petition for pardon to Pope John XXIII, which was granted - this fact, however, was not made public in Argentina until 1971. He also wrote extensively on his concept of "national socialism" in exile, which he defined as an autochthonous form of socialism, as opposed to internationalist and universalist elements of Marxism. Perón described Peronism as "simple, practical, popular, profoundly Christian, and profoundly humanistic." Perón's writings formulated what Donald C. Hodges describes as "Christian and humanist version of socialism" - Perón also stressed nationalism of Peronism, directly promoting "socialism of the national community" based on the Catholic doctrine and the writings of Gottfried Feder. This 'national socialism' was opposed to capitalism in its entirety, but also stressed the need to promote nationalism as Peronist socialism was meant to serve the national community rather than integrate, absorb or universalize it. Despite this, Perón did not break with Marxism and international socialism but rather presented Peronism as a variant of it, arguing that his "movement forms part of a great world process that marches with the rest of humanity toward a universal socialism"; he also added: "I have not the least doubt that in the twenty-first century the world will be socialist. . . whether it is called populism, socialism, or justicialism."

=== Christian national socialism ===
Perón made further overtures to left-wing Catholicism by also calling his ideology socialismo nacional cristiano - "Christian national socialism", where he combined the Catholic concept of social justice together with socialist and anti-imperialist struggle for economic independence and nationalist call for popular sovereignty. Peronism would expand into the left-wing priests known as tercermundistas ("third-worldists") through the Third World Priests Movement, which taught Marxist-aligned liberation theology and stressed the need to alleviate poor masses from colonial and semi-colonial conditions around the world. Perón fully embraced the social reforms of Vatican II and liberation theology, arguing that it aligned with the principles of his justicialismo and declaring that Peronism is to be built on "the same Gospel message" and principles as liberation theology. Peronism became a part of revolutionary Catholicism and was infused with Guevarist ideas and liberation theology based on the beliefs of Camilo Torres, who was exalted as a martyr against "permanent exploitation and violence," the "structures of colonialism" and "imperialist penetration". While Peronism was in itself a nationalist movement, its fusion with liberation theology allowed radicalized youth and clergy to extend Peronist anti-imperialism to solidarity with "nations of Latin America, Asia, and Africa" that were "exploited by colonialism and imperialism." This was further encouraged by Perón's publication La Hora de los Pueblos, which was a call for an international struggle against imperialism of the United States.

In his writings, Perón argued that nationalism is not at odds with socialism and that both doctrines are far from antagonistic, and should be united with a common objective of "the liberation of peoples and men". Peronism was described as the national expression of socialism, insofar as it represents, expresses and develops in action the aspirations of the popular masses and the Argentine working class. National socialism was to be autochthonous socialism, "a definitive overcoming of foreign imperialism" and "last frontier for achieving political and economic emancipation in Argentina". Perón declared that "that word that sounds so strange at times, national socialism, lost its strangeness and acquired significance as a vehicle for eradicating the oppression of capital". Peronist movements also used the quotes of Eva Perón from the 1940s, such as Eva's portrayal of Peronism as a way to "put an end in this century to the race of the exploiters". Perón also wrote: "The history of Peronism had confirmed that, within the capitalist system, there is no solution for the workers"; Peronist national socialism in his understanding had as its aim "to put society at the service of man and man at the service of society; to rescue moral and ethical values, honesty and humility, as the fundamental axis of this stage; to socialise the means of production, nationalise banking, carry out a profound cultural reform, hand over the administration of the land to those who work it through a profound agrarian revolution, nationalise foreign trade." The nationalism of Peronism was to be based on demands for self-determination of "peoples subjugated by the imperial powers" and to exercise the demand for sovereignty through "people's representatives" through Perón, but to also consider imperialism a part of a deeper problem which were the "limitations of capitalism in sustaining its structure of domination."

=== Liberation theology ===
The Argentine worker-priests and liberation theology followers then passionately embraced Peronism, calling it a "precursor of Liberation Theology" and the Third World Priests Movement arguing that "the Peronist movement, revolutionary, with its massive force, will necessarily lead to the revolution which will make possible an original and Latin American socialism." Radicalized Catholic clergy became synonymous with Peronism in Argentina; this connection was so strong that in 2013, liberation theologian Leonardo Boff called Pope Francis Peronist, stating that the Pope was "clearly defining that the enemy of the peoples is capitalism, and to say that he must have great courage: he has to be Argentine, he has to be a Jesuit and he has to be a Peronist." Because of this, Peronist Left developed not out of socialist "entryism", but rather through the work of left-wing priests who radicalized Catholic nationalist youth, of both Peronist and anti-Peronist allegiance, into the Revolutionary Tendency. According to Richard Gillespie, almost all members of the most prominent organization representative of the Revolutionary Tendency, the Montoneros, "had gained their political baptism in branches of the traditionally-conservative Catholic Action (AC); some had even started out in the Falange-inspired Tacuara; very few originated on the Left, and hardly any began their political lives as Peronists."

Revolutionary Tendency, including the Montoneros, was founded on the basis of Elorrio's teachings and his Cristianismo y Revolución. Elorrio acted as a link so that the revolutionary youth militancy could meet, whether in pastoral meetings, student congresses or trade union plenaries, or during military training in Cuba. The Revolutionary Tendency was therefore based on the tenets of Catholic socialism, such as the Populorum Progressio, which enabled the path to revolutionary insurrection and violence against oppression. However, radicalized Peronists would gradually break from Elorrio because of his perceived reformism, as Elorrio was associated with "moderate" liberation theology priests such as Carlos Mugica, who would often make statements against armed revolution and argue: "I am prepared to be killed but I am not prepared to kill". This break was shown by the formation of Camilo Torres Command in 1967, which was a direct precursor of the Montoneros. Camilo Torres Command would explicitly reject Elorrio's patronage in favour of Camilo Torres, who fully supported armed revolution and died fighting in one.

== Origin of the denomination ==
María Laura Lenci stated that the name Tendencia Revolucionaria appeared in January 1972 in the Provisional Council of the Peronist Youth in which two lines were delimited: one that supported the armed struggle (Tendencia Revolucionaria) and another that rejected it (Comando de Organización and Iron Guard). The name Tendencia Revolucionaria del Peronismo was first used at the Second Congress of Revolutionary Peronism held in Córdoba in January 1969 to define the groups that were in favour of armed struggle. Generically, the name included a heterogeneous group of actors and organisations that ascribed to Peronism as a political identity and proposed a revolutionary solution to the crisis of the system, i.e. they postulated the construction of "national socialism" (not to be confused with Nazism) and endorsed the methodology of armed struggle.

== Members ==
The organisations that made up La Tendencia were Montoneros, FAR, Juventud Peronista Regionales, Juventud Universitaria Peronista (JUP), Juventud Trabajadora Peronista (JTP), Unión de Estudiantes Secundarios (UES), Agrupación Evita and Movimiento Villero Peronista (MVP). In a broader sense, some authors also include in the Tendency sectors that were not subordinate to the Montoneros or the FAR, such as the Fuerzas Armadas Peronistas, Peronismo de Base and the Movimiento Revolucionario 17 de Octubre. Meanwhile, figures from the artistic, intellectual, political and trade union spheres who were militants in the ranks of militant Peronism but did not belong organically to any of these organisations were also recognised as members of the Tendencia Revolucionaria.

In this broad sense, the Tendencia encompassed a wide range of organisations, militants and sympathisers of a revolutionary stance of Peronism whose non-exhaustive nonym is as follows:

Acronym	Name	Sources
ARP	Acción Revolucionaria Peronista	
	Agrupación de Artesanos Peronistas	
AE	Agrupación Evita de la Rama Femenina	
CGTA	CGT de los Argentinos	
	Comando Camilo Torres	
CRU	Comando Revolucionario Universitario	
CPL	Comandos Peronistas de Liberación	
	Descamisados	
FLP	Frente de Lisiados Peronistas	
FRP	Frente Revolucionario Peronista	
FAP	Peronist Armed Forces	
FAP17	Fuerzas Armadas Peronistas 17 de octubre	
JAEN	Argentine Youth for National Emancipation	
	Montoneros	
MIP	Movimiento de Inquilinos Peronistas	
MPM	Movimiento Peronista Montonero	
MRP	Movimiento Revolucionario Peronista	
MR 17	Movimiento Revolucionario 17 de Octubre	
MVP	Movimiento Villero Peronista	
OP17	Organización Peronista 17 de Octubre	
PB	Peronismo de Base	
PB 17 de Octubre	Peronismo de Base 17 de Octubre	
UES	Unión de Estudiantes Secundarios	

Within the Peronist Youth were:

Acronym	Name	Sources
FPL	Frente Peronista de Liberación	
JP	Juventud Peronista	
JPB	Juventud Peronista Barrial	
JRP	Juventud Revolucionaria Peronista	
JTP	Juventud Trabajadora Peronista	
JUP	Juventud Universitaria Peronista	
MJP	Movimiento Juventud Peronista	

== History ==
=== The Peronist Resistance ===
After the coup d'état that overthrew the constitutional president Juan D. Perón in 1955 and the installation of a dictatorship called Revolución Libertadora that outlawed Peronism and sought to "desperonize" the population, the Peronist citizenry began a process of struggle known as the Peronist Resistance. At first, the struggle against the dictatorship and the proscription focused on the possibility of a Peronist military uprising, supported by sabotage actions by civilian groups, mainly industrialists.

But after the failure of the Valle Uprising in 1956 and the state terrorism used to repress it, by means of illegal and clandestine shootings, a sector of Peronism began to take an insurrectional path, supported by the armed guerrilla struggle, identified with the nationalist and revolutionary processes of the national liberation that were multiplying in the Third World in those years, such as the Chinese Communist Revolution, the Algerian War of Liberation, the Vietnam War (1955-1973), and especially the Cuban Revolution (1958) and the leading presence in it of the Argentine Ernesto Che Guevara.

In this insurrectionary path of Peronism, Perón's decision to appoint John William Cooke (1919-1968) as his personal representative in Argentina and in his name to preside over the entire Peronist forces played a very important role. Cooke came from the intransigent reformist yrigoyenista student movement, and was one of those who initially formed Peronism, being elected national deputy in 1946, at the age of only 25. Cooke stood out during Perón's first two presidencies, for his anti-imperialist and anti-oligarchic thinking. Cooke played an important role in the Perón-Frondizi pact that allowed the latter to be elected president in 1958, but given the inability of Frondizismo to get rid of military control and open a democratic process, Cooke concluded that only a revolutionary path could allow the installation of a true democracy in Argentina.

=== The insurrectionary struggle: FAR and Montoneros ===
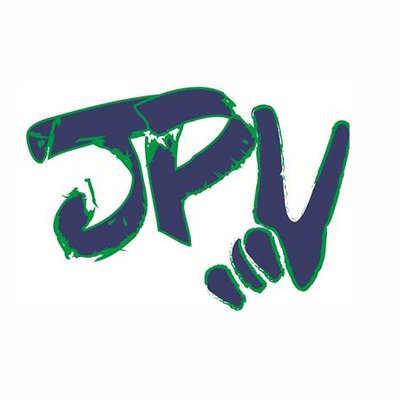
Seal of Juventud Peronista

Political and social conflict was radicalised in Argentina, following the overthrow of the radical Arturo Illia in 1966 and the installation of a permanent dictatorship self-styled Argentine Revolution which provided for the abolition of political parties, following the dictates of the National Security Doctrine established by the United States for Latin America in the framework of the Cold War. In this period dozens of popular uprisings took place, such as the Cordobazo, the Rosariazo, the Tucumanazo, etc., with a high mobilisation of the student movement and the trade unions. In this context, several guerrilla organisations emerged, among them FAR (1969) - of Peronist Marxist ideology - and Montoneros (1970) - of Peronist Catholic ideology.

By then the revolutionary armed struggle was spreading throughout much of Latin America, from the Tupamaros in Uruguay, to the sandinistas in Nicaragua. Che Guevara himself had been assassinated in 1967 when he had opened a guerrilla front in Bolivia, very close to the border with Argentina, from where he received supplies and support.

At the same time, a very important sector of the Latin American Catholic Church developed a thinking and action of commitment to "the poor", in solidarity with the liberation movements, which adopted the name of Liberation Theology. In Argentina this current manifested itself through the magazine Cristianismo y Revolución and the Movimiento de Sacerdotes para el Tercer Mundo (1967), creating in turn the movement of curas villeros. Many of its members would become members of La Tendencia.

Perón explicitly supported the guerrilla organisations, which he called special formations, and made an updating of his political thought, characterising Peronism as a national liberation movement which, like other similar movements in the Third World, fought to establish socialism, which in the case of Argentina was to have its own characteristics and be of Christian inspiration. He also appointed one of the Montoneros' leaders, Rodolfo Galimberti, as head of the Peronist Youth in the Peronist High Council, who in turn proceeded to organise it on the basis of a system of regional territorial organisations, which is why it is known as JP-Regionales.

In 1970, the guerrilla struggle and popular insurrections brought about the collapse of the permanent dictatorship led by General Juan Carlos Onganía. Onganía was overthrown by an internal coup and the sectors of military and conservative power accepted that it was not possible to exclude Peronism from Argentine political life, initiating an electoral "way out" that took the name of Gran Acuerdo Nacional (GAN), including Peronism, but led by the Armed Forces.

=== "Luche y vuelve" (Fight and come back) ===
In 1972 Perón, seconded by Héctor J. Cámpora as personal delegate, FAR and Montoneros and the Peronist Youth, decided to disregard the GAN, to promote an electoral solution agreed exclusively among civilians (political parties, trade unions and business organizations). At that time the Tendency identified itself as such. After the Trelew Massacre committed by the Navy on 22 August 1972 in order to cancel the democratic solution, the Peronist Youth began to press for Perón's return to the country, in open defiance of the dictatorship. Perón accepted the proposal and appointed one of the leading members of la Tendencia, Juan Manuel Abal Medina, then aged 27, as Secretary General of the National Justicialist Movement, with the mission of directing the Return Operation. The slogan used by la Tendencia is "Luche y vuelve".

The Operativo Retorno was successful, and Perón finally returned to the country on 17 November 1972, making the GAN promoted by the dictatorship fail definitively and becoming the axis of a democratic civil pact, with the political parties, trade unions and businessmen, symbolised by the embrace with the radical leader Ricardo Balbín, after years of political enmity.

=== The Frejuli ===
The role played in the collapse of the dictatorship and the success of Operativo Retorno strengthened la Tendencia, making it gain popularity. In these conditions the elections of 11 March 1973 took place. Peronism formed a large electoral front called Frente Justicialista de Liberación (Frejuli), with forces that in the past had been anti-Peronist, such as Frondizismo, popular conservatism and a sector of Christian democracy. Due to the restrictions imposed by the dictatorship, Perón was unable to stand as a candidate, and Héctor J. Cámpora was nominated for the presidency, seconded by the popular conservative Vicente Solano Lima. Cámpora had established a solid relationship with La Tendencia.

The Peronist Movement at that time was made up of four branches (political, trade union, women's and youth), among which the positions of power were to be equally distributed. Because the Tendency controlled the youth, in the distribution of positions it competed mainly with the trade union branch, whose majority was defined as "orthodox" Justicialist. This competition opened up a conflict between the Tendency and other groups of combative Peronism, with the sectors that recognised themselves as orthodox Peronism, which would extend throughout the Peronist government (1973-1976). In this way, several governors and vice-governors, as well as senators and national deputies and mayors, were members of or maintained close relations with the positions of the Tendencia.

=== The government of Cámpora ===
After the democratic government took office on May 25, 1973, la Tendencia deployed its mass organizations by front (JP-Regionales, JUP, UES, JTP, Agrupación Evita, MVP), which considerably increased its popularity and militancy, especially among young people. From the national and provincial governments, la Tendencia promoted considerable social changes, such as agrarian reforms, the industrialisation of the interior of the country, the increase in real wages, adult education, unrestricted access to public universities, the strengthening of delegate bodies in companies, the entry of Argentina into the Non-Aligned Movement (NAM), etc.

Simultaneously the Tendencia began to be violently attacked because of its militant ideology, using disqualifying adjectives such as "lefties" or "infiltrators", the latter expression related to the accusation of "Marxist infiltration in Peronism". A decisive event in this conflict was the Ezeiza Massacre of 20 June 1973, on the occasion of Perón's definitive return to the country, when the columns of la Tendencia that tried to approach the stage were attacked and repressed by armed groups belonging to the orthodox Peronism sectors.
