= Aldo Rico =

Argentine lieutenant colonel and politician

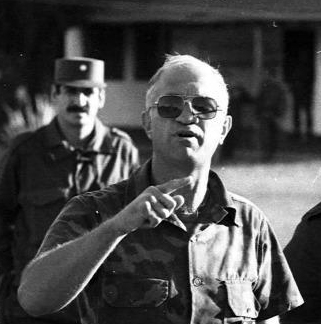
- Rico in 1987
- Born: 4 March 1943 (age 83); Buenos Aires, Argentina
- Military career
- Allegiance: Argentina
- Rank: Lieutenant Colonel

Aldo Rico (born 4 March 1943) is an Argentine retired Lieutenant Colonel and politician, famous for his role in the episodes of 1987 (usually referred to as "Semana Santa", or Easter week) and 1988 (the "Monte Caseros" mutiny) where sectors of the Armed Forces, known as carapintadas ("painted faces", due to their facial camouflage), revolted to protest the policies of President Raúl Alfonsín. Rico later created the MODIN political party and contested several elections. Rico was elected mayor of San Miguel (1997–2003) and was Minister of Police of Buenos Aires province for a short period in 1999.

== Role in Falklands (Malvinas) war ==
Rico was born in Buenos Aires, and was an army major at the time of the 1982 Falklands War, serving as commander of the 602 Commando Company.

== The Carapintada uprising ==
After the Falklands war, Rico was promoted to the rank of lieutenant colonel and started agitating against the prosecution for crimes against humanity of the 1976-1983 juntas. In 1987, Rico and his followers took up arms in Easter week and made a number of demands. The Argentine public was overly sensitive to any military claims as every President elected democratically since 1928 had been deposed by successive coups d'état, and rallied around Alfonsín, who agreed to consider the demands of the Carapintadas. No blood was shed in the episode, but Alfonsín was accused of caving in to insurgent demands, and came to be perceived as a weak president. Rico was sentenced to house arrest, but escaped in 1988 and led a second armed episode; he was imprisoned in its aftermath. Mohamed Alí Seineldín took over the leadership of the military rebellion, and Rico shifted his focus to electoral politics.

== Politics ==
President Carlos Menem pardoned Rico in 1989 in the context of a series of pardons that included all former Junta members. Rico created the MODIN party (Movimiento por la Dignidad Nacional, "Movement for National Dignity"). Rico occupied several elective offices, including as a member of the Constitutional Convention during the Menem administration. He was elected as mayor of San Miguel in 1997. Two years later, Buenos Aires province governor Carlos Ruckauf named Rico as Minister of Police, but a series of scandals made Rico quit the post after four months.

In the 2000s, Modin was merged into the Peronists; Rico declared his intent of running again for mayor in 2011.

== Violent attacks on Rico ==
On 24 February 1998, Rico was accosted at the door of his house by two assailants in a pickup truck. One of them triggered a firearm twice, but it misfired. On 20 July 2007 he was attacked again while leaving his house to take his two step-daughters to school; he fired four or five shots in the air, and the robbers fled in a car.

On 6 February 2011 four or more armed men attempted to rob Rico and his family in their car at Moreno; he repelled the attack with his 9mm pistol. He was hit three times, not seriously, and may have fatally wounded an attacker.

== Notes ==
- Monte Caseros: incendio en las chilcas Aldo Rico, Carlos Bernardo Borovinsky, Novela, Ediciones de la Osa Mayor, Buenos Aires. 1988, 240 páginas.
