= Stereotypes of Argentines =

Portrayal of Argentines in different cultures

Stereotypes of Argentines are generalizations about Argentines. Stereotypes associated with Argentines vary from country to country depending on the prevalent stereotype in each culture.

In Brazil, Chile and Uruguay, Argentines are stereotyped as arrogant, proud, narcissistic. To this Argentines are also known for being gossipy, full of grandeur, liars (chantas), envious, quick and exaggerated in Uruguay. In addition to the above, Argentines have also been labeled as lazy, vain, and pedantic, but also kind and carefree, in scientific polls.

In some Spanish-speaking countries (such as Spain, Colombia, Paraguay and Peru), Argentines are stereotyped as passionate –though somewhat coarse– as well as noble, honest, and kind.

In Europe, Argentines have also been suggested to consume large quatities of meat, be overly concerned with football and to belong to a country of beautiful women.

== See also ==
- Argentine nationalism
- Anti-Argentine sentiment
