= New Triumph Party =

New Triumph Party Partido Nuevo Triunfo
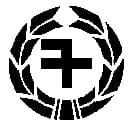
- Founder: Alejandro Biondini
- Founded: 14 March 1990
- Dissolved: 17 March 2009
- Split from: Justicialist Party
- Preceded by: Partido Nacionalista de los Trabajadores
- Succeeded by: Alternativa Social (2009-2013); Bandera Vecinal (2013-2019); Patriot Front (since 2019)
- Headquarters: Buenos Aires, Argentina
- Ideology: Neo-Nazism; Third Position; Orthodox Peronism; Anglophobia; Anti-immigration; White supremacy White nationalism Nacionalismo; Irredentism
- Political position: Far-right

Party flag

Partido Nuevo Triunfo (New Triumph Party) was a small far-right and Neo-Nazi political party in Argentina banned on 17 March 2009 through a ruling by the Argentine Supreme Court of Justice.

== Origins ==
The party was formed by Alejandro Biondini in 1990 as the Partido Nacionalista de los Trabajadores (Nationalist Worker's Party), initially as a breakaway from the Justicialist Party. The party leader anticipated economic crisis in the country which he felt would set up the basis for a takeover by revolutionary nationalism. Biondini is a veteran of the international neo-Nazi scene, having established a group called Alerta Nacional in 1984, which he described as 'a small part of the great worldwide socialist movement'. This group attempted to form links between the country's various extreme right groups.

== Development ==
The party was re-launched as the New Triumph Party in November 1997, identifying itself as 'the political, militant and electoral expression of Argentine national socialism'. At a time when use of the internet by fringe political groups was limited but growing in popularity the New Triumph Party's online publication Libertad de Opinión (Freedom of Opinion) broke new ground in Argentina by providing a regular forum for Argentine neo-Nazism and anti-Semitism. Ricardo Brinzoni was briefly associated with the group as his lawyer Juan Enrique Torres Bande was a member.

The party has consistently attempted to gain legal recognition but has been rejected. Nonetheless, in the 2005 Argentine legislative election Biondini's wife and son, members of the party, stood as candidates for Acción Ciudadana, a group headed by Jorge Colotto, the general commissioner of the Policía Federal Argentina.

== Ideology ==
The party supports Neo-Nazism and seeks to use Argentina as the new Nazi base. It has been claimed that Biondini believes that Adolf Hitler had identified Argentina as the future of Nazism. He has claimed that in the final days in the Führerbunker Hitler pointed to Argentina on a map and stated that 'from there the new leader will come'.

The party has also been vocal in its criticism of the major political parties and leaders, denouncing Fernando de la Rúa as a puppet of the Zionist Occupation Government, a conspiracy theory. As part of this rhetoric it also emphasises its grounding in Christianity.

== Platform ==
The ideas of the party have been summed up by them in declaration of policies which states five aims for the Argentine people. These are listed as:

- The reaffirmation of the values of Argentina, based on God and country with a firm stance taken against all who would seek to damage these values.
- Dignity for the Argentine worker, through the establishment of a corporatist parliament.
- Defence of national sovereignty at all costs, with a systematic programme of rearmament in order to recover the Malvinas Islands (Falkland Islands) and Patagonia.
- The establishment of a purely Argentine economic system which would eliminate usury and unite classes under corporatism.
- A much stricter legal code, including punishments for those it feels have benefitted from Argentina's struggles.
