= Mohamed Alí Seineldín =

Argentine Army colonel (1933-2009)

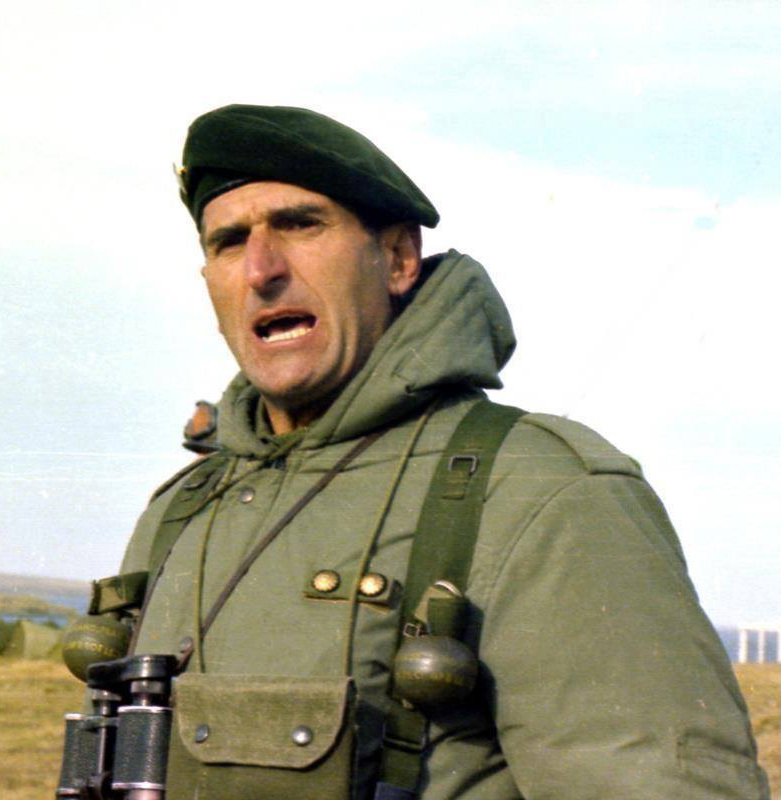
- Seineldín in 1982 during the Falklands War
- Born: November 12, 1933; Concepción del Uruguay, Entre Ríos, Argentina
- Died: September 2, 2009 (aged 75); Buenos Aires, Argentina
- Military career
- Allegiance: Argentina
- Branch: Argentine Army
- Rank: Colonel
- Nicknames: Milo, El Turco
- Conflicts: Operativo Independencia; Falklands War; Operation Rosario

Mohamed Alí Seineldín (Spanish: [moaˈmeð aˈli seinelˈdin]; November 12, 1933 – September 2, 2009) was an Argentine army colonel who participated in two failed uprisings against the democratically elected governments of both President Raúl Alfonsín and President Carlos Menem in 1988 and 1990.

== Early life ==
Seineldín was born in Concepción del Uruguay into a Lebanese Argentine family. He converted from Druzism to Roman Catholicism during his youth, and was consecrated to the Virgin of the Rosary (Virgen del Rosario). He remained a devout Roman Catholic throughout his life, even devoting his men in the army to the Virgin of the Holy Rosary as well.

== Falkland War ==
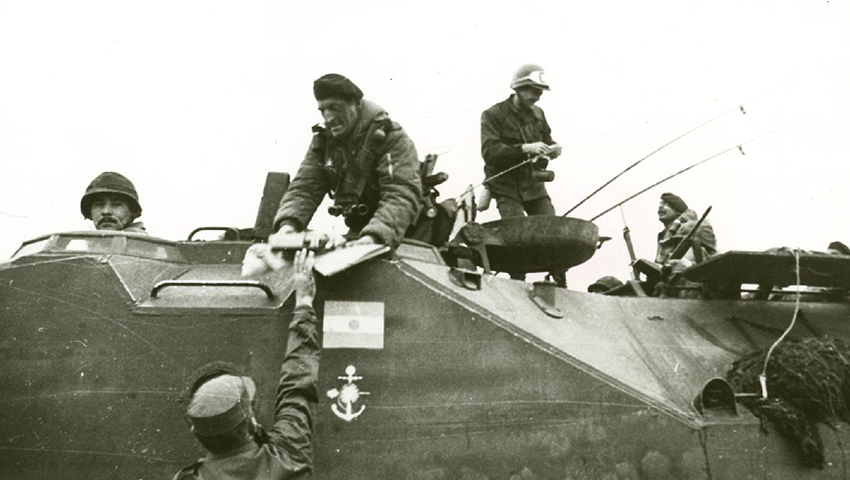
Seineldin (wearing beret) onboard a AAV during Operation Rosario

Seineldín rose to prominence in Argentina during the 1982 Falklands War against the United Kingdom, where he was in command of the 25th Infantry Regiment, part of the garrison occupying Port Stanley. He had a role in Operation Rosario, the Argentine invasion of the Falkland Islands. The operation, conducted on April 2, 1982, secured the islands' capital, Port Stanley without significant bloodshed.

== "Carapintada" activity ==
An ardent Christian Argentine nationalist, Seineldín became a member of the Carapintadas, or "painted faces," group within the Argentine Army. The Carapintadas demanded that the Argentine government halt legal proceedings against army officers accused of human rights abuses during the Dirty War, which occurred during Argentina's military dictatorship from 1976 to 1983. The low-ranking officers were charged with a wide range of crimes, including the execution of guerrilla dissidents, torture and kidnapping of guerrilla fighters and their supporters.

In 1987 and 1988, the Carapintadas rebelled against the elected government of President Raúl Alfonsín, but both uprisings were quickly put down. In December 1988, members of the Grupo Albatros, led by Colonel Mohamed Alí Seineldín, rebelled once again against the Alfonsín government and seized the military barracks at Villa Martelli. The mutineers eventually surrendered and Seineldín was arrested.

Seineldín led a second unsuccessful uprising against the government of President Carlos Menem beginning on December 3, 1990. The failed uprising resulted in 14 deaths, including five civilians. Seineldín was sentenced to life in prison for his role in the 1990 mutiny. However, he was pardoned by President Eduardo Duhalde in 2003. During his trial, he assumed full guilt and denounced how Menem's government was servile to the United States' imperialism in Latin America through the privatizations of strategic services and the suspension of scientific and military projects.

== Death ==
Mohamed Alí Seineldín suffered a heart attack and died in a hospital in Buenos Aires on September 2, 2009, at the age of 75.
