= Movement for Dignity and Independence =

Defunct political party in Argentina

Movement for Dignity and Independence Movimiento por la Dignidad y la Independencia
- Abbreviation: MODIN
- President: Enrique Venturino
- Founder: Aldo Rico
- Founded: 1988
- Dissolved: 20 June 2010
- Merged into: Partido del Campo Popular
- Headquarters: Buenos Aires
- Ideology: Conservatism; Nationalism; Militarism; Orthodox Peronism
- Political position: Far-right

Website
- http://www.modin.org.ar/

The Movement for Dignity and Independence (Spanish: Movimiento por la Dignidad y la Independencia), usually shortened as "MODIN", was an Argentine political party, led by the former Carapintada Aldo Rico. It became the third most voted party in the 1993 legislative elections. They ended in the fourth place the following year, during the elections for the 1994 constituent assembly. The party split up in 1995, and in 2010 changed its name to Partido del Campo Popular.
