= Peronist Armed Forces =

Argentine left-wing peronist guerrilla organization

- Fuerzas Armadas Peronistas
- Leader: Envar Cacho El Kadri
- Dates active: 1968-1970s
- Country: Argentina
- Ideology: Peronism; Tendencia Revolucionaria
- Political position: Left-wing

The Peronist Armed Forces (Spanish: Fuerzas Armadas Peronistas, FAP) were an Argentine left-wing Peronist urban guerrilla group created in 1968 and active during the 1960s and 1970s. The organization applied strikes directly against the Argentinian state forces. The FAP were led by Envar Cacho El Kadri. His appearance came on 17 September 1968 with an unsuccessful armed action in Taco Ralo, Tucumán. By 1971 the organization split into FAP Comando Central and a minority faction known as FAP 17. The former preferred armed struggle over the election of Perón as strategy while the latter joined Tendencia Revolucionaria.

Among its initial actions was the laying of an ambush along a bridge over the Luján River on 29 April 1971, in which Lieutenant Mario Asúa was killed and Private Hugo Vacca was mortally wounded. The truck they were traveling in was robbed of all military equipment essential for the guerrilla war effort.

== See also ==
- Montoneros
- People's Revolutionary Army
- Amanda Peralta
- Orthodox Peronism
