= Carapintadas =

Military pronouncement in Argentina

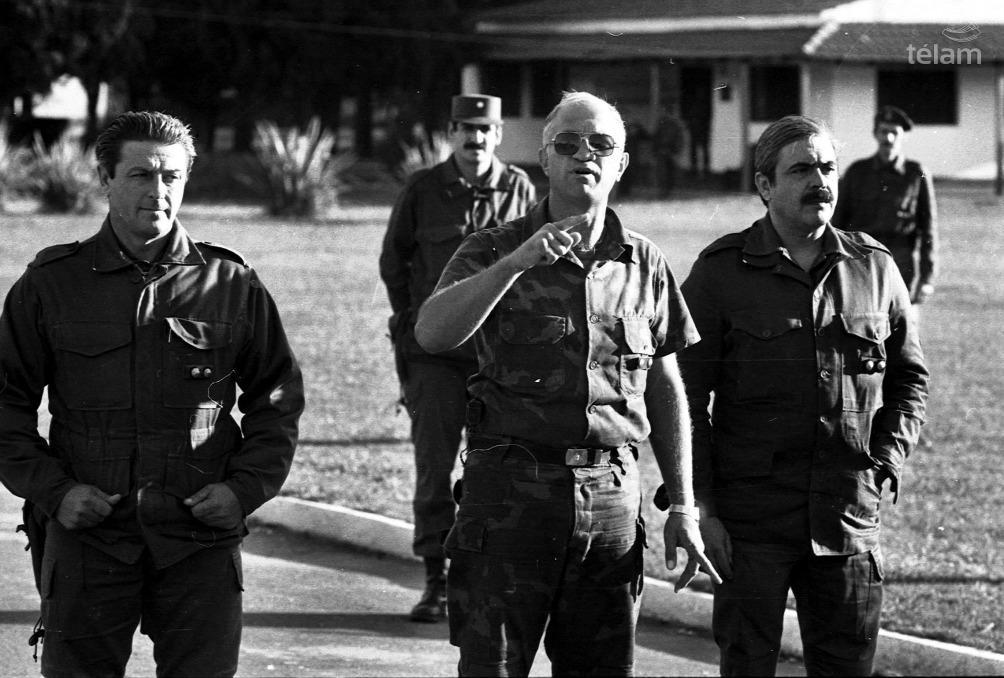
Aldo Rico and the Carapintadas

The Carapintadas (English: Painted Faces) were a group of mutineers in the Argentine Army, who took part in various uprisings between 1987 and 1990 during the presidencies of Raúl Alfonsín and Carlos Menem in Argentina. The rebellions, while at first thought to be an attempt at a military coup, were staged primarily to assert displeasure against the civilian government and make certain military demands known.

== Background ==
Following Argentina’s return to democracy in 1983 with the election of Raúl Alfonsín, the new democratic government sought justice for the human rights violations perpetrated by the military government. The creation of CONADEP, the publication of Nunca Más report, the reform to the Military Justice Code, and the Trial of the Juntas (Juicio de las Juntas) were some of the measures taken to shed light on what had happened during the Proceso de Reorganización Nacional and bring the perpetrators to justice.

== Carapintadas uprisings ==
Carapintadas uprisings
Date	1987–1990
Location	Argentina

Belligerents
Argentina	Carapintadas

Commanders and leaders
(Argentina) Raúl Alfonsín (Argentina) Carlos Menem	Aldo Rico; Mohamed Alí Seineldín

On April 15, 1987, Lieutenant Colonel Aldo Rico led the first uprising of the Carapintadas at the Campo de Mayo Infantry School in Buenos Aires. The Carapintadas referred to this uprising as Operación Dignidad, a reflection of their demands for honor and respect to be shown to the Armed Forces, something that the Carapintadas felt had been lost under the new democratic regime. Among this general sentiment, there was also a call for the end to the trials for human rights violations and removal of the army chief of staff. In future uprisings, the Carapintadas would include expansion of the military budget among their demands. President Alfonsín addressed an estimated 200,000 protestors who had gathered in front of the Casa Rosada (Argentina's presidential palace), promising to end the conflict, before traveling to Campo de Mayo to negotiate with Rico. On April 19, 1987, the Carapintadas surrendered.

The Carapintadas revolted again under Rico's command in January 1988 in Monte Caseros. Six other regiments joined Rico in solidarity, adding up to a total of 350 soldiers. An unconditional surrender followed 5 days later, whereupon Rico was expelled from the army and imprisoned, while other Carapintada members were forced to retire, expelled from the army, or exiled.

The third uprising took place in December of that year, when members of the Albatros special unit, led by Mohamed Alí Seineldín, took control of the military barracks in Villa Martelli. The demands of this rebellion were similar to the previous two: they requested the resignation of General Caridi and that his replacement be pro-Carapintada; full amnesty beyond the Due Obedience law; and an increase in military salaries. However, by this rebellion, the demands of the Carapintada were beginning to become much more vague than the previous uprisings under Rico. They were later followed by around 1,000 troops of the three armed forces. The mutineers surrendered days later, but only Seineldín and Major Hugo Abete were arrested. Several of the mutineers' demands were conceded by the government, such as the replacement of General Caridi with General Gassino and a military pay increase.

As was reported in the Buenos Aires Herald at the time, and in The Journal of Commerce and other US publications, both Rico and Seineldín spent time in Central America, where they trained Argentine cadres and other troops involved in supporting the US anti-leftist mission in the region. Both men have more than tangential connection to the organized torture and human rights violations that were carried out by the Argentine military during the nation's Dirty War.

In October 1989, president elect Carlos Menem signed a pardon for a number of detained military men; including 39 held by events during the military dictatorship, and 164 Carapintadas. In spite of this, on December 3, 1990 Seineldín again staged what would become known as the most violent Carapintada uprising. After the takeover of eight regiments, the rebellion ended with several deaths and 300 arrested. Because of President Menem’s positive relations with the military, the uprising did not gain much military support and was shut down by the loyalist military within 36 hours. A few days later, Menem signed the pardon for all the most important people convicted for misdeeds during the Dirty War.

== Significance ==
The uprisings of the Carapintadas had significant effects on the trajectory of Argentine civil-military relations and transitional justice processes. President Alfonsín’s government inherited a substantial amount of debt from its military predecessor, which led to intense slashing of the military budget. This was interpreted as an attempt to undercut and weaken the military in addition to the humiliation of the human rights trials and denunciation of the National Reorganization Process.

The first rebellion was also the first outright expression of the Argentine Armed Forces regarding the memory of the Dirty War. In the eyes of the Carapintadas, the National Reorganization Process had been a necessary war against Communist subversion and the military had saved the Argentine way of life. The rebellions as a whole created rifts within the military itself: while the non-Carapintada military did not fully support the rebellion, they were unwilling to repress the Carapintadas until the final uprising under Menem.

The rebellions also created tensions and power struggles between the government and military for several years afterward. Rather than attempting to organically cultivate military support for the democratic civilian government, Alfonsín’s administration had instead attempted to force the Armed Forces to respect civilian control.

Additionally, the government’s response to the uprisings weakened civilian faith in the new democracy’s ability to manage the military and proceed with human rights rectification. The passing of the Due Obedience Law shortly after the first Carapintada uprising in 1987 was seen by many human rights groups and activists as Alfonsín making concessions with what remained of authoritarian rule.

Leaders of the Carapintadas later entered politics. Aldo Rico formed MODIN and ran for president in 1995, while Gustavo Obeid formed the Peoples Reconstruction Party. Both parties have a right-wing nationalist orientation.

== See also ==
- 1989 attack on La Tablada Regiment
