= Patriot Front (Argentina) =

Far-right Argentine political party

Patriotic Front Frente Patriota
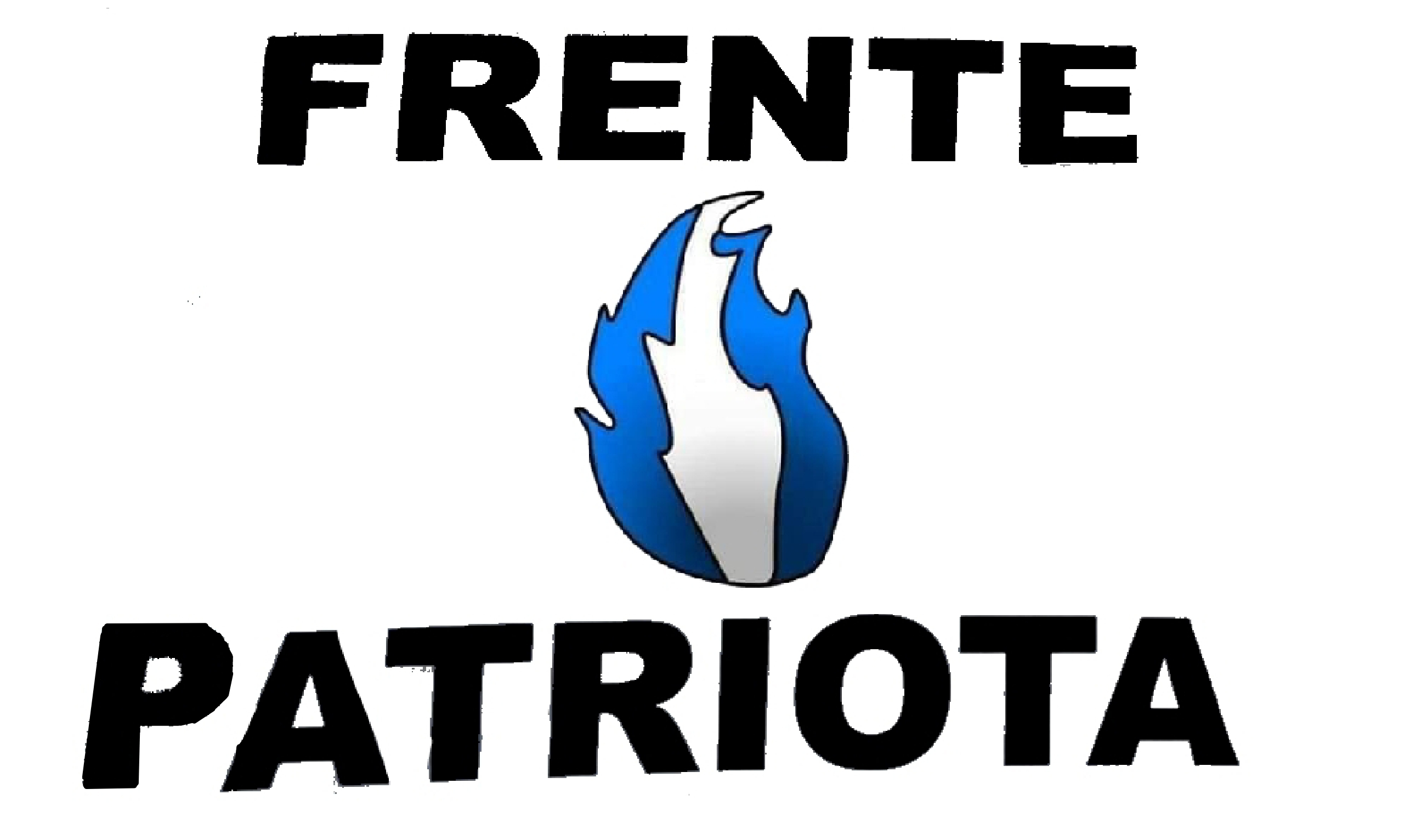
- Abbreviation: BV
- President: Alejandro Biondini
- Vicepresident: Leonardo Bariani
- Founded: 14 June 2017 (as an electoral alliance); 27 November 2018 (as a political party)
- Preceded by: Bandera Vecinal (Local Front); Gente en Acción (People in Action); Partido Nuevo Triunfo (New Triumph Party)
- Headquarters: Rivadavia Avenue 8811, Buenos Aires
- Youth wing: Juventud Nacionalista Darwin Passaponti
- Membership (2020): 7,817 (2020)
- Ideology: Neo-fascism; Orthodox Peronism; Neo-Nazism
- Political position: Far-right
- Colors: Light blue white
- Slogan: Nacionalismo o más de lo mismo (Nationalism or more of the same)
- Seats in the Senate: 0 / 72
- Seats in the Chamber of Deputies: 0 / 257
- Province Governors: 0 / 24

Website
- frentepatriota.org

Patriot Front (Spanish: Frente Patriota) is a far-right, neofascist, Argentine nationalist political party formed by the fusion of Bandera Vecinal and Gente en Acción parties in 2017, originally starting as a political alliance. It has been described as a ultranationalist, antisemitic, and militarist political party. Its leader is Alejandro Biondini, a far-right perennial candidate politician.

== History ==
It was officialized by the Court Supreme as a political alliance in 2017, after the union of Bandera Vecinal and Gente en Acción. It had a heavy controversy during 2017 Argentine legislative election in which the party was criticized because of receiving 20 million pesos for ballot print, but the National Electoral Council decided to decrease his funds, however the party printed all their ballots and presented their candidates nevertheless. Patriot Front took the case to the Jury and finally, the Court revoked the council's decision in favor of the party. In those elections, they gained 4,100 votes in Buenos Aires, and 28,500 votes in the province of Buenos Aires for national deputies and 31,500 for national senators.

== Ideology ==
The party describes itself as "a party of nationalist men and women united by the same thought and scale of values: the deep love for our Argentina and the firm determination to fight against its internal and external enemies". The party has been described as far-right, and that it embraces ultranationalist values. It is widely unpopular among the population, mainly because of its antisemitic and ultranationalist positions, its apologist position towards the military dictatorships of the country, and its support for a patriarchal society.

Patriot Front has an online manifesto. It follows an aggressive foreign policy, which includes good relations with neighbours, annexing the Falkland Islands, and severing diplomatic relations with the United Kingdom and Israel. It supports the Argentine Antarctica claim, and opposes colonialism. The Patriot Front supports restoring conscription.

== Presidential results ==
For the 2019 Argentine general election, Patriot Front presented Biondini as a candidate for president and Enrique Venturino as Biondini's running mate for vice president, but during primary vote, it obtained 0.24% and 58,944 of the total voters in the country. Having failed to have 1.5% of the required, it was disqualified from the elections.

In the 2023 Argentine general election, Biondini's son César Biondini ran for president under his father's coalition, alongside Mariel Avedaño as his running mate.
