= Argentine nationalism =

Nationalism of Argentine people and culture

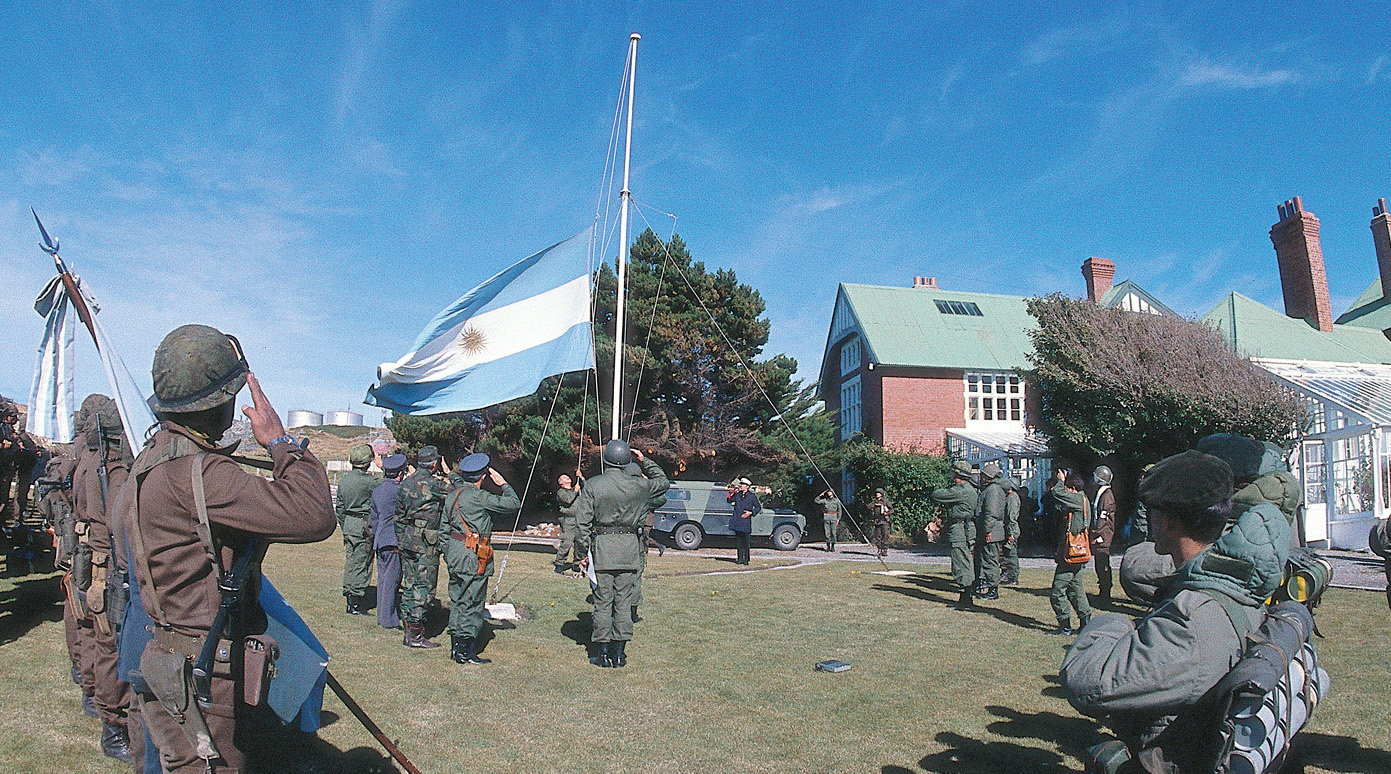
The raising of the Argentine flag after Operation Rosario. The Falklands War raised Argentine nationalism in 1982.

Argentine nationalism is the nationalism of Argentine people and Argentine culture. It surged during the War of Independence and the Civil Wars, and strengthened during the 1880s.

There were waves of renewed interest in nationalism in response to World War II, the National Reorganization Process, and the December 2001 riots. In another sense, the name "nationalism" is usually used to designate the exalted feelings of popular fervour after the Argentine triumphs in the Football World Cups of 1978, 1986 and 2022.

== History ==
Modern Argentina was once part of the Viceroyalty of the Río de la Plata, part of the Spanish Empire. The capture of the Spanish king during the Peninsular War began the Argentine War of Independence. It was based on the principle of the retroversion of the sovereignty to the people: with the king absent, the sovereignty returned to its subjects who were then capable to rule themselves.

Flag of Rosas, used by several nationalists with the text "Viva la Confederación Argentina!", "Mueran los Salvajes Unitarios!" (Long live the Argentine Confederation! Death to the savage Unitarians!)

This led to conflicts among the provinces of the viceroyalty: some factions wanted to maintain the country under the centralist organization used so far, others wanted to use a federalist system, and others wanted to secede their provinces as independent countries. This led to the Argentine Civil Wars. The Supreme Directors of the United Provinces of the Río de la Plata were centralists, and José Gervasio Artigas were federalists. Those groups evolved into the Unitarian Party and the Federal Party respectively.

The sense of national unity was increased during the French and Franco-British blockade of the Río de la Plata. Britain and France sought to prevent Juan Manuel de Rosas from interfering in Uruguay with a naval blockade, having the side effect of boosting the popularity of Rosas and increasing national solidarity.

In the 1880s Argentina seized Patagonia with the Conquest of the Desert, and secured its modern national limits. It was feared that the great European immigration wave to Argentina would dilute national identity, so Vicente Quesada and other historians promoted nationalism by establishing the idea of the viceroyalty as the "Grand Argentina", broke into several countries by the meddling of outside powers. This perception was reinforced by the diplomatic conflicts with Brazil of the time.

=== 20th century ===
Flag of Nacionalismo with the Cross of Saint George as a Christian symbol

Nationalism resurfaced during the 1930s. Opposed to Alvear's turnaround, in 1935, young Yrigoyenistas from a nationalist background founded FORJA (Fuerza Orientadora Radical de la Juventud Argentina, Radical Orienting Force of Argentine Youth), which had as leaders the Socialist Arturo Jauretche, Raúl Scalabrini Ortiz and Gabriel del Mazo. FORJA's motto was: "We are a colonial Argentina, we want to be a free Argentina." Among other things, FORJA denounced the silence of the government on many problems such as the creation of the Central Bank, "economic sacrifices imposed in benefices of foreign capitalism", petroleum politics, arbitrary military interventions, restrictions to freedom of opinion, incorporation to the League of Nations, suppression of relations with Russia, parliamentary investigations, the Senate crime, etc. and specially during World War II. Those nationalists thought that Argentina had an economic dependence of Britain, and that the country should not help Britain in the conflict but stay neutral. This nationalism led to the Revolution of '43, and during it to the emergence of Juan Domingo Perón. Perón reported the meddling of the ambassador of the United States Spruille Braden in the 1946 election, and won by a landslide. He nationalized several key tools of the economy of Argentina, and declared Argentine economic independence.

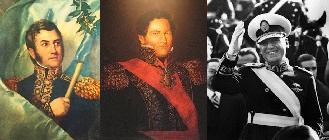
José de San Martín, Juan Manuel de Rosas and Juan Domingo Perón are seen by nationalist as a line of historical continuity.

The analogies between Perón and Rosas became explicit during the Revolución Libertadora, a coup that ousted Perón from power and banned Peronism. Eduardo Lonardi, de facto president, used the quote "Ni vencedores ni vencidos" (Spanish: "neither victors nor vanquished"), which was used by Justo José de Urquiza after deposing Rosas in the battle of Caseros. The official perspective was that Perón was "the second tyranny", the first one being Rosas, and that both ones should be equally rejected, and conversely both governments that ousted them should be praised. For this end they draw the line of historical continuity "May – Caseros – Libertadora", matching the coup with the May Revolution and the defeat of Rosas. This approach backfired. Perón was highly popular and the military coup unpopular; so Peronists embraced the comparison established between Rosas and Perón, but viewing him with a positive light instead. Nationalist historians draw then their own line of historical continuity, "San Martín – Rosas – Perón".

The Argentine Army promoted nationalist values during the Dirty War and the Falklands War. Both conflicts generated huge controversy. Nationalism declined in the following years as a result, increasing Americanization during the 1990s. Nationalism resurfaced again after the December 2001 riots in Argentina.

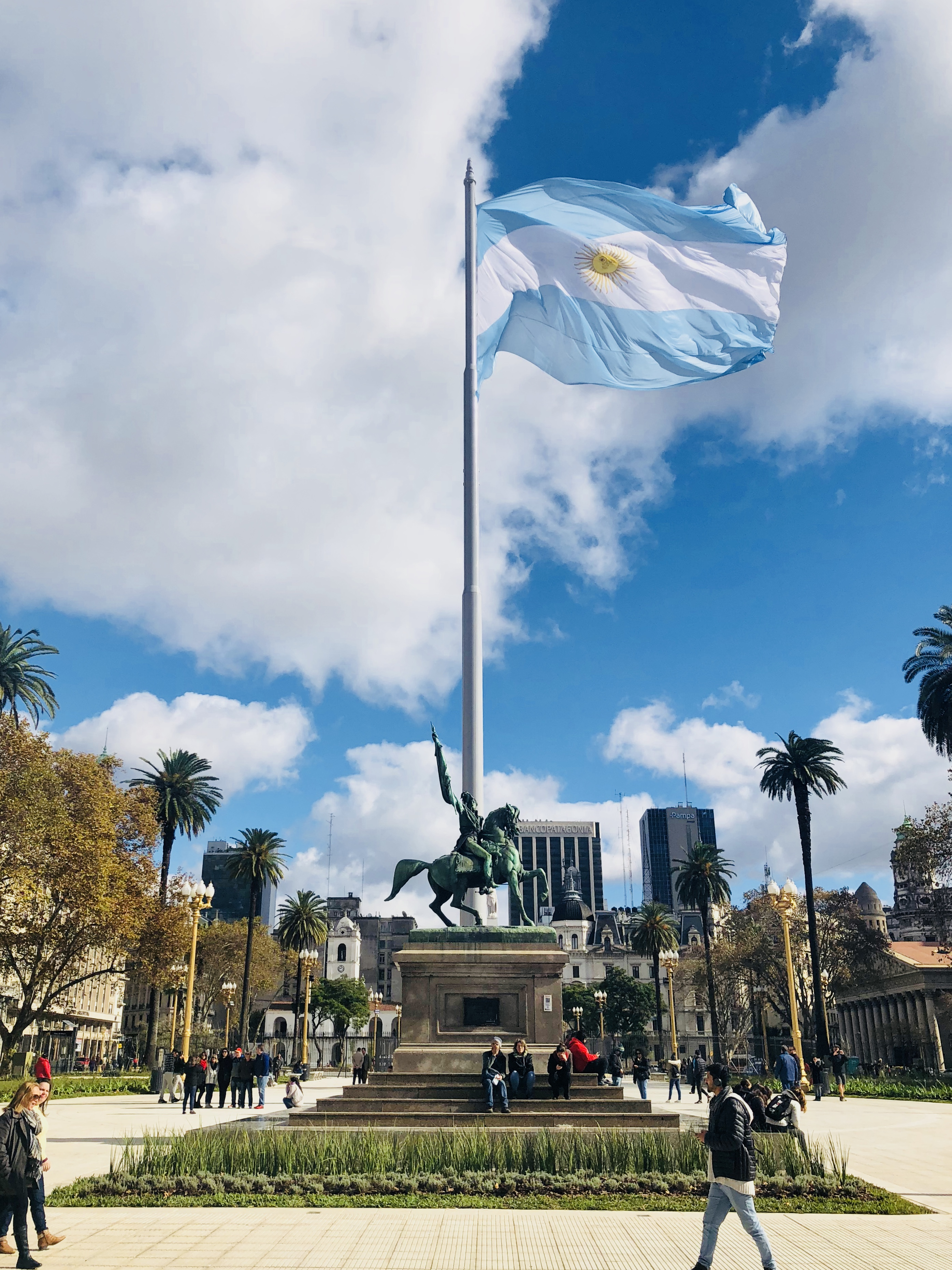
An equestrian monument of Manuel Belgrano, one of the greatest Argentine procers, in the Plaza de Mayo

Currently, Argentine nationalism is based mainly on the sovereignty dispute over the Falklands Islands, the dispute over the Georgias and Sandwich Islands of the South, the Argentine domain over Antarctica, the union between the Southern Cone and the discussion of the legacy of Argentine proceres such as José de San Martin, Manuel Belgrano, Juan Manuel de Rosas or Julio Argentino Roca, to whom different historiographical currents give different value in the formation of the postulated National identity.

== See also ==
- Manuel Gálvez, Argentine writer.
- Maurrassisme in Argentina, aristocratic variant of Argentine nationalism.
- Peronism, populist variant of Argentine nationalism.
  - Orthodox Peronism
- Drago Doctrine
- Argirópolis
- Panhispanism
- Mercosur
- Stereotypes of Argentines

== Bibliography ==
- Cavaleri, Paulo (2004). La restauración del Virreinato: orígenes del nacionalismo territorial Argentino (in Spanish). Buenos Aires: Universidad Nacional de Quilmes. ISBN 987-558-031-7.
- Chaneton, Juan Carlos (1998). Argentina: La ambigüedad como destino (in Spanish). Buenos Aires: Editorial Biblos.
- Devoto, Fernando; Nora Pagano (2009). Historia de la Historiografía Argentina (in Spanish). Buenos Aires: Sudamericana. ISBN 978-950-07-3076-1.
- Galasso, Norberto (2011), Historia de la Argentina, Tomo I&II, Buenos Aires: Colihue, ISBN 978-950-563-478-1
- Goebel, Michael (2011), Argentina's Partisan Past: Nationalism and the Politics of History, Liverpool: Liverpool University Press, ISBN 978-1846312380
- Rosa, José María (1974). Defensa y pérdida de nuestra independencia económica (in Spanish). Buenos Aires: A. Peña Lillo Editor.
