= Orthodox Peronism =

Argentine political ideology

Orthodox Peronism, Peronist Orthodoxy or National Justicialism was a faction within Peronism, a political movement in Argentina that adheres to the ideology and legacy of Juan Perón. It has been described as a conservative faction of Peronism. Orthodox Peronists claimed to represent the original policies of Perón, and reject any association with Marxism. Some of them were aligned with far-right elements, while others with the left. Orthodox Peronism also referred to the Peronist trade union faction that split from the “62 organizations" and that opposed the “legalists", who were more moderate and pragmatic. They were also known as “the hardliners", “the 62 standing with Perón" and they maintained an orthodox and verticalist stance. Orthodox Peronism had been in several conflicts with the Tendencia Revolucionaria, for example during the Ezeiza massacre.

== Origin of the denomination ==
The term "orthodox Peronism" emerged during the Peronist resistance following the 1955 coup, a period when historical revisionism took hold, deepening the connection between Peronism and nationalism. While the Peronist government had some ties with nationalists, it had not embraced a revisionist historical view, and the nationalists did not play a dominant role in government policy. American historian Michael A. Burdick wrote that despite the nationalist support for Perón, he did not embrace their ideology, sidelined them in favor of the trade unions and dissident socialists; the Peronist administration even dissolved some of the nationalist organizations. According to Burdick, "Nationalism of the Right died with the rise of Perón." It was only after 1955, amidst the context of resistance and under the influence of nationalist thought, that orthodox Peronism began to take shape, in which nationalists reappropriated and redefined key elements of Perón’s original discourse.

This convergence was fraught with tensions. The most intransigent and uncompromising sectors of Peronism emerged during this time, rejecting any form of negotiation with the government. These groups distanced themselves from the more conciliatory tendencies that arose within Peronism in the 1960s, including the neoperonist and vandorist factions. When referring to the traditional orthodox current, it is important to recognize a coalition of unions and organizations that, despite their loyalty to Peronist verticality, initially opposed leaders like Rodolfo Ponce and right-wing unionism. Many of these union leaders gained their influence during the labor conflicts of the early 1960s, such as the "Plan de Huerta Grande" and the "Plan de Lucha" in 1964. This orthodox faction was largely represented by the Secretaries of the AEC (Ezequiel Crisol) and the UOM (Albertano Quiroga), supported by unions with large memberships, though they wielded limited political influence at the time.

Peronism underwent a profound transformation during the campaign "Luche y Vuelve", which culminated in Perón's return to power in 1973. Tensions between the union sectors and the Peronist left, which had backed Cámpora’s government, escalated when Perón took office. The far-left faction of Peronism represented by the Montoneros entered a conflict with the Peronist trade unions, which forced Perón to give concessions to labour bureaucracy and act against the left-wing Peronists, given the threat of trade unions turning against Perón. According to Ronaldo Munck, Perón did not differ from Tendencia Revolucionaria in terms of economic ideology, but rather mass mobilisation: "The purely anti-imperialist and anti-oligarchic political programme of the Montoneros ("national socialism") was not incompatible with Peron's economic project of "national reconstruction", but their power of mass mobilisation was."

According to Donald C. Hodges, "three forces contended for Peron's ear during his third government and for his mantle after he died: montonerismo on the Left, lopezreguismo on the Right, and vandorismo in the Center." Montoneros refused to ally themselves with the vandorist trade unions in order to isolate López, seeing their relationship with the labor bureaucracy as antagonistic instead. This led to López faction successfully aligning itself with the Peronist trade unions. The traditional Peronist sectors—union orthodoxy and right-wing Peronists—formed a verticalist alliance that established a new Peronist orthodoxy. This group sought to marginalize and suppress the left-wing faction of the movement, which held onto its revolutionary ideals.

Orthodox Peronism from this point onward came to represent the factions that, in the name of verticalism, opposed any alignment with Marxism or the Peronist left. Those loyal to Perón's wife, Isabel Martínez de Perón, began to identify themselves as orthodox Peronists, defending the "Peronist homeland" against the "socialist homeland" advocated by the left-wing Revolutionary Tendency. During Raúl Lastiri’s interim presidency and after Perón’s death, this new orthodox coalition used both institutional and extralegal means to push out and marginalize the left-wing heterodoxy, which included leftist Peronists and their aligned governors and officials. Hodges argues that while López's influence over Isabel's government is often exaggerated, the left-wing and centrist factions of Peronism often fought each other, and pursued "a policy of armed confrontation with Isabel Peron, whereas the correct strategy would have been to focus on their common enemy, the Lopezreguist conspiracy. This led to increased political violence within the Peronist movement, further aggravated by armed guerrilla activities, marking one of the most violent periods in Argentina’s history.

Other Peronist factions - left-wing Peronists, trade unions, and even previously pro-López groups, started opposing Isabel's government. This prompted Isabel to declare a "state of siege" against the protests and clashes, though she did not outlaw the Montoneros or ban the trade union militias. Isabel-López administration clashed not only with Peronist-socialist guerillas, but also with "students, left-leaning intellectuals and artists, trade union leaders, journalists, lawyers". Peronist trade unions became a focal point of the opposition to the Isabel government - as López's efforts to control trade unions faltered, the CGT organized mass demonstrations the national, general strike in July 1975. The union militancy led to the dismissal of López, but by then Isabel found herself isolated and unpopular, and the military plotted and executed a coup against her to prevent the victorious Peronist trade unions from taking power.

== Ideology ==
=== Until 1973 ===
The term "Orthodox Peronism" emerged following the overthrow of Perón in 1955, and referred to the sectors of Peronist resistance that were most hostile towards and most reluctact towards any kind of agreement with anti-Peronist governments. They were characterized by rejection of conciliatory factions, known as Neo-Peronism or Vandorism, in the 1960s, which in turn was regarded as "heterodox".

This Orthodox Peronism encompassed those Peronist sectors that followed the Peronist ideals to the letter and opposed the neo-Peronist sectors of the time, as Perón expressed in his speeches:

“We have, yes, an ideology and a doctrine within which we are developing. Some are on the right of that ideology and others are on the left, but they are in the ideology. Those on the right protest because these on the left are, and those on the left protest because those on the right are, and I don’t know which of the two is right in the protest. But that is something that does not interest me."
(Spanish: Tenemos, sí, una ideología y una doctrina dentro de la cual nos vamos desarrollando. Algunos están a la derecha de esa ideología y otros están a la izquierda, pero están en la ideología. Los de la derecha protestan porque estos de la izquierda están, y los de la izquierda protestan porque están los de la derecha, y yo no sé cuál de los dos tiene razón en la protesta. Pero esa es una cosa que a mí no me interesa.)

— Juan Domingo Perón, 8 de setiembre de 1973

It was mainly organized under the orthodox union leadership, and functioned as self-identification adopted by some traditional Peronist trade unions. This traditional orthodoxy was part of the National Transference Table.

=== Since 1973 ===
With the return of Perón, Orthodox Peronism positioned itself against the revolutionary youth sectors of Peronism and the "Homeland Socialist", which it considered alien to the movement; and the reaffirmation of its position in the Third World, distancing itself from both United States and the Soviet Union. It also opposed Perón's ideological declaration from the 1970s, such as his Peronism "is one form of socialism", and that "Marxism is not only not in contradiction with the Peronist Movement, but complements it".

Perón himself did not consider right-wing Peronists as "orthodox" or the most loyal faction; up to 1973, Perón supported the left-wing "special formations" of Peronism and denigrated several men who would later claim the label of Orthodox Peronism. Juan Luis Besoky writes that in fact many Orthodox Peronists were either newcomers to the Peronist movement, or were reluctant to follow Perón's directives, contrary to their label. Even following Perón's conflict with the Montoneros between 1973 and 1974, he did not desire to abandon the Peronist left and sought to restore his trust in his last speech from June 1974, where he denounced "the oligarchy and the pressures exerted by imperialism upon his government", seen as an implication that he was being manipulated by the Peronist right.

Orthodox Peronism was understood in two ways. First was a tendency characterized by total alliegance to Juan Perón and his wife María Estela from 1973 onwards, opposition to Revolutionary Peronism, and affirmation of Perón's Third Position, based on anti-USA and anti-Soviet foreign policy. This tendency did not see itself as right-wing. Besoky argues that this Peronist sector limited itself to rejecting linking Peronism with Marxism and identification of Perón with Juan Manuel de Rosas; while this sector had contact with right-wing nationalists, they often clashed. Second understanding of Orthodox Peronism is synonymous to "Peronist right" - right-wing nationalist tendencies within Peronism that embraced violent stance towards the Peronist left, antisemitism, and various conspiracy theories.

As such, Orthodox Peronism became a very broad term "encompassing a spectrum ranging from old-guard Justicialists who simply did not subscribe to the most strident slogans of revolutionary Peronism, to the most furiously anti-Marxist and anti-Semitic expressions of the far right." Because of this, some scholars proposed the term "Restorationist Peronism" to distinguish Orthodox Peronism and Peronist right. According to Lourdes Murri, Peronist right defined itself against "Marxist infiltration" of the left, although Peronist right did not consider itself orthodox Peronists. Peronist right, unlike Orthodox Peronism, established itself in the 1970s and was characterized by political violence against the left, as well as sharp opposition to the liberal and oligarchic right, identified with the ‘old Argentina’.

Besoky argues that despite redefining the meaning of Orthodox Peronism, the Peronist right was "almost mirroring the characterisation used for the Peronist left"; Orthodox Peronism operated on the fringes of the Peronist movement, reintepreted the nature and possibilities of Peronism during Perón's exile, and tried to incorporate right-wing nationalism into Peronism while also redefining Peronist project and the role of Perón himself. Peronist right structured its identification of enemies around the concept of "synarchy", which encompassed supposed enemies of Peronism such as Judaism, Zionism, Marxism, liberalism, the Jesuits, and progressivism. The concept of "synarchy" was used both by the Peronist right and Orthodox Peronists, yet it was never central in Perón's own thinking. Peronist right did not see itself as right-wing; Besoky writes that "for the Peronist right, Peronism was neither left-wing nor right-wing", and the "label they did accept was that of Peronists, or even nationalists and Catholics, since for them these terms were synonymous".

==== Allegations of fascism ====
Fascism was also a qualification that some groups were seen as adhering to, such as the Nationalist Liberation Alliance and the Tacuara Nationalist Movement. Both Isabel Perón and José López Rega ("the wizard") were accused of having shown tuning for fascism or Falangism. López was also part of the Masonic lodge Propaganda Due, led by the fascist Licio Gelli. Isabel Perón was seen performing the Roman salute, characteristic of the movements akin to fascism.

Others scholars dispute the fascist nature of Orthodox Peronism - Hodges argues that unlike military regimes in Chile or Brazil, Orthodox Peronism continued to favor a policy of aligning with the Third World, represented a social pact of nationalist sectors with organized labor rather than being "intent on destroying the labor movement through an alliance with imperialism", and had more in common with the "Mexican model of authoritative democracy than with the military repressive regimes in Latin America". This led Hodges to argue that rather than being a form of fascism, it was "an alternative to a fascist model". Likewise, Goran Petrovic Lotina and Théo Aiolfi wrote that "Peronism was never a form of fascism during Juan Perón's first presidencies (1946-55). Nor was Peronism fascistic in its subsequent incarnations over the past seventy-five years from the 1970s revolutionary leftist Montonero guerilla organization to the neoliberal centre-right presidency of Carlos Menem."

Juan L. Besoky has argued that it is an oversimplification to see Orthodox Peronism as "fascist, authoritarian and anti-democratic", or as "a synthesis of everything that is reprehensible in politics". Similarly, Juan Luis Carnagui of the National University of La Plata has criticized identifying the movement with "fascism, violence and authoritarianism, amongst others" as unhelpful and reducing it to "everything abhorrent in politics". James P. Brennan argues that Orthodox Peronism was even less similar to fascism that original Peronism, stating that "during the period from 1946 to 1955, unlike the second Peronist government, from 1973 to 1976, there were certain similarities to fascism, especially with respect to the vast propaganda machine and a certain totalitarian aspiration", and that "the Peronism in power between 1973 and 1976 was not a repetition of the intolerant practices of the period from 1950 to 1955."

==== Economics ====
Economically, Orthodox Peronist government has been described as redistributive. Andrés Lazzarini and Gabriel Brondino wrote that the "Peronist government (1973–1976) sought to redistribute the higher income of the external sector by increasing the powers of the Juntas Nacional de Carne y Granos, which monopolised the foreign trade of such products", James P. Brennan wrote that the "Peronist governments of 1946-1955 and 1973-1976 directed their efforts toward distributive and industrializing policies." However, the López faction was described as neoliberal given that one of its ministers of economy, Celestino Rodrigo (1974-1975), applied an neoliberal economic program vulgarly known as "Rodrigazo". However, in 1975 Rodrigo was replaced with Pedro José Bonanni, who in turn pursued wage increases. After Bonanni resigned, the minister of economy of the Orthodox Peronist government became Antonio Cafiero, who restored Perón's 1973 Social Pact but gained ire of the business sectors because he favored trade unions, granting a 27% salary increase without consulting business. According to Sara J. Weir, the leader of the Orthodox Peronist government, Isabel Perón, "continued the policies of her husband with few exceptions — this meant keeping wages and subsidies high".

Orthodox Peronism was described as supportive of trade unions. In 1975, the Orthodox Peronist government promoted collective bargaining agreements in all industries, with the negotiations covering the entirety of the Argentine salaried workforce. The 1975 negotiations were "considered a triumph of the union movement, one in which concessions to workers had reached a peak." Under Isabel, Peronist trade unions played a key role in the policy-making process. Isabel implemented a 45% wage increase to compensate for the previous Rodrigazo policies, and nationalized Shell and Esso gas stations, along with strengthening protectionist policies through cancellation of imports. Like previous Peronist governments, Isabel faced opposition from the right-wing business groups:

Right-wing business groups began to mobilize against the democratic regime after Juan Perón’s death. The most visible pro-coup business organization was a new association, formed in August 1975, the Permanent Assembly of Business Associations (Asamblea Permanente de Entidades Gremiales Empresarias, APEGE). […] From its creation, the APEGE worked to undermine Isabel Perón’s government, denounced the economic and social chaos, demanded drastic policy changes, and in sotto voce encouraged a coup. Big agricultural producers launched some de facto strikes against the government in September and November 1975, provoking food shortages.

Manuel Funke, Moritz Schularick and Christoph Trebesch have classified Isabel Perón as left-wing, and argue that she should be seen as left-wing populist, despite the presence of right-wing Peronist tendencies under her rule:

With a view to the economy, Juan and Isabel Peron in the 1970s “represented the traditional constituency and policies of the Peronist movement, which were strongly based on labor unions and gave priority to state intervention, import substitution, and the redistribution of income”. We therefore code her as a left-wing populist, in line with her husband. At the same time, however, it is important to emphasize that Isabel Peron also “favored [...] right-wing groups”, whose goal, among other goals, was “moving toward market-oriented policies” (Sturzenegger 1991, 83). This, however, did not lead to major shifts in her economic rhetoric and policies […].

Isabel Perón has also been described as left-wing by scholars such as Sebastián Edwards, Sebastian Fonseca, C. J. Halter of Texas State University, and Sofia Chain of the University of San Francisco. Martin Edwin Andersen and John Dinges described the government of Isabel Perón as left-wing; it was also considered left-wing Peronist by political scientists Paul Crossey and Bob Pease, as well as by Alessandro Salamone of the Monash International Affairs Society. Her government was also supported by sectors of the Peronist left, such as the Revolutionary Communist Party, which regarded her government as anti-imperialist. Jairo Lugo-Ocando has described Isabel Perón's government as democratic.

== Orthodoxy organizations ==
In the seventies, there were several terrorist organizations that adhered to this Peronism. Among the main groups of Orthodox Peronism include the Orthodox Peronist Youth, with Adrián Curi as executive secretary; Concentration of the Peronist Youth, with Martín Salas as organization secretary; Peronist Union Youth, which has Claudio Mazota in the union secretariat; the Iron Guard, the Falangist National University Concentration; the Peronist Youth of the Argentine Republic, National Student Front, which had Víctor Lorefice as press and finance secretary, the Tacuara Nationalist Movement was also part of this movement. The Alianza Anticomunista Argentina (AAA) also is included, although it is not yet clear if it is its own political organization, a mere death squad, or a confederation of right-wing groups. Other minor groups such as the Comando Rucci are also part of this denomination.

== Present ==
Orthodox Peronism had disappeared in the 1970s and 1980s, suppressed by first the military junta and then the post-dictatorship forces. However, the term "orthodox Peronism" is still claimed by some modern Peronists. It is used to describe groups such as the Popular Dignity party (currently the Federal Republican Encounter), the Second Republic Project, the Popular Party, the Principles and Values Party, Unite for Freedom and Dignity (successor of People's Countryside Party and Movement for Dignity and Independence), Federal Patriot Front (previously known as New Triumph Party, Alternativa Social and Bandera Vecinal), parts of Youth and Dignity Left Movement and Federal Commitment. Some Federal Peronists, characterized by rejecting the left wing of Peronism, Kirchnerism, self-identify as Orthodox Peronists, including one of the founders of the Federal Peronist movement, Alberto Rodriguez Saá. FPF leader Alejandro Biondini meanwhile rejects both Kirchnerism and Menemism.
