= Iron Guard (Argentina) =

Iron Guard Guardia de Hierro
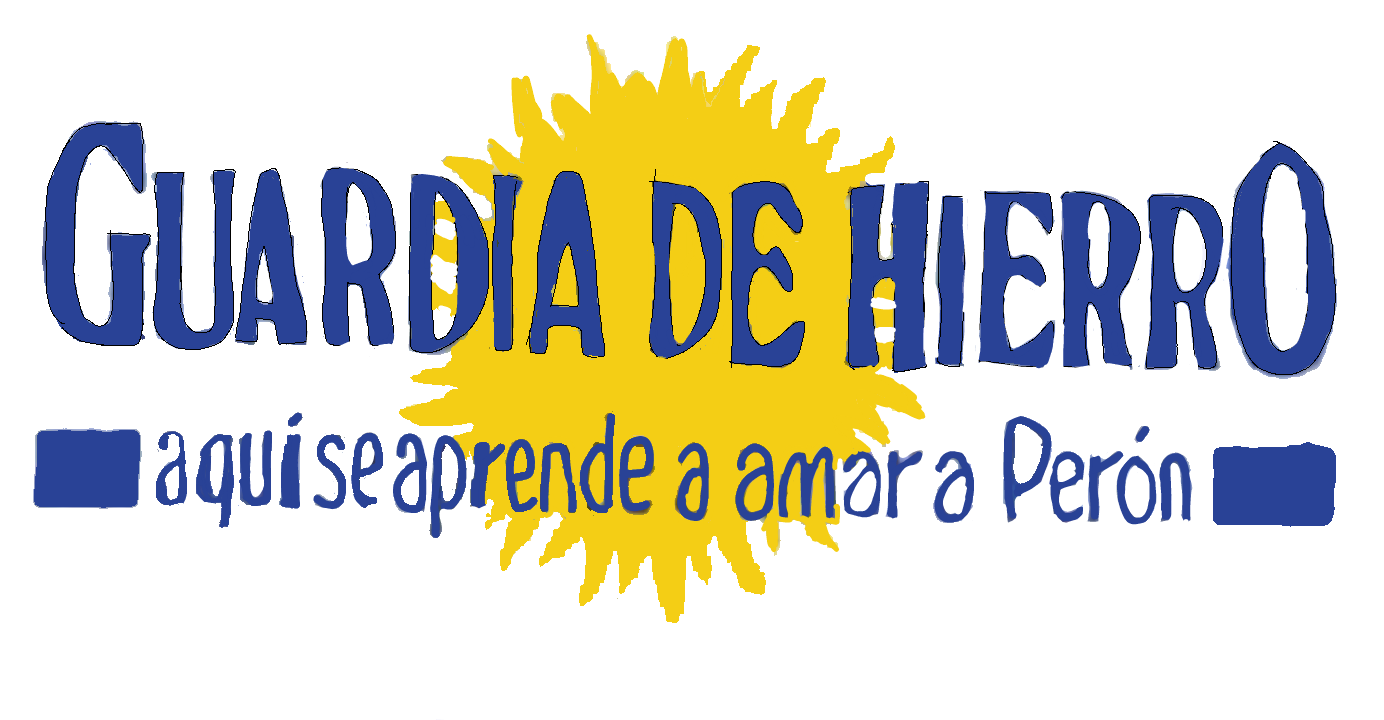
- President: Alejandro "Gallego" Álvarez
- Founder: Alejandro "Gallego" Álvarez, Héctor Tristán
- Founded: 1962; 64 years ago
- Dissolved: 1974; 52 years ago
- Headquarters: Buenos Aires, Argentina
- Ideology: Orthodox Peronism; Neo-fascism; Before 1970: Trotskyism; Marxism
- Political position: Far-right; Before 1970: Far-left
- Politics of Argentina; Political parties; Elections; Other intelectuals, think that Iron Guard is a centrist agrupation, at a more or less equidistant distance from the right and left of Peronism.

The Iron Guard (Spanish: Guardia de Hierro; abbreviated as GH) was an Argentine political organisation with its headquarters in Buenos Aires. It followed the political movement of Peronism, more precisely its orthodox variant. It was founded in 1962 by Alejandro "Gallego" Álvarez and Héctor Tristán, both members of the Peronist resistance. These two were against the policies of Augusto Vandor and the dictatorship of Juan Carlos Onganía. Left-wing members like Roberto Grabois, a socialist, would later join the Iron Guard. Other notable members were Amelia Podetti (a philosopher and writer), Julio Bárbaro (a politician) and Roberto Roitman (an economist). The Iron Guard was related to the Student National Front (FEN).

After the death of Juan Perón, the group was dissolved, although a "sector" led by Álvarez continued its political activities. This sector allied with Isabel Perón in 1975 to avoid a possible coup.

== See also ==
- Iron Guard, the Romanian movement and party of the same name
