= List of Argentine philosophers =

A list of notable Argentine philosophers:

== A ==
- Tomás Abraham
- Coriolano Alberini
- Alberto Buela
- Agustín Álvarez

== B ==
- Alberto Baldrich
- Jaime Barylko
- Mario Bunge

== C ==
- Samuel Cabanchik
- Ángel Cappelletti
- Adolfo Carpio
- Manuel Casas
- Nicolás Casullo
- Alberto Caturelli
- Buenaventura Chumillas Laguía
- Conrado Eggers Lan
- Carlos Cossio

== D ==
- Fernando Demaría
- Jorge Dorio
- Enrique Dussel

== E ==
- Ernesto Garzón Valdés

== F ==
- Ángel Faretta
- José Pablo Feinmann
- Eduardo H. Flichman
- Ricardo Forster
- Risieri Frondizi

== G ==
- Werner Goldschmidt

== H ==
- Daniel Herrendorf

== I ==
- José Ingenieros

== J ==
- Amadeo Jacques
- Christofredo Jakob

== K ==
- Gregorio Klimovsky
- Alejandro Korn
- Santiago Kovadloff

== L ==
- Ernesto Laclau
- Juan Crisóstomo Lafinur

== M ==
- Tomás Maldonado
- Ricardo Maliandi
- Hugo Celso Felipe Mansilla
- Víctor Massuh
- Julio Meinvielle
- Rodolfo Mondolfo

== N ==
- Carlos Santiago Nino

== O ==
- José Oliva Nogueira
- Oscar Terán

== P ==
- Gustavo Daniel Perednik
- Alejandro Piscitelli

== R ==
- Eduardo Rabossi
- Rodolfo Kusch
- Arturo Andrés Roig
- Francisco Romero
- Alberto Rougès
- León Rozitchner

== S ==
- Carlos Alberto Sacheri
- Beatriz Sarlo
- Raúl Scalabrini Ortiz
- Friedrich Schickendantz
- Federico Schuster
- Juan José Sebreli

== V ==
- Ángel Vasallo
- Gustavo Varela
- Debret Viana
- Vicente Fatone
