= Tacuara Nationalist Movement =

Defunct Argentine fascist movement

Tacuara Nationalist Movement Movimiento Nacionalista Tacuara
- Leader: Alberto Ezcurra Uriburu; José Joe Baxter; Óscar Denovi; Eduardo Rosa
- Founded: 1957; 69 years ago
- Dissolved: 1966; 60 years ago
- Ideology: Neo-Nazism; Fascism; Falangism; Clerical fascism National syndicalism Catholic nationalism Factions: National Bolshevism; Nationalist socialism Revolutionary Peronism; Communism; Anti-Peronism
- Political position: Far-right; Factions: Left-wing to far-left

The Tacuara Nationalist Movement (Spanish: Movimiento Nacionalista Tacuara, MNT) was an Argentine far-right fascist movement. While officially established in 1957, its activities started in 1955, and continued through the 1960s. Directly inspired by Julio Meinvielle's Catholic pronouncements, Tacuara defended nationalist, Catholic, anti-liberal, anti-communist, antisemitic, and anti-democratic ideas, and had as its first model José Antonio Primo de Rivera's fascist Falange Española.

Its main leaders were Alberto Ezcurra Uriburu, José Luis "Joe" Baxter, Óscar Denovi, and Eduardo Rosa. Various ideologically contradictory movements emerged from this group. After three important splits in the early 1960s, the police cracked down on most factions in March 1964. A year later, the entire MNT was outlawed by then president Arturo Illia of the Radical Civic Union. The movement gradually disintegrated as many members became fascinated with left-wing Peronism and communism, while others incorporated neo-Nazi elements. In 1965, the Argentine National Congress classified Tacuara as a communist rather than a fascist organisation.

Composed of young people from right-wing backgrounds, it has been called the "first urban guerrilla group in Argentina". A tacuara was a rudimentary lance used by gaucho militias (known in Argentina as Montoneras) during the Argentine war of independence. It consisted of a knife blade tied to a stalk of taquara cane. It has been rumored that the organization was secretly run by the son of Adolf Eichmann.

== 1957 creation and antecedents ==
The MNT was officially established at the end of 1957. First under the name of Grupo Tacuara de la Juventud Nacionalista (Tacuara Group of Nationalist Youth). It was mostly formed by young offspring of Buenos Aires’ high and middle bourgeoisie (almost all males), who were active in the Unión de Estudiantes Nacionalistas Secundarios (UNES) students’ union and the Alianza de la Juventud Nacionalista (Alliance of Nationalist Youth). Although strongest in Buenos Aires, during its peak the group spread all over the country, especially in Rosario, Santa Fe and Tandil. They propagandized through both their own publications and various nationalist periodicals, one of which in fact bore the name Tacuara; but it had been founded back in 1945, during the military government headed by Edelmiro Farrell, by a group of students affiliated to the UNES. Argentina, an important economic power at the beginning of the 20th century, had been hit hard by the 1929 Great Depression. Furthermore—as in other parts of the world—it was affected by a wave of authoritarianism. Argentine nationalism was influenced by Fascism and Nazism. This influence was reinforced by the arrival of Nazi fugitives fleeing from Germany after 1945.

== Ideology ==
The MNT inherited from the UNES’ aesthetics, inspired by Nazi parades and rituals. They called each other “comrades”, instead of using their first names. They wore gray armbands with the insignia of the Knights of Malta. Consisting of youths educated in military high-schools and religious schools, the MNT took advantage of the conflict arising from the enactment of the law on secularization of schools a few years earlier. They advocated reestablishment of Catholic teaching, suppressed by Perón's government before his overthrow in 1955, and struggled against “Judaism” and the left-wing. They opposed what they named “liberal democracy” and admired Hitler and Mussolini. Inspired by Primo de Rivera, founder of the Spanish Falange, "Tacuara rejected elections and the parliamentary system, were strongly anti-Marxist, revindicated social justice, proclaimed the Fatherland's and the Catholic religion's superiority over any other and exalted violence as a form of permanent mobilization."

Inspired by neo-fascist figures such as the French fascist Jacques de Mahieu, Tacuara propagated a neo-fascist ideology based on appeals for a "national-syndicalist revolution". They formulated a "basic revolutionary program" that was explicitly linked to the Twenty-Six Points of the Spanish Falange. Tacuara was seen as a part of the larger trend within Latin American conservatism to introduce both national-syndicalist elements as well as embrace cult of violence. The revolutionary program of Tacuara included economic measures such as the abolition of large estates and the nationalisation of banking and foreign trade. The ideology of Tacuara also had roots in Catholic nationalism, promoting a strong revolutionary corporatist state while rejecting liberalism, capitalism and liberal democracy as enemies. Initially anti-socialist and anti-communist, the group would gradually fall victim to numerous splits as many members, including the Tacuara leader José Joe Baxter, became fascinated with Marxism and the Cuban Revolution.

Political scientist Esteban Campos wrote: "The ideology of the MNT was rooted in the cultural universe of the Argentine and European right between the wars: the Falangism of José Antonio Primo de Rivera, the national-syndicalism of Ramiro Ledesma Ramos, the revisionist historiography and Catholic anti-Semitism of Father Julio Meinvielle, to which was added the communitarian doctrine of Jaime María de Mahieu. In their own cultural categories, the Tacuara supporters were neither left-wing nor right-wing, as they saw themselves as a synthesis that transcended both currents." One of the main leaders of Tacuara, Alberto Ezcurra Uriburu, wrote:

We start from a Catholic spiritual foundation, politically nationalist, unionist and community-based in economic terms. By left we mean a revolutionary social and economic reorganisation. The right is understood as the defence of religion, tradition and the homeland, and we want neither one nor the other, but a synthesis of both, in order to break with the moulds of the left and the right. We want a social revolution, but with the sign of God and the flag of the homeland.

Given this syncretism, Tacuara was internally heterogeneous and grew unstable given the conflicts and confrontation between its right-wing and left-wing factions. In October 1960, a faction close to Father Julio Meinvielle broke away from the MNT to found the Nationalist Restoration Guard (GRN), accusing the main Uriburu's faction of having been taking over by "Fidelism, Trotskyism and atheism". Another group led by Cardo Cabo split in May 1961 and created the New Argentina Movement (MNA), proclaiming itself Peronist and joining the Peronist trade unions. In December 1962, Tacuara suffered the most devastating split, as the faction of Tacuara co-leaders Joe Baxter, José Luis Nell and Alfredo Ossorio formed the Revolutionary Nationalist Tacuara Movement (MNRT), which aligned itself close to Marxism and left-wing Peronism, defining itself as 'Peronist and revolutionary', proclaiming a 'national and social revolution', and identifying with socialist movements of the Third World.

== From Perón (1945) to Frondizi (1958) ==
When Juan Perón acceded to the presidency for the first time in 1945, nationalists in Argentina debated on whether to support him or not. At first, most decided to join him. However, two events pushed them apart from him. First was a bombing which occurred during turmoil over the hemispheric political initiative, the Acta de Chapultépec (signed by Edelmiro Farrell, it would be approved in 1947). This was a plan aimed at Latin America's integration under the leadership of the United States. Within Argentina, this initiative was supported by both Perón's personal delegate, John William Cooke, and one of Perón's main opposition leaders, Arturo Frondizi of the Radical Civic Union (the future president of Argentina). Perón himself reportedly opposed to the Acta but was rumored to be considering acceding, under pressure from military and business interests. Nationalists organized a protest against it, which ended with 200 being jailed. Agitation continued. On April 15, 1953, two bombs exploded in Plaza de Mayo, killing five. The second event which pushed various nationalists to oppose Perón was his suppression of mandatory Catholic education in 1954. Thus, the nationalists acclaimed Eduardo Lonardi's arrival by plane to the chanting of Cristo Vence (Christ Prevails), in the aftermath of Perón's ouster in September 1955. However, as early as 1956, the nationalists returned to opposing the government, upset by the assumption of control of the junta by General Aramburu, who was allied with the old Conservative establishment.

When democratically elected president Arturo Frondizi took office in 1958, he enforced a nonreligious education program, alongside his brother, Risieri Frondizi, rector of the University of Buenos Aires (UBA). This new attack against clericalism prompted a violent response from the Catholic nationalist sectors. Created the year before, the Tacuara movement took advantage of the weakening of the Peronism movement (Perón was living in exile in Spain under Franco) and became a major opposition force. It was at its strongest between 1960 and 1962, attracting many young people. These included José Luis "Joe" Baxter, a nationalist and anti-imperialist born to working class Irish immigrants, who became the future founder of the Guevarist guerrilla movement (the ERP) as well as Alberto Ignacio Ezcurra Uriburu, who had been expelled from the Jesuits and remained a staunch defender of the radical right ideology. Moisés Ikonicoff, a Jewish socialist who opposed Peronism in 1955, sometimes attended MNT meetings. Carlos Mugica, a young theology teacher, who broke with the group after coming to support Che Guevara, and finally turned toward Peronism (before being killed by the Triple A death squad in 1974). Three brothers surnamed Guevara Lynch, who were cousins of Che, also participated in the MNT.

== 1960s splits ==
The MNT split into along ideological lines between 1960 and 1963. Many of the new members were attracted by Peronism, while some of the old leaders were starting a slow and progressive process of ideological transformation towards Peronism and the left-wing. The 1959 Cuban Revolution was a major change and an axis of division between political forces. Joe Baxter was fascinated by the Cuban experience and its stand against the US — which only became complete in 1961, when Fidel Castro announced his choice in favor of socialism. At that time, Alberto Ezcurra and his followers became serious opponents of the Cuban revolution. Furthermore, many activists struggled alongside the trade unions and associated themselves with the Peronist Youth (JP), which wasn't well viewed in all sectors of the MNT. Thus, in March 1960, the priest Meinvielle, opposed to the alliance with Peronism, accused the original core of Marxist deviations. Meinvielle then created the Guardia Restauradora Nacionalista (GRN) which imposed the membership requirements of European ancestry and a family history of at least six generations of residence in Argentina.

The next split, on June 9, 1961, was the Movimiento Nueva Argentina (MNA; New Argentina Movement), headed by Dardo Cabo, which strove for Perón's return from exile. The MNA was one of the first right-wing Peronist organizations. MNA was launched in commemoration of General Juan José Valle's Peronist uprising in 1956. It became the ancestor of all modern Catholic nationalist groups in Argentina. During the visit of former United States President Dwight Eisenhower to Argentina in February 1962, the MNT headed nationalist demonstrations against him, leading to the imprisonment of several of their leaders, among them José Luis "Joe" Baxter. Baxter also established Arab ties that year.

During the 1962 elections, the MNT presented candidates in Buenos Aires (city) and in Entre Ríos (province) through the Unión Cívica Nacionalista (Civic Nationalist Union). However, sectors headed by José Luis "Joe" Baxter and José Luis Nell decided to join the Peronist movement (Justicialist party) believing in its revolutionary capacities. With Perón in exile, the movement named after him attracted people of various ideologies from various backgrounds. This heterogeneity would end with his return, during the 1973 Ezeiza Massacre.

Tacuara was described by the Argentine representative to the UN as Nazis, in response to Ahmad Shukeiri having saluted them in November 1962 while calling for others to adopt its principles. At the time it was also described by ADL as "neo-Nazi storm troop gang" and by others as Neo-Nazis, especially after the notorious June 1962 attack on Graciela Sirota, tattooing on her breast a Nazi swastika, as revenge for bringing Adolf Eichmann to justice in Israel. Both the attack on Graciela Sirota and the Shukeiri salute months later were marked as "the dark days of 1962".

=== MNRT ===
Ezcurra's MNT was expecting a military coup and his group progressively became more and more instrumentalized by the secret services in the framework of a strategy of tension which was to justify the repression of the left-wing. In 1963, after the Aramburu decree which banned even the use of Perón's name, and the subsequent prohibition of Peronism because of its success in the previous elections, José Luis "Joe" Baxter and José Luis Nell created the Movimiento Nacionalista Revolucionario Tacuara (MNRT, Revolutionary Nationalist Tacuara Movement) which, without forsaking nationalism, had turned away from antisemitism and extreme right-wing politics, leaning towards a Peronist left. Baxter declared that the MNRT is "an opening to the Left" and adopted slogans such as “War on Imperialism” and “On March toward National Liberation". The MNRT called itself a "strongly anti-imperialist movement" and stated that it would model itself on the Algerian revolution and the Peronist movement. Baxter noted that while his movement still adhered to Catholic nationalist tenets, they left Tacuara because it became "shock troops of the oligarchy”. MNRT also condemned antisemitism, calling it "artificial", “diversionary” and dismissive of “honest Jews". At the same time, Dexter added: “No one can call Fidel Castro an anti-Semite, but as a Cuban nationalist he has done away with the exploiters and so most of the Jews had to leave."

The Tacuaristas of the MNRT considered themselves ‘Peronists and revolutionaries’ and were inspired by Nasserism in Egypt, the National Liberation Front of Algeria, and the Cuban Revolution. The MNRT was joined by key Tacuara members, including Jorge Cataldo, Alfredo Roca and Ruben Rodríguez. In 1962, Baxter, the leader of MNRT, met Che Guevara. The MNRT would then adopt the guerilla tactics of Guevara and Abraham Guillén, and spread them to left-wing guerilla groups such as the Montoneros and the Argentine People’s Revolutionary Army (ERP).

Baxter/Nell's MNRT became progressively more left-wing and attracted by Marxism. Historian David Rock argues that MNRT "moved over to the far left". The ideology of the MNRT was that of "the Spanish Falange but combined with Peronism, with the objective of creating a national syndicalist state." It was the precursor of the Montoneros, as the leaders of the future Montoneros and ERP's would come from the MNRT. Montoneros themselves combined Guevarism and revolutionary Peronism with right-wing Catholic nationalism. Distancing itself from antisemitism and the sections of the right it perceived reactionary, MNRT became strongly influenced by the Cuban Revolution and the Algerian War. It started following the Guevara's foco theory and took part in series of armed robberies on military storehouses and factories, including a robbery of the Policlínico Bancario of Buenos Aires (Bank Labor Union’s Hospital). The MNRT was dealt a fatal blow in March 1964, when a police investigation revealed who was behind the robbery at the Policlínico Bancario and a wave of arrests followed. In prison, MNRT militants read Marxist works and incorporated Marxism into their ideology, without abandoning Peronism as their political identity.

The MNRT praised the Algerian Revolution as ‘the realisation of our most cherished ideals’, which the group defined as a socialism based on agrarian reform, the expropriation of foreign companies and the nationalisation of strategic sectors of the economy, but with the peculiarity of being nationalist and religious (Catholic in the case of MNRT). Approaching Marxism, the MNRT also stressed that "the proletariat is the only class in the country that has national consciousness, and its permanent anti-oligarchic and anti-imperialist militancy makes it the driving force of the National Revolution"; and that "its condition as an oppressed class has given it a greater awareness of the radical change that needs to be made in the economic and social structures". From there MNRT would also criticize the nationalism of Tacuara, arguing that it has to ‘set aside its elite prejudices’ and instead embrace Peronism and the Argentina working class, with the MNRT stating that "if nationalism did not rely on the people, it would inevitably become a shock force for the bourgeoisie". MNRT embraced Peronism because it shared with Tacuara Political Catholicism, a "revolutionary nationalist doctrine" and "national liberation goals". The MNRT also denounced racism, arguing that the Catholic, social and national revolution pursued by Tacuara is not about racial affiliation, but by the antagonism between exploiters and exploited. Daxter wrote:

Firstly, we must clarify that at no point was any mention made of biological, racial, skin colour or hair type factors, etc. Therefore, all statements that portray the third world as the ramblings of children influenced by some national left-wing “ideologue” who, driven by a certain [illegible] mentality, defend blackness are utterly ridiculous. As for the problem of choosing between whites and blacks, the definition is very simple. Between a fine specimen of a capitalist and exploiter, with straight blond hair, white skin and blue eyes, and an exploited Baluba, [illegible], with curly black hair, we choose the black man. Conversely, if the choice is between a Mr Tshombe, who is black but a capitalist, exploiter, executioner of his own people and an important director of international trusts, and a white worker exploited by those same trusts, we choose the white man; in other words, the problem is not between whites and blacks but between exploiters and exploited, and if there are many more white exploiters than black exploiters, that is no reason for the white race to be proud.

We also know that Argentina is part of a nation still to be built, Hispanic America, in which the contribution of other races is of paramount importance, and that for the future development of that great nation, the collaboration of Indians, whites and blacks is essential (a collaboration and integration that no one, except some foreign colonialist or some mentally ill native, can question). For us, identification with the Third World does not come through the colour of our skin but through our condition as exploited people. Like Africans and Asians, Latin Americans have a common denominator, which is underdevelopment, hunger and colonialist oppression.

Historian Thomas Goebel wrote that while the ideology of MNRT was mainly based on "Sorelian syndicalism as well as social Catholicism, some members increasingly looked for inspiration in Marxism-Leninism". The MNRT underwent a "metamorphosis from fascism to Marxism" and started admiring Castro, Perón, Ho Chi Minh and Mao Zedong; on the leader of MNRT, Baxter, Edmundo Murray remarked: "When policemen raided his house in Villa Urquiza, they were bewildered by portraits of Hitler, Mussolini, and Fidel Castro decorating his bedroom." As the precursor to Montoneros, MNRT went "from far-right nationalism to both Peronism and Marxism, or at least towards the syncretic forms of Peronism and Marxism proposed by Montoneros and the PRT-ERP."

In early 1964, the MNRT issued a joint statement with a Marxist-Peronist group CONDOR, stating that "Peronism is a national mass movement that develops its own revolutionary vanguard" which will lead to "revolution in Argentina, which can only happen through the massive mobilisation of the Argentine people in war against the system". Both groups then argued that Marxism must be embraced to liberate Argentina from semi-colonial dependency, and concluded that "no one who calls himself a Marxist can be outside Peronism". After the statement, the MNRT publicly identified as both Marxist and Peronist. Police reports from raids on MNRT bases mentioned 'numerous books, mostly about Marxist doctrine, and by 1965 Argentine security forces considered Tacuara an instance of "communist infiltration" rather than fascism. Michael Goebel argues that while retaining the Catholic nationalist and Falangist fundaments of the Tacuara ideology, the MNRT "had thus become a Marxist-Peronist group that advocated Third World liberation."

The two leaders of MNRT, Jose Luis Nell and Joe Baxter, went on to participate in socialist and communist movements, and died in mid-1970s. Nell joined the Uruguayan Marxist-Leninist Tupamaros and was imprisoned in Montevideo; he later escaped and joined the Montoneros. As a Montonero, he was shot in the Ezeiza massacre and left paralyzed. In 1974, he committed suicide by train in Buenos Aires. Baxter went to Vietnam and joined Viet Cong there, and later travelled to the People's Republic of China. He then returned to Argentina and participated in the foundation of Trotskyist People's Revolutionary Army. He died in 1973 in plane crash while trying to smuggle cash to fund the Sandinistas in Nicaragua.

== Operations ==
The MNT maintained contacts with the police as well as with some former Nazi bureaucrats exiled in Argentina, which helped them gain easy access to weapons, an advantage which put them apart from other political organizations. They were also engaged in racketeering, demanding a “revolutionary tax” from many Jewish shops in the Once (once means 'eleven') neighborhood of Buenos Aires, until the shops organized themselves to confront the MNT together. At first mainly engaged in street fights with other rival students’ organizations, in particular concerning the conflict between nonreligious and religious schooling, the MNT also engaged in antisemitic acts (such as vandalism in the Jewish cemetery of La Tablada in 1959, etc.). The MNT's antisemitism became even stronger after Adolf Eichmann's May 1960 kidnapping by Israel's intelligence agency, the Mossad, leading to a violent antisemitic campaign which lasted until 1964, when the MNT was almost completely dismantled. This led the Jewish association DAIA to pressure the government into taking actions against MNT.

The peak was reached on August 17, 1960, when MNT members from Sarmiento National High School attacked Jewish pupils and injured a 15-year-old, Edgardo Trilnik, during the celebrations in honor of José de San Martín, Argentina's national hero in the war of independence. From then on, the MNT perpetrated acts of intimidation against the Jewish community, including bombing synagogues and other Jewish institutions and defacing the buildings with antisemitic graffiti. Following Eichmann's execution in 1962, the MNT launched 30 antisemitic attacks. On June 21, 1962, they kidnapped a 19-year-old Jewish girl, Graciela Sirota, tortured her, and scarred her with Swastika signs. In retaliation against this odious act, which raised public outrage, the DAIA on June 28, 1962, stopped all the activities of Jewish trade, supported by students (many high schools went on strike) and various political organizations, trade unions and intellectuals. These violent actions finally led the government to issue decree 3134/63 which prohibited, in 1963, any MNT or GRN activity. However, the influence of the secret services effectively nullified this decree.

Some members of the MNRT became famous on August 29, 1963, by assaulting the Policlínico Bancario bank, stealing 14 million pesos (equivalent to 100,000 US dollars), a fortune at the time. Two employees were killed in the assault and three injured. This was the first armed political action carried on by an exclusively civil group in Argentina's history, making of the MNT-MNRT the "first urban guerrilla group in Argentina". However, the police finally tracked down the robbers and practically dismantled the MNRT. Most imprisoned activists were freed in May 1973, when center-left (and Peronist) president Héctor Cámpora issued a broad amnesty decree for all political prisoners.

The MNT was invited by the Peronist trade-unions to the CGT's assembly in Rosario in 1964 in order to counter the left-wing. However, in obscure circumstances, gunshots in a closed environment led to the death of two Tacuara activists and one Peronist Youth member. The Tacuaras then retaliated by murdering Raúl Alterman, a Jewish communist chosen only on the basis of his background. This assassination again raised national public outrage, and Joe Baxter, former Tacuara activist who had formed the MNRT, publicly denounced Ezcurra's Nazi ideology on a media show hosted by Bernardo Neustadt. Rodolfo Barra, Justice Minister of Carlos Menem, was forced to resign in 1996 on charges that he had participated to the assassination.

In 1964, the Arab League's Hussein Triki (who had been a Nazi collaborator) strengthened the Arab League neo-Nazi ties and with Tacuara. On April 27, 1964, Argentine Arab Youth Movement distributed leaflets inviting the public to a "big demonstration in support of the Arab League." And its Hussein Triki. At that meeting, slogans: "Long Live Hitler", "Nasser and Peron", "Jews to the Crematoria", and "Make Soap out of the Jews", were voiced by participants, identified by their uniforms, as well as by their Nazi salute, as members of Tacuara and Guardia Restauradora Nacionalista, neo-Nazi groups.

== Decline ==
After the 1963 Policlinico Bancario assault and the 1964 murder of Raúl Alterman, many MNTers were arrested or forced into hiding. Thus, in the same month, March 1964, the two rival branches of Tacuaras (MNRT and MNR), were disbanded. The group was officially outlawed in 1965 under president Arturo Illia (UCR). After having met Perón, fighting in Vietnam (against the US) and travelling to China, Joe Baxter, one of the founders of the MNT, turned toward the revolutionary left-wing and finally became one of the cofounders of the ERP, alongside Mario Roberto Santucho. Baxter died on 11 July 1973 in a plane crash in France. José Luis Nell, another MNT leader, joined the left-wing guerrilla group, the FAR-Montoneros. He became a paraplegic from injuries suffered during the 1973 Ezeiza massacre on the day of Perón's return from 20 years of exile, and committed suicide two years later.

On the other hand, Alberto Ezcurra Uriburu, who was one of the strongest proponent of antisemitism, became a priest at the end of 1964 and left the organization's direction in the hands of Patricio Collins. Ezcurra would later work for the secret services, and then for the Argentine Anticommunist Alliance (Triple A) death squad and, following the 1976 military coup, elite military secret service squad, Batallón de Inteligencia 601.

Dardo Cabo later joined the Vandorista trade-union. Alongside three activists, Dardo Cabo hijacked a plane belonging to Aerolíneas Argentinas in 1966 to bring it to the Falkland Islands, where he planted an Argentine flag. He was later killed in detention by the military dictatorship on January 6, 1977.

== See also ==
- History of Argentina
- Argentine Patriotic League, a nationalist Catholic group created in 1919
- Dirty War
- Fatherland and Liberty, a similar Chilean group
- 1973 Ezeiza Massacre
- Peronism
- José López Rega, leader of the far-right wing of Peronism
- Jordán Bruno Genta, far-right ideologue
- Los TECOS

== Bibliography ==
- Leonardo Senkman, El antisemitismo en la Argentina, ISBN 950-25-1407-6
- Silvina Heguy, Joe Baxter, ISBN 987-545-403-6
- Daniel Gutman, Tacuara, Historia de la primera guerrilla urbana Argentina, Vergara, ISBN 950-15-2281-4
