= Alberto Ezcurra Medrano =

Argentine historian (1909–1982)

- Born: Alberto Felipe León Ezcurra Medrano; June 28, 1909; Buenos Aires, Argentina
- Died: February 19, 1982 (aged 72); Buenos Aires, Argentina
- Occupations: Historian and professor
- Notable work: Catolicismo y nacionalismo (1936)
- Children: 7

Alberto Ezcurra Medrano was an Argentine historian and nationalist activist.

One of the most important thinkers of Argentine Nacionalismo, Ezcurra championed a social order based on Roman Catholicism and corporatist economics. His son Alberto Ezcurra Uriburu would become one of the most important Argentine far-right political figures of the 20th century as a leader of the Movimiento Nacionalista Tacuara.

== Biography ==
Alberto Ezcurra Medrano was born in Buenos Aires in 1909. His family was related to Encarnación Ezcurra, wife of Argentine caudillo Juan Manuel de Rosas and an important political figure of her time.

He worked as a history professor at the Colegio Nacional de Buenos Aires and rose to intellectual prominence with his studies about the Argentine Confederation. In 1939 Ezcurra founded the Instituto de Investigaciones Históricas Juan Manuel de Rosas to promote historical revisionism in Argentina.

Ezcurra also stood out as a writer for many nationalist magazines and newspapers like La Nueva República, Baluarte, Crisol and Nueva Política.

He had seven children, of whom three became priests.

== Ideology ==
Ezcurra adhered to Nacionalismo, a loosely defined ideological current which emphasized Catholic religion, medievalist reactionarism, corporatism and authoritarianism. His ideas were close to that of Argentine priest Julio Meinvielle, despite being less pragmatic.

Ezcurra summed up his ideology as proposing "a strong government and a corporatist regime as a reaction against liberal individualism". He considered nationalism as an "exaltation of moral values as a reaction against atheism, internationalism and Marxist materialism", that notwithstanding was to be tempered by Catholic doctrine in order to succeed and avoid falling into totalitarianism.

An integralist, Ezcurra supported Gelasian Diarchy and idealised the Middle Ages as a peak of Western civilisation marked by social harmony and order. According to his vision, the West had undergone a progressive decadence since the Reformation and the Age of Enlightenment that was to be reverted by the restoration of an appropriate relationship between Church and State.

He saw Argentine national identity and history as inherently bound to Christianity, despite the process of slow decadence it had experienced since the fall of Juan Manuel de Rosas. Ezcurra understood Argentine nationalism as essentially connected to political Catholicism and pan-Hispanism, holding a Traditionalist perspective based on restoring a supposedly lost Christian order of society that would return Argentina to its actual national character.

Ezcurra had a close ideological relationship with authoritarian movements, including European fascism. He was sympathetic to Benito Mussolini's regime in Italy and admired Francoism and Salazarism. However, he denounced Nazism as a "neopagan" and "anti-Christian" consequence of the Protestant Reformation.

== Main works ==
- Las otras Tablas de Sangre (1934)
- Catolicismo y nacionalismo (1936)
- La independencia del Paraguay: historia de una desmembración Argentina (1941)
- Sarmiento masón (1952)
- Historia del Anticristo (1990)
