= Herrndorf =

Herrndorf is a surname of German origin. Notable people with the surname include:

- Peter Herrndorf (1940–2023), Canadian lawyer and media businessman
- Wolfgang Herrndorf (1965–2013), German author, painter, and illustrator

== See also ==
- Daniel Herrendorf (born 1965), Argentine writer, essayist and philosopher
