= Punto de Vista =

Punto de Vista may refer to:

- Punto de Vista (journal), Argentine literary journal founded in 1978
- Punto de Vista (album), a 1990 album by Gilberto Santa Rosa

== See also ==
- Punto de Vista International Documentary Film Festival, Spanish film festival
