= Frondizi (surname) =

Frondizi is an Italian surname. Notable people with the surname include:

- Arturo Frondizi (1908–1995), Argentine lawyer and politician, President of the Nation between 1958 and 1962
- Risieri Frondizi (1910–1983), Argentine philosopher and anthropologist
- Silvio Frondizi (1907–1974), Argentine academic and lawyer
