= Máximo Etchecopar =

Argentine diplomat and writer

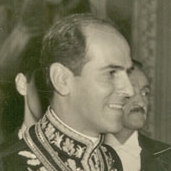
- Máximo Etchecopar
- Born: Máximo Etchecopar; February 19, 1912; Tucuman
- Died: 20 March 2002 (aged 90)
- Education: University of Buenos Aires
- Occupation: Diplomat
- Known for: Political writer
- Notable work: El fin del Nuevo Mundo (1984)
- Awards: Order of Pius IX, Magistral Grace of the Sovereign Military Order of Malta

Máximo Etchecopar (19 February 1912 – 20 March 2002) was an Argentine diplomat, writer and early adherent of the nationalist strain in the country's political and intellectual elite.

== Political career ==
Born in Tucuman, Etchecopar attended the University of Buenos Aires and graduated with a law degree. He became part of a Catholic cultural movement along with the likes of Leopoldo Marechal and Francisco Luis Bernárdez. A disciple and friend of José Ortega y Gasset he became a close ally of Rodolfo Irazusta and Carlos Ibarguren. He wrote for such journals as Sol y Luna and Nueva Politica in defence of oligarchy and in praise of Juan Manuel de Rosas. His works also appeared in Balcón, the journal of anti-Semitic hardliner Julio Meinvielle. In 1942 he was a leading delegate at the Congresa de la Recuperación Nacional at Buenos Aires, a failed attempt to unite the various strands of nationalist thought in the country.

== Diplomacy ==
Following the failure of this initiative Etchecopar became a close ally of Mario Amadeo and under his influence became a supporter of Arturo Frondizi, moving away from nationalism. Etchecopar soon came to concentrate more fully on his diplomatic posts, holding a number of leading positions. He served as Consul-General in Cairo from 1947 to 1948 before moving on to London where he was stationed to 1949. He served as ambassador to the Vatican City from 1950 to 1955 and was awarded both the Order of Pius IX and Magistral Grace of the Sovereign Military Order of Malta for his service. He subsequently acted as Argentina's ambassador to Sweden, Peru, Mexico, Colombia and Switzerland whilst also serving as director of the main training centre for diplomats, the Instituto del Servicio Exterior de la Nación, from 1966 to 1969.

== Writing ==
Etchecopar was also noted as a writer, with his main books including Breve y varia lección, Unos papeles de Lofredo Paz, Con mi generación, Historia de una afición a leer, Esquema de la Argentina and El fin del Nuevo Mundo. The latter, published in 1984, was particularly well received as a leading study of modern developments in Spanish-speaking America.
