= Punto de Vista (journal) =

Literary magazine in Argentina (1978–2008)

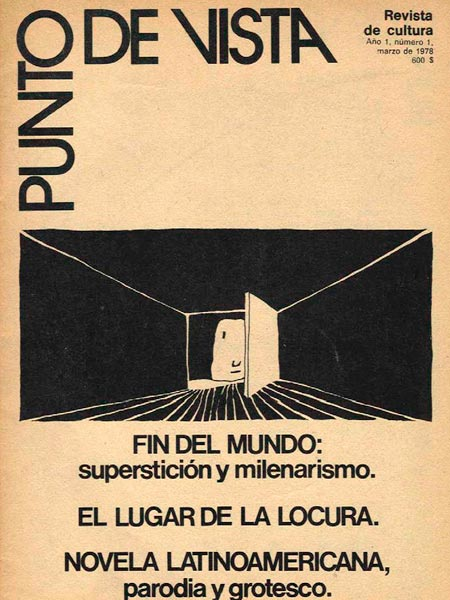
- Cover of the issue
- Editor-in-Chief: Beatriz Sarlo
- Categories: Literary magazine
- Founded: 1978
- Final issue Number: 2008; 90
- Country: Argentina
- Language: Spanish

Punto de Vista (Point of View) was an Argentine literary journal founded in 1978 during the height of the military regime headed by General Jorge Videla. Taking advantage of the slight lessening of censorship after Argentina's 1978 FIFA World Cup soccer victory, the journal, whose contributors were pseudonymous, focused on art and politics, stressing culture over ideology both because it was safer to do so under the extant political conditions, and because its editors were becoming disillusioned with orthodox Marxism.

Its leading figure was Beatriz Sarlo, who remained associated with the journal. After the dictatorship weakened its control in the early 1980s, the contributors began to write in their name. Though the centrality of the journal declined after the return of democracy making the daily newspapers and their weekend supplements once again accessible to left-leaning intellectuals, it remained one of the leading literary and cultural journals in the Spanish-speaking world.

Throughout its different periods, María Teresa Gramuglio, Hilda Sabato, José Aricó, Juan Carlos Portantiero and Oscar Terán, among other personalities of Argentine culture, have been contributors to the magazine. In its last issues the magazine was directed by Beatriz Sarlo and co-directed by Adrián Gorelik. Its last editorial board was made up of Raúl Beceyro, Jorge Dotti, Rafael Filippelli, Federico Monjeau, Ana Porrúa, Oscar Terán and Hugo Vezzetti.

The journal closed down after 30 years in 2008 and 90 issues.
