= Julio Meinvielle =

Argentine priest and writer (1905–1973)

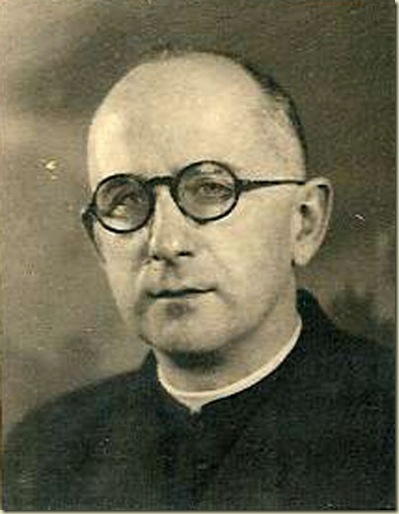
- Meinvielle in 1953
- Born: Julio Meinvielle; 31 August 1905; Buenos Aires, Argentina
- Died: 2 August 1973 (aged 67); Buenos Aires, Argentina
- Education: Doctor of Philosophy and Theology
- Occupations: Priest and writer
- Notable work: From Lammenais to Maritain
- Political party: Tacuara Nationalist Movement
- Opponent: Jacques Maritain

Father Julio Meinvielle (31 August 1905 – 2 August 1973) was an Argentine priest and prolific writer. A prominent traditionalist Catholic thinker and polemicist, he had a strong influence on the development of nacionalismo.

== Background ==
Meinvielle studied for his Doctorate in Philosophy and Theology in Rome and soon afterwards became a prolific writer of religious, historical and economic books within the school of Thomism. He came to see history as a process of decline in Catholic values, as determined by three events that he saw as catastrophic i.e. the work of Martin Luther, the French Revolution and the October Revolution.

== Criticism of Jacques Maritain ==
Meinvielle was a staunch critic of what he perceived as slipping standards in Catholic teaching. On this basis he had a well publicized feud with Jacques Maritain during the late 1930s. The conflict had begun in 1936 when Maritain visited Argentina for the first time and was initially well received by a number of leading Catholic figures. Meinvielle denounced Maritain as the 'advocate of the Spanish Reds', sparking off a war of words between the two. His book From Lammenais to Maritain was actually a critique of the ideas of Jacques Maritain, claiming that Maritain was defending the faithlessness of modern society by his endorsement of liberalism. Tracing the origins of Maritain's work to Hugues Felicité Robert de Lamennais as well as that of Marc Sangnier and Le Sillon, he argued that the humanism of these writers was incompatible with the Catholic faith.

He took as the basis for his Catholicism the works of Thomas Aquinas and the Papal encyclicals Rerum novarum and Quadragesimo anno, contrasting them with his twin political hates of liberalism and communism.

== Antisemitism ==
He was also critical of capitalism and Marxism and he sought to draw parallels between the two by arguing that materialism was the basis for both. Instead he sought an economic system based on Roman Catholicism in which consumption regulated production and in which wealth creation was fine as long as the wealth was re-invested. In common with Rodolfo Irazusta he was a stern critic of usury and he blamed this practice on the Jews, citing Werner Sombart as his inspiration for this conclusion. Meinvielle added a strong belief in Sinarquia, a secret society designed to conspire to bring about Jewish domination of the world.

He further contended that Judaism had the destruction of Christianity as its basis and therefore argued that whatever ills befell the Christian world were inherently the fault of the Jews. As part of this critique he repeated the blood libel as well as suggesting that capitalism and communism were both Jewish constructs as part of their plan for world domination. Whilst his ideas owed a lot to the Protocols of the Elders of Zion, Meinvielle did not explicitly endorse that document, as a number of contemporary court cases had found it to be a fraud. He added a Christological dimension to his anti-Semitism by arguing that the grand struggle between Christianity and Judaism was a parallel to that between Jesus Christ and Satan. He did however feel that it was possible to defeat the Jews by unity and, where necessary, violence, drawing on the notions of Nimio de Anquín that violence in service of 'truth' is justified.

To this end he applauded the rise of fascism, for which he saw a Christian mission. He was particularly enamoured of the falangism variant as he was a believer in the virtues of Hispanidad and Spain playing a leading role in the fortunes of Latin America. Meinvielle did however feel that the cult of personality surrounding both Benito Mussolini and Adolf Hitler was contrary to Catholicism and the primacy of Christ and so argued that any Argentine version of fascism would have to be avowedly religious and anti-secular. His 1936 book El Judio distilled these fascist views and gave his thinking an Argentine dimension as he argued Buenos Aires was the archetype of 'Babylon', dominated as he felt it was by international Jewish financial interests.

Politically he was associated with a coterie of young Catholic intellectuals, including Máximo Etchecopar, Ignacio Anzoategui and Matías Sánchez Sorondo, who produced the 1937 document Programma Nacionalista. He subsequently joined the Nueva Politica group when Sánchez Sorondo established it in 1941.

== Later years ==
Meinville taught philosophy at Catholic institutions for much of his life and he would also serve as the chaplain at Santa Casa de Ejercicios. He continued to write widely and from the late 1940s to the 1960s he published three journals, Balcon, Dialogo and Presencia, in which he expressed his religious and political views.

Meinville initially supported Edelmiro Julián Farrell and his successor Juan Perón, but began to have doubts about Peronism, feeling that socio-economic concerns had become too prominent at the expense of the initial hard-line nationalism that attracted him. He was particularly critical of Perón's attempts to woo the trade union movement to his side and subsequently denounced Peron as a demagogue.

In 1952 Meinvielle became a leading figure in the Union Fédérale, a post-Perón party of the right. Continuing to be outspoken in his condemnation of those who did not meet his standards, Meinville was finally suspended from the Catholic Church in 1961 by Antonio Caggiano, the Archbishop of Buenos Aires, after he stated that President Arturo Frondizi was a communist agent. He was also a strong critic of the regime of Juan Carlos Onganía, claiming that he was acting on behalf of Sinarquia.

In July 1973, Meinvielle was hit by a truck while crossing the road. The driver of the vehicle was the driver of the then mayor of Buenos Aires, the Peronist Leopoldo Frenkel. He was hospitalized for a month at the San Camilo Clinic with multiple fractures and died on 2 August 1973. His funeral mass was celebrated by Archbishop Juan Carlos Aramburu, and he was eulogized by his disciple, Carlos Alberto Sacheri, who called him "an exceptional figure." At his funeral procession, one handle of his coffin was carried by Carlos Mugica, and the other by Alberto Ezcurra Medrano.

== Influence ==
Meinvielle's influence was strong throughout the far right in Argentina. Practically, he served as advisor and spiritual inspiration to the highly anti-Semitic Tacuara Nationalist Movement. However, on a wider level he had a deep impact on the nationalist intellectual strand, with the likes of José López Rega (who shared his belief in the fictitious Sinarquia) and Jordán Bruno Genta heavily influenced by his words. Other future government figures such as Mario Amadeo, Alberto Baldrich and Samuel Medrano were also influenced by his works to an extent. Similarly Colonel Mohamed Alí Seineldín, who was arrested in 1987 for plotting a military coup also declared himself a disciple of Meinvielle. The diplomat Máximo Etchecopar had also written for Meinvielle's journal Balcón during his formative years.

He was also influential on the Argentine scouting movement as he was founder of the Union Scouts Católicos Argentinos.
