= Revolutionary tax =

Tax fee extorted by a non-governmental revolutionary organization

Revolutionary tax is a major form of funding for violent non-state actors such as guerrilla and terrorist organizations. Those outside the organization may consider it to be a euphemism for "protection money." Proponents of such groups maintain however that there is no difference between the revolutionary taxes "extorted" by given groups and corporate taxes raised by governments.

Revolutionary taxes are typically extorted from businesses, and they also "play a secondary role as one other means of intimidating the target population."

== Examples ==
The Irish Provisional IRA and Corsican National Liberation Front of Corsica have extorted revolutionary taxes as well as the following organizations:

=== Argentina ===
The Argentinian neo-Nazi organisation Movimiento Nacionalista Tacuara (MNT) demanded a "revolutionary tax" from Jewish shops in Buenos Aires.

=== Colombia ===
The revolutionary taxes of Colombian guerrilla movements have become more common in the 1980s and 1990s.

=== Spain ===
The Basque nationalist organization ETA depended on revolutionary taxes. Small to medium-sized businesses were extorted between the amounts of 35,000 to 400,000 euros each, which comprised most of ETA's 10 million euro budget in 2001.

=== Nepal ===
The Maoist guerillas of Nepal have also widely extorted revolutionary taxes.

=== Philippines ===
In the Philippines some local and foreign companies pay revolutionary taxes to the Maoist New People's Army. According to the army, the tax is a major obstacle for the country's development while the New People's Army justified it as a tax to be paid upon entering territories controlled by the rebels being a belligerent force.
