= Edmundo Murray =

Argentine author

Edmundo Murray (born 1955 in Buenos Aires), is an Argentine author, born in a family with mixed Colombian, Irish and Swiss roots. He has published widely on Irish-Latin American relations, art and diplomacy, links between food and music, and cycling cultures.

== Biography ==
Edmundo Murray studied in Argentina, Switzerland and the United States. He obtained a PhD in Latin American literature from University of Zurich (Romanisches Seminar), and a M.A. from University of Geneva. He is a lecturer and frequent contributor of articles in cultural history, regional cultural integration and Irish and Latin American studies. He is a Founding Member of the Society for Irish Latin American Studies, and member of the Swiss Society of Americanists. Founder and first editor of Irish Migration Studies in Latin America, a journal focusing on relations between Ireland and Latin America. His focus on immigrants's identity considered as "a problem, an open question", led him to analyze other aspects of cultural history in international relations, links between food and music, and literary identities.

Visiting professor at University of Cape Verde. Research consultant of the West Africa Institute. Advisory Board member and contributor to Ireland and the Americas: Culture, Politics, and History (Santa Barbara, CA: ABC-CLIO, 2008). Poet and a short-story writer, he published Poemas Nómades (1999) and Taxonomía Fantástica de los Árboles de Buenos Aires (2000). From 2001 to 2020, Murray worked as publishing officer at WTO Publications, the in-house publisher of the World Trade Organization. He is a travel writer and bikepacker, and he contributes articles to his blog Bikes and Cultures.

Murray's book about the WTO building Art Discovery and Censorship in the Centre William Rappard of Geneva: Building the Future (2023) has been described as "an important contribution to the knowledge of significant heritage aspects of the international public buildings and their artistic collections", and a "fascinating account [that] provides intriguing insights into the artworks that were commissioned or gifted to the prestigious occupants of the Rue de Lausanne, 154". The chapter dedicated to the removal of Claude Namy's caricature In GATT We Trust in 2019 has been disapproved by the WTO, resulting on 14 percent of the original text deleted.

Edmundo Murray is married to Estelle Varanguien de Villepin and father of five. He currently lives in Peloponnese, Greece.

== Works ==
- Art Discovery and Censorship in the Centre William Rappard of Geneva: Building the Future (London: Palgrave Macmillan, 2023).
- Symphony of Flavors: Food and Music in Concert (Newcastle: Cambridge Scholars Publishing, 2015). Editor.
- Intégration régionale en Afrique de l´Ouest (Praia: West Africa Institute, 2014), with Abdarahmane Ngaïdé, Kalie Sillah, Bio Goura Soule, and Olumuyiwa Alaba.
- Centre William Rappard: Home of the World Trade Organization, Geneva (Geneva: WTO, 2011), with Joëlle Kuntz, also published in French and Spanish.
- Becoming gauchos ingleses: Diasporic Models in Irish-Argentine Literature (Palo Alto: Academica Press, 2009).
- Becoming Irlandés: Private Narratives of the Irish Emigration to Argentina 1844-1912 (Buenos Aires: L.O.L.A. Literature of Latin America, 2006). Revised edition.
- Devenir irlandés: Narrativas íntimas de la emigración irlandesa a la Argentina 1844-1912 (Buenos Aires: Eudeba, 2004).

== See also ==
- Society for Irish Latin American Studies
