= Ricardo Maliandi =

Ricardo Guillermo Maliandi (born in La Plata, 1930, died 12 February 2015) Argentine writer and philosopher, devoted to ethics.

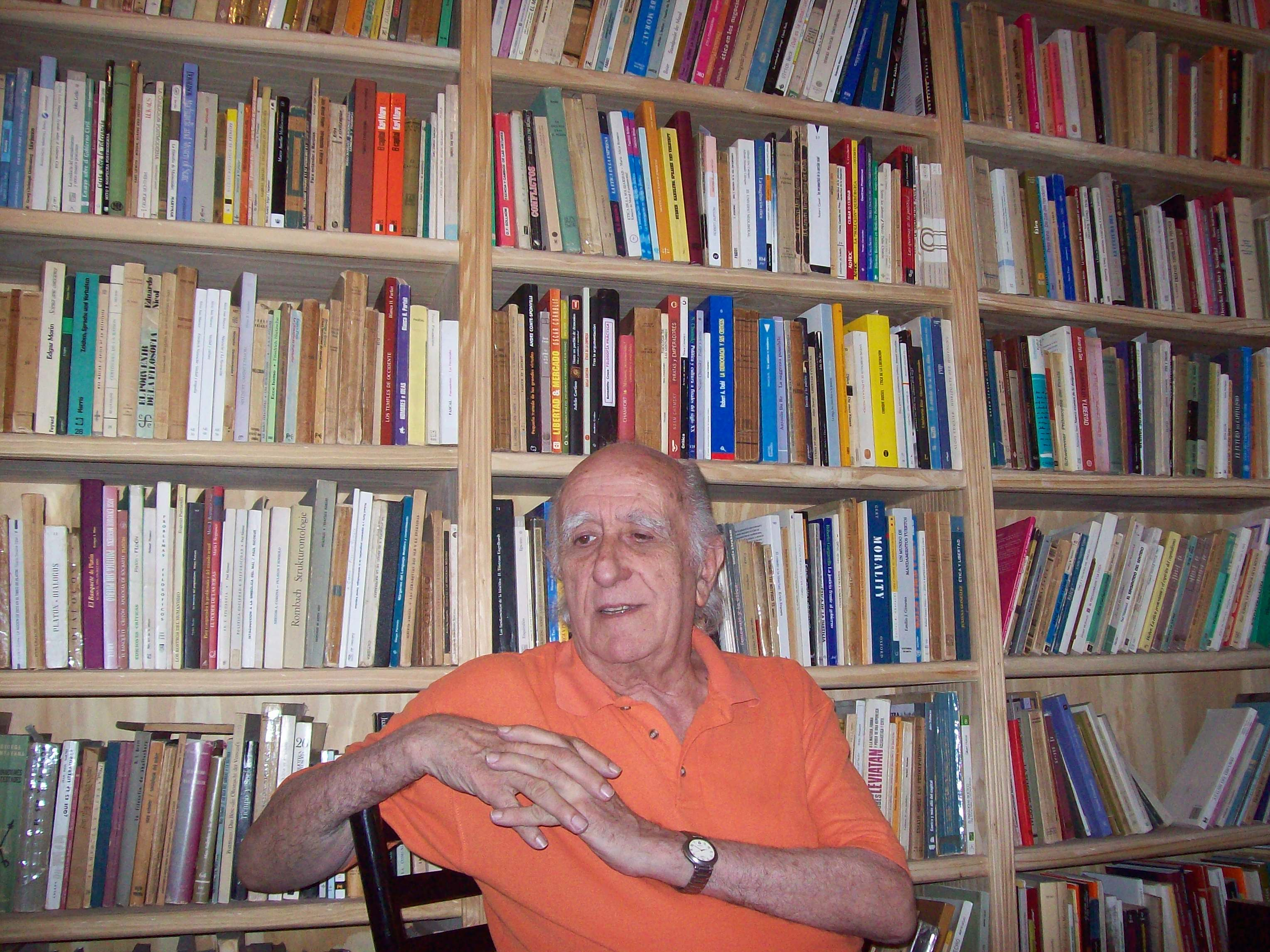
Philosopher Ricardo Maliandi

He was professor in many Argentine universities and researcher in CONICET. Doctor in Philosophy for Mainz University, Germany. He received Konex Prize in 1986 for his labor on ethics.

As well he is chairman of Argentine Association of Ethical Researches, fellow of National Academy of Sciences and honorary member of Argentine Association of Bioethics.

His researches started on axiology, especially the works of Nicolai Hartmann, from who he has translated many books. Afterward he made an approach to Discourse Ethics and became friend of one of his founders, Karl-Otto Apel. From many years he works in an original propose which he call "ethics of convergence".

== Ethics of convergence ==
From the beginning of his philosophical career Ricardo Maliandi has researched on material ethics of values, especially Nicolai Hartmann's approach (see Maliandi's doctoral thesis, Mainz University, Wertobjektivität und Realitätserfahrung). Two problems were always under his attention in ethics: foundation and conflict. He was convinced the intuitionism of axiological ethics is not enough for a rigorous foundation, but aware as well of the very suggestions of Hartmann analysis on conflictive relations among values, ethical thinking of Maliandi develops as a pursuit of an ethical foundation non-intuitionist, that recognizes conflicts. Sometimes, this research was close to Philosophical Anthropology (see Cultura y conflicto).

In his newest works are very important transcendental pragmatics and Discourse Ethics of Karl-Otto Apel. They both offer a new aprioristic foundation, but different of the intuitionist. Maliandi introduces, as a programmatic propose, an approaching between Harmtann's and Apel's ethics, in the sense of the conflictive structure of ethos (emphasized by Hartmann) and a pragmatic-trascendental reflexive foundation (held by Apel) (see, Transformación y síntesis). The aprioristic axis that, despite multiple differences of these approaches, linked these two philosophers, allows Maliandi to make a defense of universalism against the unilateral stressing of difference, as appeared in actual irrational trends (see Dejar la posmodernidad. La ética frente al irracionalismo actual). This effort is complemented with the development of a theory of reason and stresses its "bidimensionality" (foundation and critique) and its "dialogicity" (the fact that reason only works as dialogical communication as it is exposed in Volver a la razón).

Maliandi's ethical conception can be summarized, as he proposed, as "ethics of convergence", he continues working on this topic. (See La ética cuestionada.. Prolegómenos para una ética convergente, 1998. Ética: dilemas y convergencias, 2006, Teoría y praxis de los principios bioéticos –with Oscar Thüer—Buenos Aires, UNLa, 2008 ). "Convergence" is understood as:

1) an approaching between material ethics of values and discourse ethics, and as a result, between the admission of the inevitability of conflicts and a propose for strong foundation, a priori (conjunction of that "a priori of conflictivity" derives from).

2) a basic feature of an ethics that recognizes a plurality of principles, but as well, at the same time, demands to maximize harmony between them.

== Philosophical writings ==
- 2010 – Discurso y convergencia. "La ética discursiva de Karl-Otto Apel y el laberinto de los conflictos". Buenos Aires: Oinos (edición auspiciada por la Facultad de Filosofía y Letras de la Universidad Autónoma de Nuevo León, México). ISBN 978-987-24649-1-2.
- 2010 – (editor) Jornadas Nacionales de Ética 2009: Conflictividad, dos tomos, Buenos Aires, UCES. ISBN 978-987-98351-7-3.
- 2009 – Valores blasfemos. "Diálogos con Heidegger y Gadamer". Buenos Aires: Las Cuarenta. ISBN 978-987-1501-10-6. With Graciela Fernández.
- 2008 – Teoría y praxis de los principios bioéticos con Oscar Thüer. Escalada: UNLa.
- 2006 – Ética, dilemas y convergencias. Buenos Aires: Biblos.
- 1998 – La ética cuestionada. Buenos Aires: Almagesto.
- 1997 – Volver a la razón. Buenos Aires: Biblos.
- 1993 – Dejar la posmodernidad. Buenos Aires: Almagesto.
- 1991 – Ética: conceptos y problemas. Buenos Aires: Biblos (4th re-edition, 2004).
- 1991 – Transformación y síntesis. Buenos Aires: Almagesto.
- 1984 – Cultura y conflicto. Buenos Aires: Biblos.
- 1967 – Hartmann. Buenos Aires: Centro Editor de América Latina.
- 1966 – Wertobjektivität und Realitätserfahrung. Bonn: Bouvier.

== Other writings ==
- 2001 – La nariz de Cleopatra, Buenos Aires: Leviatán.
- 2003 – 16 jueces y 1 ahorcado, Mar del Plata: Ed. Suárez.
- 1981 – La novela dentro de la novela.
- 1972 – Naufragio de la piel.

== Homages ==
Cristina Ambrosini (editor) Ética. Convergencias y divergencias. Homenaje a Ricardo Maliandi, Remedios de Escalada, Ediciones de la UNLa, 2009, 443 pp., ISBN 978-987-1326-38-9.

Michelini, Dorando; José San Martín y Jutta Wester (editores) Ética, discurso, conflictividad. Homenaje a Ricardo Maliandi, Universidad Nacional de Río Cuarto, Argentina, 1995, ISBN 978-950-665-019-3.
