= Carlos Alberto Sacheri =

Argentine philosopher (1932–1974)

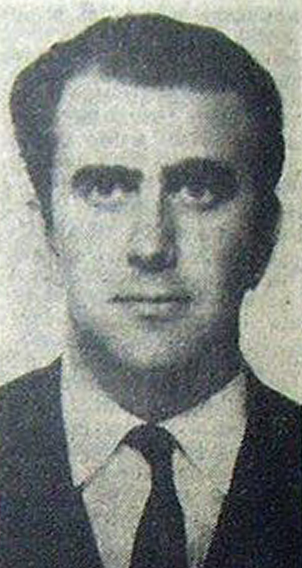
Sacheri in 1974

Carlos Alberto Sacheri (October 22, 1933, in Buenos Aires – December 22, 1974) was an Argentine Thomist philosopher and scholar. He was murdered in front of his family by ERP members on 22 December 1974 in Buenos Aires; he was targeted because of his perceived anti-communism. He was a disciple of the priest Julio Meinvielle (a well-known doctrinarian of the Argentine nationalist movements). The most widespread of his publications was The Clandestine Church (1971), a denunciation of modernism and liberation theology from traditional positions.

== Biography ==
Sacheri was born on October 22, 1933. He joined the Argentine Catholic Action during his high school studies. He entered the Faculty of Law and Social Sciences of the University of Buenos Aires to study law, but he dedicated little time to his first profession; he met Father Meinvielle during his studies, and joined the summation groups that he directed. Influenced by the reading of Thomas Aquinas, played by Meinvielle, Sacheri began studying philosophy at the UBA. He graduated in 1957, and with a scholarship from the Arts Council of Canada he moved to Laval University (Quebec) to study philosophy under the direction of the Canadian Thomist Charles de Koninck. He graduated in 1963, and five years later obtained his doctorate with a thesis on The Existence and Nature of Deliberation.

He returned to Argentina in 1967, where he took over the work of the Cité catholique, in place of engineer Roberto Gorostiaga. He obtained a teaching position at UBA -teaching Philosophy of Law and History of Philosophical Ideas- and at the recently created Argentine Catholic University -Scientific Methodology and Social Philosophy-, where he was invited by Bishop Octavio Nicolás Derisi. He would later become a visiting professor at the Institute of Comparative Philosophy in Paris, teaching Ethics and Social Philosophy, at Laval University, and at Andrés Bello University in Caracas.

On December 22, 1974, at the age of 41, he was murdered in the city of Buenos Aires in front of his family as he was returning from Mass by a commando of the ERP-22 de Agosto guerrilla organization, who acknowledged the fact in a communiqué and, moreover, a file detailing the crime was later found in a building belonging to that organization.

== In popular culture ==
In Argentinian Catholic circles Carlos is seen as a martyr killed for his beliefs, he is renowned for his intellect and charity.

== Bibliography ==
- 1968: Necessity and Nature of Deliberation
- 1970: The Clandestine Church
- 1974: The Church and the Social
- 1980: The Natural Order
