= Society for Irish Latin American Studies =

The Society for Irish Latin American Studies (SILAS) was created in 2003 to study Ireland's role in Latin America.

== History ==
It was founded on 1 July 2003 to promote the study of relations between Ireland and Latin American countries. SILAS's range of interest includes the settlement, lives, and achievements of Irish emigrants to Latin America and their descendants, as well as the contemporary presence of Ireland in the life and culture of Latin America and the presence of Latin Americans in Ireland.

SILAS was originally established as the "Irish Argentine Historical Society", with a principal focus on the different aspects of Irish emigration to Argentina, and the development of the Irish-Argentine community. In order to reflect the members' interest in other Latin American countries and regions, in 2005 the organisation's name was changed to Society for Irish Latin American Studies.

The first undertaking of SILAS was the publication of Irish Migration Studies in Latin America open-access journal. Other SILAS activities include research projects, publishing of studies and essays, funding of fellowships, grants and research prizes, organisation of field trips, educational programmes and conferences, and involvement in restoration and museum projects. Announcements are regularly published through the web site. The Society is open to any discipline, to any historical period, and to any methodological approach. SILAS is a non-profit international organisation incorporated in Geneva under the Swiss laws.

== See also ==
- Irish diaspora
