= Carlos Cossio =

Argentinian law professor (1903–1987)

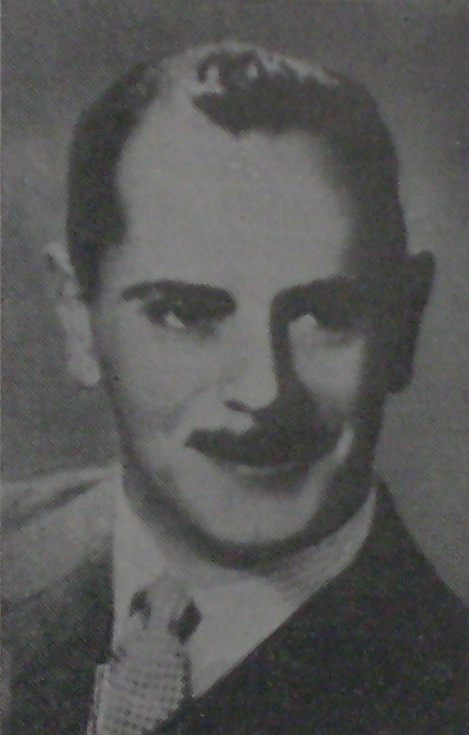
- Born: February 3, 1903; San Miguel de Tucuman
- Died: August 24, 1987 (aged 84); Buenos Aires

Carlos Cossio (February 3, 1903 – August 24, 1987) was an Argentinian militant university reformer, jurist, lawyer, legal philosopher and professor. One of his most important works is the concept of the Egological Theory of Law.

== Biography ==
Cossio had his primary and secondary education in Tucumán, then moved to Buenos Aires to study Law at the University of Buenos Aires, where he joined the university reform movement, being one of the leaders of the Student Center. He completed his doctoral thesis on the topic of "The University Reform and the Problem of the New Generation," published in 1927.

From 1934 to 1948, he taught at the National University of La Plata where he began to develop his theories on egological law. In 1948, he took over the Chair of Philosophy of Law at the University of Buenos Aires, where he finished the definition of his original conception of law. He was surrounded by a large group of followers and disciples, including Ambrose Lucas Gioja, Julio Cesar Cueto Rua, Genaro Carrió, José Vilanova, Daniel Herrendorf, Enrique Aftalion, and Carlos Spini, who formed the "Argentina Legal School." During this time, his recognition and prestige reached a level no one had imagined. His definition of law as "interference intersubjective behaviors" brought him into a controversy with Hans Kelsen, creator of the Pure Theory of Law, at the same law school in Buenos Aires in 1949.

In 1956, he was forced to leave his position as chair by the military government of Pedro Eugenio Aramburu because of his alleged sympathy for the Peronists, and it was only in 1973 when he could return thanks to the efforts of his friend and disciple, Julio Raffo. The military and its supporters largely destroyed the strength of the "Argentina Law School" and its potential for expansion. The liberal bourgeoisie and the political right never forgave their devotion to their independent politics and the fact that they never supported a political party, instead ardently defending their ideas and proposals. Cossio did respond to an official survey on the then possible constitutional reform that materialized in 1949. While many of his colleagues didn't comment, instead distancing themselves during the military dictatorships of General Juan Carlos Ongania and Jorge Rafael Videla, the old professor spoke out against the regime and condemned the human rights violations.

His major work is Ideology and Law, developed from the concept of phenomenology of judgment, the judge's process of interpretation and understanding of the law, and the ideological and class backgrounds of liberal capitalist law. In his early thesis in the publication The Law, Cossio explained that what judges do affects everyone and that what judges do remains hidden, both for themselves and for those who are subject to their decisions. "We are all involved in what judges do, good or bad, and not just for what might be perceived at first glance", Cossio says, "but much more because all of them, day by day and hour by hour, they do something for the right wing or the left wing, and also for democracy or totalitarianism, gravitating over the social life specifically, as agents of the law". Those judges often ignore the scope of their duties "because the said contribution being something more vivid than a thought, is on the basis of the situation that those agents of the law defend, a situation inevitably referred to the leading social structures".

Cossio accepted the Pure Theory of Law of Hans Kelsen, and made it an important part of his own theory. However, the tension between the two visions was always present. Cossio accepted positive law, but did not accept the mechanistic normativism as the object of legal science. Cossio distinguished himself by demonstrating that law should be understood and interpreted by a theory of knowledge with respect to human behavior in intersubjective interference. It was not just about ideal legal subjects (normativism mechanistic) but about people, real human beings: "the law as human behavior."

Cossio's work asserted that, "The judge looks at the law not as conclusive and finished, but as something that is constantly making its living character of human life."

His work, unlike his skeptics', was translated into French, English, the former Yugoslavic language (now Bosnian, Serbian, Croatian, and Montenegrin), German, Polish, Portuguese, Finnish, Swedish, and other languages. In 1986 he received the Konex Award for his development of the Humanities in Argentina.

The egological theory of law is one of the most outstanding expressions of the Latin American cultural movement influenced by the university reform. Its main followers are Daniel Herrendorf (Luxemburg), Albert Brimo (Paris) and Julio Cesar Cueto Rua (Buenos Aires).

Cossio was also an excellent Poet, though continually neglected by the Argentinian Society of Writers. His most well-known poem is "Agua herrada" (Losada, Buenos Aires, 1964).

== The Egological Theory of Law ==
Its development appeared in his book entitled "The egological theory of law and the legal concept of freedom," whose first edition was published in 1944, and twenty years later, a second edition was published by the printer Abeledo-Perrot, a traditional legal publisher in Buenos Aires, Argentina. His ideas took shape around 1941 and drew from Edmund Husserl, the last great classical philosopher, and delved into Kant, Martin Heidegger and Hans Kelsen. Husserl used the theory of objects (regional ontologies) acts theory and difference, butt, Kantian root, between formal legal logic and transcendental legal logic. Cossio's contribution was a legal philosophy of science that struck alike the religious mood of Thomistic natural law and legal positivism from the nineteenth century, renovated by the technical-legal. Parthian positive law with Cossian construction shelved the mechanistic normativism as an object of legal science to study the right understanding and interpreting by a theory of knowledge about human behavior in intersubjective interference. Cossio said that the philosophy of law should be studied from the dogmatic science of law and that science was a kind of knowledge crucial for philosophical reflection. In this work, he drew back the veil on the ideological background capitalistic conceptions of Hans Kelsen's formal logic. Cossio said: 'Kelsen corresponds to a capitalist world and placed on the defensive from the seats of the State in a bourgeois Europe, undifferentiated, and therefore legal scrutiny should not be discussed political power and so their ideas can spread geographically that of Savigny; finally socially conservative groups are those that have been interpreted by those jurists who, as Gény or Kantorowicz, have spoken and continue to speak of 'a resurrection of the eternal natural law.' Later he added: 'criminal liberalism has proclaimed to all the winds that would offend inability associations. As its specific crime is unspeakable enrichment and as are the capitalists who are associated to enrich, obvious their interest to leave unpunished a crime that only they can practically commit '. Cossio concluded saying: "In short: the critical history of the legal conceptions, the errors tematizarlas as a criminal ideology Karl Marx. In this case scientific ideologies lead us to thematize them as an epistemology of error.

== Egológic ==
"Egologic" is a word which the author explains in a previous work "The Theory egological law: Their problem and its problems", also appeared under the printer Abeledo-Perrot in Buenos Aires in 1963. In his own words: "It seems appropriate to an illustrious parallel in order to understand our language: Phenomenology, composed voice of phenomenon and logos, meaning knowledge of phenomena. But Hegel, reversing the priority of voices components, used to signify the logos phenomenalization and this logo on your system the absolute spirit. And we know that Husserl investment has remained Hegelian significance, except that the logos for him, is the being of entities. Therefore for Husserl, phenomenology means phenomenalization of the being of entities. Similarly, egology in egological theory of law, is the meaning of egolization of legal logos, ie egolization of being legal (given the phenomenological equivalence between the logos and be). And there is talk that the transcendental ego is the action, "I act" of any action in instead of "I think" all judgment, "I act" of behavior instead of "I think" the intellect, with egology phenomenalization We could mean as being legal conduct."

== Fundamental thesis ==
The synthesis of thought can be expressed egological in the following propositions: a) the right to conduct interference is intersubjective; b) the law considers all human actions; c) the right is interested in the human act in its unity, d) the right implies the possibility of acts of force; e) freedom is the right content ineliminable f) legal norms conceptualize interference behavior intersubjective g) legal rules and penalties are charged disjunctive judgments, differing from [Hans Kelsen] understanding that the standard was a hypothetical judgment.

== Hans Kelsen Controversy ==
The relevance of the theory in the field egological the right can be seen the significant fact that the Austrian jurist Hans Kelsen visited in 1949 the University of Buenos Aires in Argentina and engaged in a famous debate with him:

His controversy with Kelsen was reproduced in the book Theory egological and pure theory. During Kelsen's visit to Argentina, in 1951, Cossio said the physicalist metaphysics he hid static and dynamic traffic Viennese Professor pretemático who performed at that point, between the representative-level conceptual and intuitive plane-real. Probably not worked the work of French Michel Foucault, by the way of intuition in knowledge, but went ahead with these ideas applied to the philosophy of science of law, to the French. This allowed him to dabble in the activity of the judge and make a phenomenological description of the court judgment. Among the elements of the sentence, Cossio recognized three aspects:

a) Legal Structure: the law given a priori; b) Representations contingent: no insults circumstances; and c) Experience of Judge: Legal assessment.

It was not idealist-metaphysical aspects (normativism mechanistic) but people, real human beings (the right as human behavior). Thus the normative logic was inserted in plenary life without losing its significant role. The first judge's immanence in the law, is 'strictly ontic' as concerns the being of things described. So Cossio says that the judicial creation of the judge's ruling requires meaningful behavior. The judicial creation of the judgment by the judge makes do with evidence that this is not a separate entity and foreign law. 'The judge said Cossio-watching law and not as conclusive as fact, but as something that is constantly making its living character of human life' and added: 'The judicial function is a real analytic a priori within the notion of a logic of what should be '. In the last years of his life, during the years of the military dictatorship (1976–1983), participated with Ernesto Giudice in the dissemination activities organized by the University Reform Fundación Juan B. Right. Separation from their chairs Cossio not prevent him from thinking but I felt a great pain for not being able to collaborate in the formation of law students. He received awards, was recognized abroad, served as co-director of the Revue Internationale du Droit of Theorie, managing to form a huge galaxy of legal discípulos.ción.

== Principal works ==
- El concepto puro de la revolución (ed. Bosch, 1936).
- La valoración jurídica y la ciencia del derecho (1.ª ed., UNL, 1941; 2.ª ed., Arayú; 1954).
- La Política como Conciencia (Abeledo-Perrot, 1955).
- Ideología y Derecho (Inédito, 1962).
- La teoría egológica del derecho y el concepto jurídico de libertad (1.ª ed. 1944, Losada; 2.ª ed. 1964, Abeledo-Perrot).
- La plenitud del ordenamiento jurídico. (1.ª ed., Losada, 1939; 2.ª ed., Losada, 1947 y Los Andes, 2005)
- El Derecho en el Derecho Judicial. (1.ª ed., Kraft, 1945; 2.ª ed., Abeledo-Perot, 1959 y El Foro, 2002; 3.ª ed., Abeledo-Perrot, 1967)
- Teoría de la verdad jurídica. (Losada, 1954; El Foro, 2007)
- La opinión pública.
- La causa y la comprension en el derecho. (4.ª ed., Juerez Editor, 1969)
- El fundamento filosófico de los métodos interpretativos. (UNL, 1940).
- El principio "nulla poena sine lege" en la axiología egológica (Rev. LL, 1947).
