= Beatriz Sarlo =

Argentine literary and cultural critic (1942–2024)

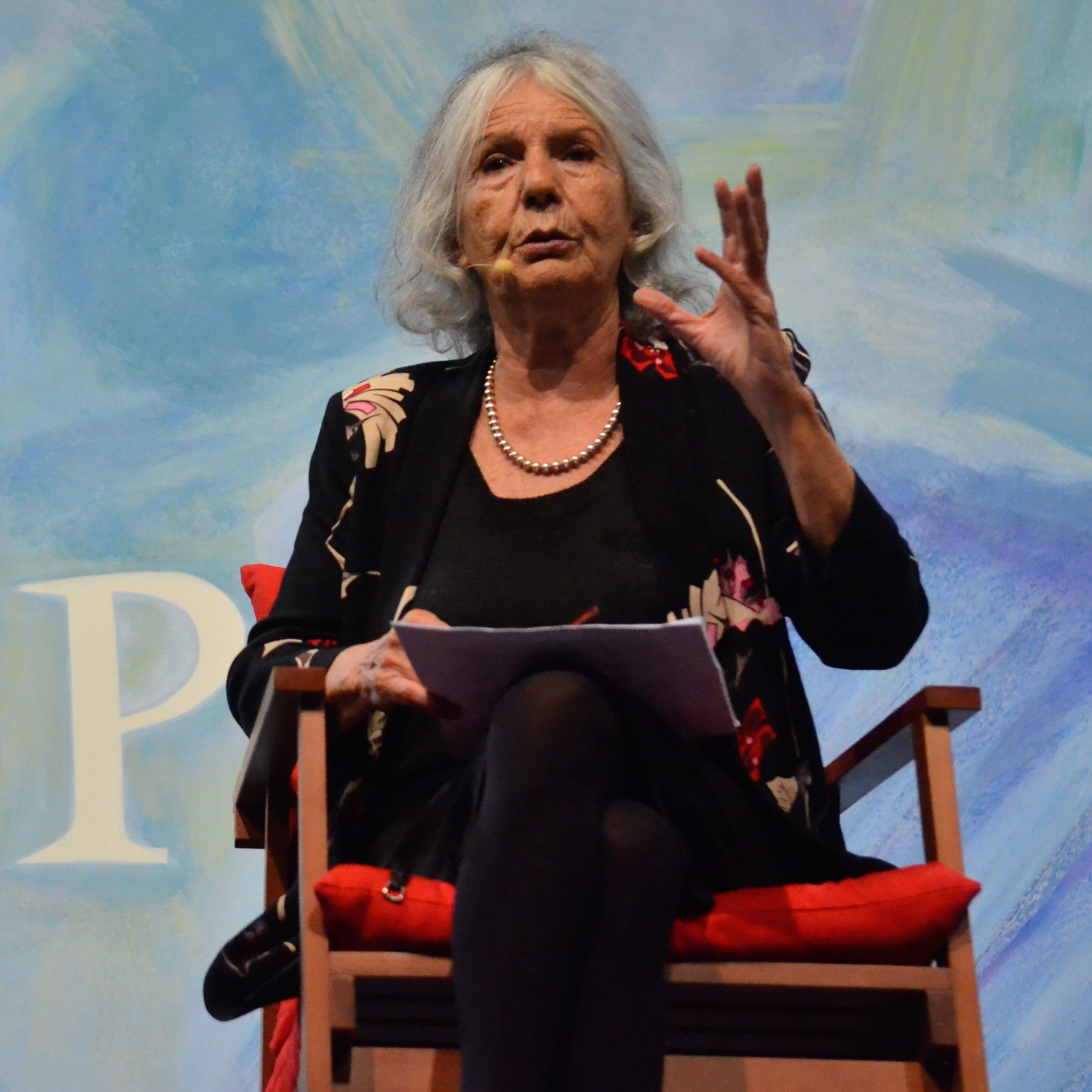
- Sarlo in 2015
- Born: 29 March 1942; Buenos Aires, Argentina
- Died: 17 December 2024 (aged 82); Buenos Aires, Argentina
- Education: University of Buenos Aires
- Occupations: Literary and cultural critic

Beatriz Sarlo (29 March 1942 – 17 December 2024) was an Argentine literary and cultural critic. She was a founding editor of the cultural journal Punto de Vista ("Point of View"). She became an Order of Cultural Merit laureate in 2009.

== Biography ==
Beatriz Sarlo was born on 29 March 1942. She studied literature at the undergraduate and graduate levels at the University of Buenos Aires. The writer, critic, and dramatist David Viñas was an early mentor and influence. In 1978, she co-founded Punto de Vista which was one of the major dissident voices during the military regime which ended in 1983. Because of the authoritarian nature of the regime, Sarlo and her fellow contributors had to use pseudonyms, and subordinate political questions to aesthetic ones. Paradoxically, this entailed a rethinking of the political which moved Sarlo's thought away from an earlier tendency to Marxism and other forms of radicalism. She has continued to maintain a moderate-left political stance that refrains from promoting euphorias of free-market thought or populist solidarity.

Sarlo was a highly laurelled academic who also operated as a public intellectual. She has written both on traditional literary topics—her book on Jorge Luis Borges, published in 1993, is one of the seminal works on the great Argentine fabulist—but she has also worked in more cultural areas, such as feminism, the emergence of the modern Argentine city, and Argentina's divided sense of its place in Latin America. These various interests are linked by an overall concern with the intellectual and how the idea of the intellectual functions in contemporary discursive contexts. Sarlo was not a parochial or regional thinker, but participated in global debates occasioned by critical theory, postmodernity, and the destabilization of set political ideologies after the Revolutions of 1989. She has warned, though, against the naive transnationalism seen in an earlier Argentine intellectual, Victoria Ocampo. In some ways, Sarlo's project is analogous to the work of thinkers of the previous generation such as Ángel Rama in its ability to traverse disciplinary and discursive boundaries, though Rama specifically has not been a huge influence on Sarlo.

Sarlo has worked with other major contemporary Argentine thinkers such as Carlos Altamirano and Ricardo Piglia. She held the Chair of Contemporary Literature at the Faculty of Arts and Letters at the University of Buenos Aires. In 2001, she was denied a position as the equivalent of distinguished professor, in controversial circumstances. She has also taught at several US universities, held the Simón Bolívar chair at the University of Cambridge, and been a visiting fellow at the Wissenschaftskolleg zu Berlin. She also wrote regularly for Argentine newspapers such as La Nación, Clarín (for which she wrote a weekly column), and Página 12.

Sarlo died on 17 December 2024 in Buenos Aires, three weeks after suffering a stroke.

=== Falkland Islands remarks ===
In August 2021, Sarlo said during an interview that the Falkland Islands are British territory, sparking condemnation from veterans and government officials. Parts of the opposition defended her stance, as she said that she "cared very little" about criticism of her remarks. Sarlo said that the Falklands are like the south of Scotland and that the Argentine claim was made before Argentina was fully formed as a nation. She also stated that the 1982 invasion was a "national psychotic act".

== Publications ==
- [with Carlos Altamirano] Literatura-sociedad (Buenos Aires: Edicial, 1982).
- [with Carlos Altamirano] Ensayos argentinos: de Sarmiento a la Vanguardia (Buenos Aires: Ceal, 1983; Buenos Aires: Ariel, 1997).
- El imperio de los sentimientos: Narraciones de circulación periódica en la Argentina, 1917-1927 (Buenos Aires: Catálogos, 1985; 2000; Buenos Aires: Siglo XXI, 2011). ISBN 978-950-9314-07-8
- Una modernidad periférica: Buenos Aires, 1920 y 1930 (Buenos Aires: Nueva Visión, 1988).
- [with Carlos Altamirano] Conceptos de sociología literaria (Buenos Aires: CEDAL [Centro Editor de América Latina], 1990).
- La imaginación técnica: Sueños modernos de la cultura argentina (Buenos Aires: Nueva Visión, 1992).
- Borges, un escritor en las orillas (1993; Buenos Aires: Ariel, 1995; 1998).
- Escenas de la vida posmoderna: Intelectuales, arte y videocultura en la Argentina (Buenos Aires: Ariel, 1994; 2004).
- Martín Fierro y su crítica: Antología (Buenos Aires: Centro editor de América Latina, 1994).
- Instantáneas: Medios, ciudad y costumbres en el fin de siglo (Buenos Aires: Ariel, 1996).
- La máquina cultural: Maestras, traductores y vanguardistas (Buenos Aires: Ariel, 1998).
- Siete ensayos sobre Walter Benjamin (Buenos Aires: Fondo de Cultura Económica, 2000). ISBN 978-950-557-383-7
- La batalla de las ideas, 1943-1973 (Buenos Aires: Ariel, 2001).
- Tiempo presente (Buenos Aires: Siglo XXI, 2001).
- La pasión y la excepción (Buenos Aires: Siglo XXI, 2003).
- Tiempo pasado: Cultura de la memoria y giro subjetivo (Buenos Aires: Siglo XXI, 2005).
- Escritos sobre literatura argentina (Buenos Aires, Siglo XXI, 2007).
- La ciudad vista: Mercancías y cultura urbana (Buenos Aires, Siglo XXI, 2009).
- La audacia y el cálculo: Kirchner 2003-2010 (Buenos Aires: Sudamericana, 2011).
- Signos de Pasión: Claves de la novela sentimental del Siglo de las Luces a nuestros días (Buenos Aires: Biblos, 2012).
- Ficciones Argentinas: 33 Ensayos (Buenos Aires: Mardulce, 2012).
- Viajes: De la Amazonia a Malvinas (Buenos Aires: Seix Barral, 2014).
- Zona Saer (Santiago: Ediciones Universidad Diego Portal, 2016).

=== English translations ===
- Borges: A Writer on the Edge (Verso 2007) ISBN 978-1-84467-588-3
- Scenes from Postmodern Life (2001, tr. Jon Beasley-Murray)
- The Technical Imagination: Argentina's Modern Dreams (2007)
