= Jordán Bruno Genta =

Argentine far-right figure

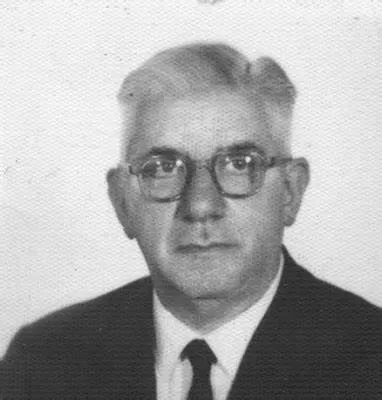
- Born: 2 October 1909; Buenos Aires, Argentina
- Died: 27 August 1974 (aged 64); Buenos Aires, Argentina
- Occupations: Philosopher, writer and journalist
- Writing career
- Language: Spanish

Jordán Bruno Genta (2 October 1909 – 27 August 1974) was an Argentine Catholic writer, philosopher, journalist and educator.

== Career ==
Born in Buenos Aires on October 2, 1909. He completed his secondary education at Colégio Nacional Mariano Moreno. He graduated from the Faculty of Philosophy and Literature at the University of Buenos Aires in 1933. The following year he began his teaching career at the Universidad Nacional del Litoral and at the Instituto del Profesorado de Paraná, where he taught Logic and Epistemology, Critique of Knowledge, Sociology and Metaphysics, subjects won by competition and antecedents. At the same time, he began a process of conversion to Christian philosophy, first, and to the Catholic faith, later.

In 1943 he was appointed Dean of the Universidad Nacional del Litoral and the following year he became rector of the Instituto del Profesorado de Buenos Aires, a position he held until his dismissal in May 1945. In 1946 he founded a private chair of philosophy, in which he taught until his death on October 27, 1974. His works include Fundamental Problems of Philosophy, Political Sociology, Psychology Course, The Philosopher and the Sophists, The Idea and Ideologies, Examination and Communism, Counter-Revolutionary War, Christian Political Option, in addition to numerous newspaper articles, courses and conferences.

He was murdered on October 27, 1974, by the ERP-22.

== Legacy ==
Genta would leave a legacy in Argentine Catholic nationalism. During the Malvinas War, the “Genta Factor” would be influential in the Argentine Air Force. And his works would be crucial to a counterrevolutionary understanding. He would also leave behind great students such as Antonio Caponnetto. https://www.ellitoral.com/opinion/jordan-bruno-genta_0_MUlp93K4vm.html
