= Oscar Terán =

Argentine philosopher

Oscar Terán (1938 – 21 March 2008, in Buenos Aires) was an Argentinean philosopher.

Terán was born in Carlos Casares, Buenos Aires. He left his hometown in 1959 to study philosophy in the Buenos Aires University where he devoted himself to the study of history with the help of his teacher José Luis Romero. In 1976 he was exiled in Mexico because of a military dictatorship. He was the author of numerous books and also a supporter of Marxism in the 1960s and 1970s, and the Alfonsinismo in the 1980s.

== Books ==
- Discutir Mariátegui. (Discuss Mariátegui) City of Mexico: Katún, 1985.
- En busca de la ideología Argentina. (Searching Argentinean ideology) Buenos Aires: Catálogos Editora, 1986.
- Nuestros años sesentas. La formación de la nueva izquierda intelectual Argentina, (Our years 'sixty's'. The formation of the new Argentinean intellectual left). 1956-1966. Buenos Aires: Ediciones El Cielo por Asalto, 1993.
- Las palabras ausentes: Para leer los Escritos póstumos de Alberdi. (The missing words: To read Alberdi's posthumous writings) Buenos Aires: Fondo de Cultura Económica, 2004.
- Ideas en el siglo. Intelectuales y cultura en el siglo XX latinoamericano (Century Ideas. Intellectuals and culture in the Latin american twentieth century) Buenos Aires: Siglo Veintiuno Editores, 2004.
- De utopías, catástrofes y esperanzas: Un camino intelectual. (Utopias, catastrophes and hopes: An intellectual way.) Buenos Aires: Siglo Veintiuno Editores, 2006.
- Para leer el Facundo. Civilization y Barbarie. Cultura de fricción. (To read 'the Facundo'. Civilization and Barbarism. Friction culture.) Buenos Aires: Capital Intelectual, 2007.
- Historia de las ideas en la Argentina. Diez lecciones iniciales, 1810-1980. (History of the ideas in the Argentina. Ten initial lessons.) Buenos Aires: Siglo Veintiuno Editores, 2008.
