= Daniel Herrendorf =

Argentine writer, essayist and philosopher

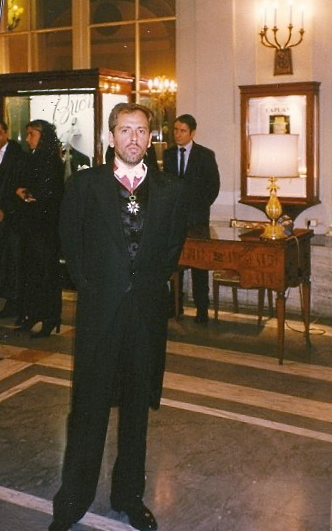
- Born: June 18, 1965; Buenos Aires, Argentina
- Known for: Writer, philosopher, essayist

Daniel Esteban Herrendorf (born June 18, 1965) is an Argentine writer, essayist and philosopher.

== Biography ==
Herrendorf studied political science in the Argentine Institute of Political and Social Sciences, founded by the Argentine legalist Carlos Fayt. Afterwards, he moved to Mexico City to study and teach philosophy, jurisprudence and epistemology at the National Autonomous University of Mexico.

Herrendorf moved to Europe, where he lived in Rome, Barcelona, and Paris. He served as an expert witness to the UN on human rights before joining the Argentine presidential cabinet.

His novel Memorias de Antínoo was translated into French by Michel J. Wagner and presented in 2013 at the Argentine embassy in Paris, by ambassador Juan Archibaldo Lanús, president of the International Society of Yourcenerian Studies Remy Piognault, vicepresident Jean-Pierre Castellani, and editor Samuel Tastet. It was the French academy's first time honoring the work of a foreign author.

Simultaneously with his studies, Herrendorf published a number of books and articles in journals in Mexico, Paris, Rome, Madrid, and Buenos Aires.

In 2004, alongside other intellectuals, Herrendorf created El Fondo de Cultura y Mecenazgo del Sur as an association to develop the arts.

== Fiction ==
- Evita, la loca de la casa, novela, Ed. Sudamericana, Buenos Aires, 2003.
- Memorias de Antínoo, novela Ed. Sudamericana, Buenos Aires 2000.
- El sueño de Dante, cuentos y relatos, Ed. Sudamericana, Buenos Aires 2000.

== Essays and articles ==
- Tratado de los derechos humanos, fundamentales y garantías individuales, 14 tomos, editorial Comisión Nacional de Derechos Humanos, Presidencia de los Estados Unidos Mexicanos, México DF, 2007.
- El poder de los jueces – cómo piensan los jueces que piensan, Ed. Abeledo-Perrot/Lexis-Nexis Buenos Aires 1994 (2ª. Ed.) y 1998 (3ª. Ed.). Ed. Universidad Veracruzana para la 1ª. Ed. México 1992.
- Los derechos humanos ante la justicia – Garantía de la Libertad Innominada, Ed. Abeledo-Perrot/Lexis-Nexis Buenos Aires, 1997.
- Autopsie de la science du droit – Pour une Phénoménologie de la Science du Droit, Université de Droit, d'Economie et des Sciences d'Aix-Marseille, Laboratoire de Théorie Juridique, Aix-en-Provence, Francia 1996
- El derecho a tener derechos, 1ª edición, Ed. Catálogos, Buenos Aires 1995. 2da. Edición, Ed. Catálogos, Buenos Aires 1996.
- La constitución reformada, obra colectiva (Vanossi, Barra, Raúl Alfonsín, Sagüés, Bidart Campos, Herrendorf, otros), Primer Seminario sobre la Reforma Constitucional de 1994, Ministerio del Interior de la República Argentina – Centro de Estudios Constitucionales de Madrid, Buenos Aires 1996.
- Derechos humanos y refugiados – La intemperie espiritual, Ed. Organización de las Naciones Unidas, ACNUR, sección para América Latina y el Caribe, 1994.
- Filosofía de los derechos humanos, Ed. Comisión Nacional de Derechos Humanos, México 1993.
- Sociología de los derechos humanos, Ed. Comisión Nacional de Derechos Humanos, México, 1992.
- Teoría general y política de los derechos humanos, Ed. Comisión Nacional de Derechos Humanos, México, 1992.
- Constitución y derechos humanos – Su reciprocidad simétrica, en coautoría con Germán J. Bidart Campos. Ed. Ediar, Buenos Aires 1992.
- La situación actual de la teoría general del derecho, Editorial Cárdenas, México, 1991.
- Principios de derechos humanos y garantías, en coautoría con Germán J. Bidart Campos, Ed. Ediar, Buenos Aires, 1991.
- El derecho internacional de los derechos humanos, Ed. Universidad Iberoamericana-Unión de Universidades de América Latina, México 1990
- Derechos humanos y viceversa, Ed. Comisión Nacional de Derechos Humanos, México, 1990.
- El poder de la policía en un sistema de derechos humanos, Ed. INACIPE (Instituto Nacional de Ciencias Penales), México, 1990.
- Las corrientes actuales de la filosofía del derecho, Editorial Ediar, Buenos Aires, 1989.
- Radiografía de la teoría egológica – Introducción a la fenomenología egológica, en coautoría con Carlos Cossio. Editorial Depalma, Buenos Aires, 1987.
