= Risieri Frondizi =

Argentine philosopher, anthropologist and rector

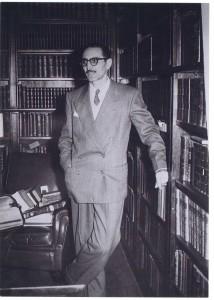
Risieri Frondizi

Risieri Frondizi (1910–1983) was an Argentine philosopher, anthropologist, and rector of the University of Buenos Aires.

== Background ==
Risieri Frondizi Ercoli was born on 20 November 1910 in Posadas, Argentina. His parents were Julio Frondizi and Isabel Ercoli, who had arrived in the 1890s from Gubbio, Umbria, Italy. Frondizi had seven brothers and six sisters. They included Arturo Frondizi (president 1958-1962), Ricardo (English professor) and Silvio (Marxist theorist, politician, and lawyer, assassinated in 1974). Frondizi studied at Harvard University. In 1943, Frondizi received his MA from the University of Michigan at Ann Arbor. In 1950, he received a doctorate from the National Autonomous University of Mexico.

== Career ==
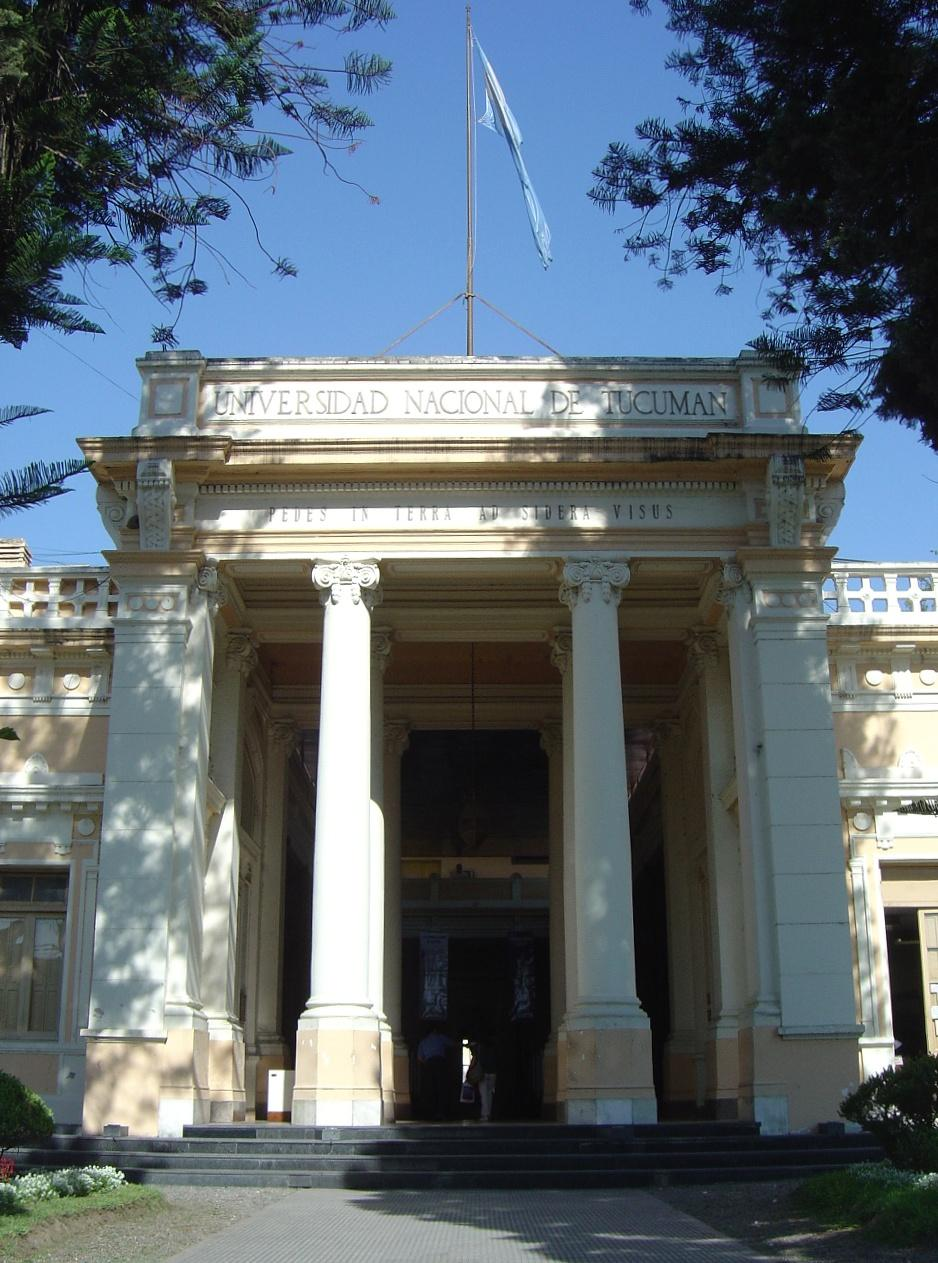
Rectorate building at the National University of Tucumán.

In 1935, Frondizi became a professor of philosophy at the National Institute of Teachers of Buenos Aires. In 1937, at the founding of National University of Tucumán, Frondizi became director of the Faculty of Philosophy and Letters through 1946. For academic year 1943–1944, he interrupted his teaching there to take advantage of a scholarship to pursue postgraduate studies at the University of Michigan at Ann Arbor, where he met Roy Wood Sellars and Dewitt Parker.

Frondizi was imprisoned, after which he accepted an invitation to teach at the Central University of Venezuela in Caracas for two academic years.

In October 1946, Frondizi was dismissed from the Argentine National University of Tucuman. In 1948, American philosophy professor Sidney Hook led a unanimous resolution in his division of the American Philosophical Association that demanded the Republic of Argentina to uphold academic freedom and specifically supported efforts by Frondizi to uphold academic freedom.

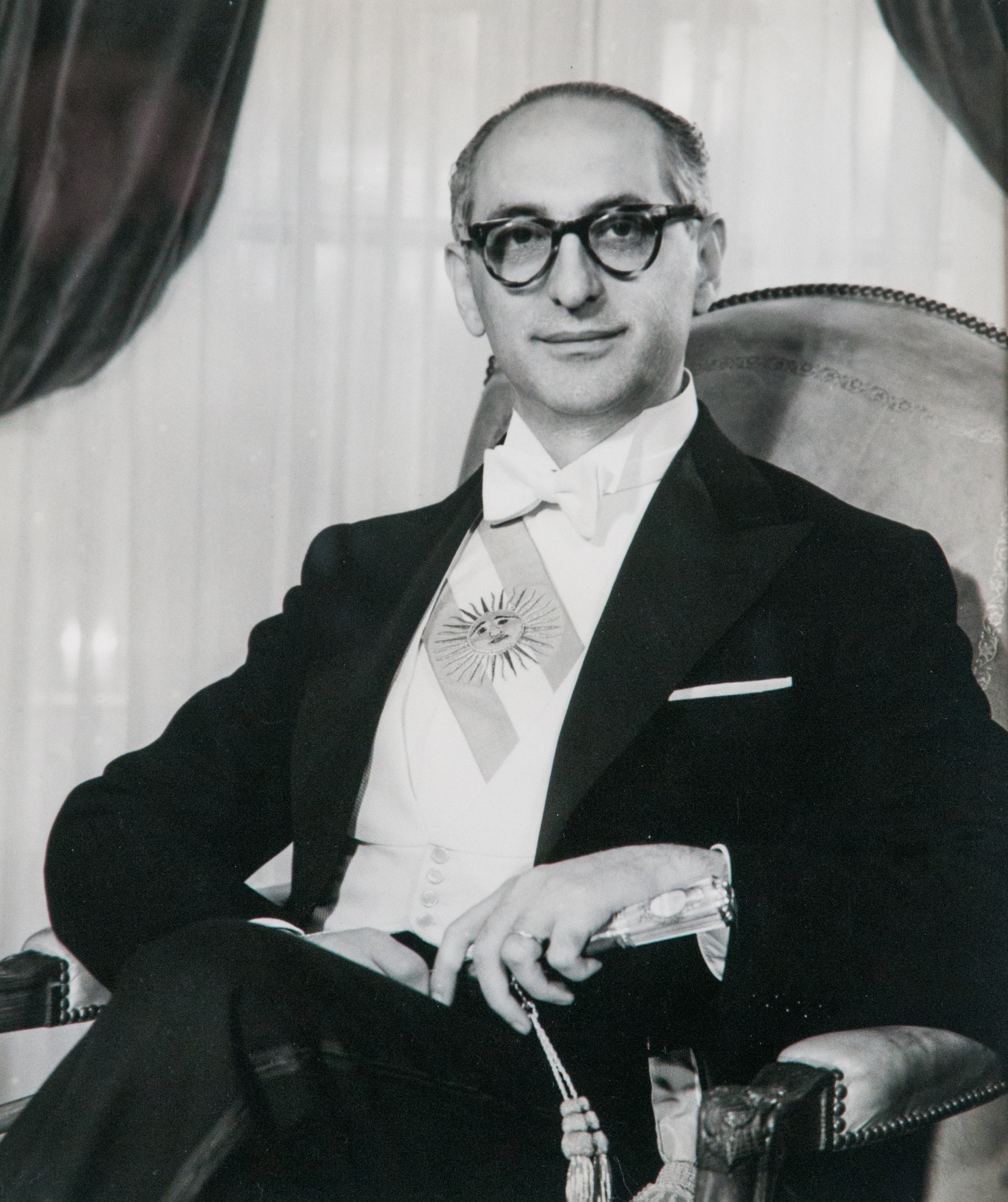
Official photo of Risieri Frondizi's brother Arturo Frondizi, then president of Argentina (1958)

In 1957, Frondizi became rector of the University of Buenos Aires. He promoted the construction of the University City and research activities. He founded the School of Public Health, supported a Department of Vocational Guidance, and extended the scholarship system to students and graduates. (In 1958, his brother Arturo Frondizi became president and was overthrown in 1962 by military coup supported by future president Juan Perón.)

During another coup in June 1966 (the self-designated Revolución Argentina (Argentine Revolution)), General Juan Carlos Onganía became de facto president, supported by several leaders of the General Confederation of Labour (CGT), among these the general secretary, Augusto Vandor. This led to a series of military-appointed presidents. In July 1966 Onganía ordered the forcible clearing of five facilities of the University of Buenos Aires (UBA) on July 29, 1966 by the Federal Police, an event known as La Noche de los Bastones Largos ("The Night of the Long Batons"). These facilities had been occupied by students, professors and graduates (members of the autonomous government of the university) who opposed the military government's intervention in the universities and revocation of the 1918 university reform. The university repression led to the exile of 301 university professors, including Manuel Sadosky, Tulio Halperín Donghi, Sergio Bagú, and Risieri Frondizi.

In later years, Frondizi taught at the University of Pennsylvania, Yale University, the University of Puerto Rico, the University of Southern Illinois at Carbondale, the University of Texas at Austin, UCLA, Carleton College, and Baylor University.

== Personal life and death ==
Frondizi served as president for the Union of Latin American Universities as well as the Latin American society of Philosophy. He was a member of the International Institute of Philosophy in Paris.

Frondizi died aged 72 on 23 February 1983 at a hospital in Waco, Texas, of a heart attack, while teaching at Baylor.

== Works ==
Frondizi published 15 books and more than 100 articles, including:

- El punto de partida del filosofar (The starting point of the philosopher) (1945)
- ¿Qué son los valores? (What are values?) (1958)
- Hacia la universidad nueva (Towards the new university) (1958)
- La universidad y sus misiones (The university and its missions) (1959)
- La Universidad en un mundo de tensiones. Misión de las Universidades en América Latina (The University in a world of tensions: Mission of the Universities in Latin America) (1971)
- Introducción a los problemas fundamentales del hombre (Introduction to the fundamental problems of man) (1977)
- Descartes (1991)

== See also ==
- List of Argentine philosophers
- Arturo Frondizi
- Silvio Frondizi
