= Arturo Frondizi =

32nd president of Argentina (1958–62)

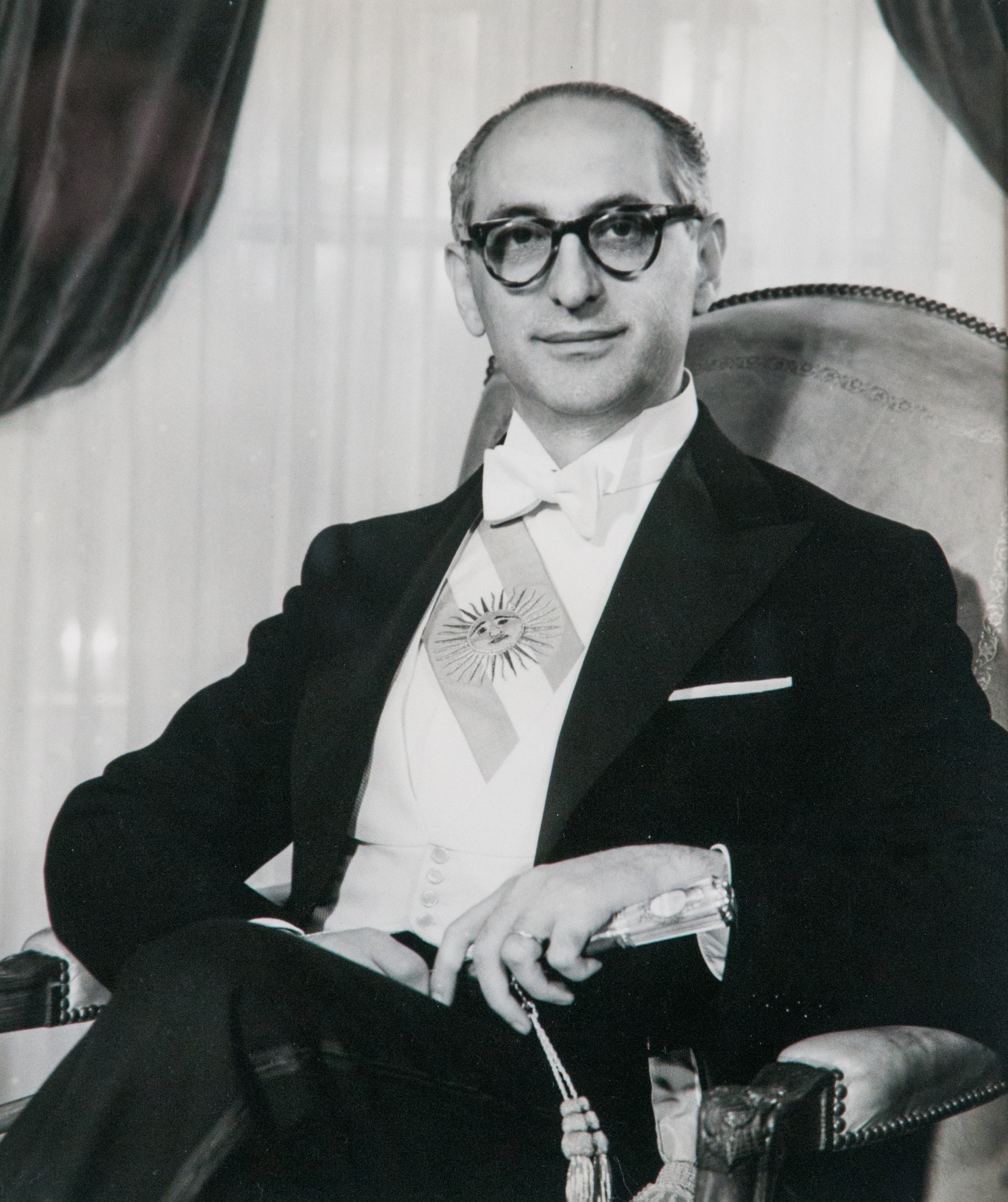
- Official portrait, 1958

32nd President of Argentina
- In office May 1, 1958 – March 29, 1962
- Vice President: Alejandro Gómez (May–Nov 1958); None (1958–1962)
- Preceded by: Pedro Eugenio Aramburu
- Succeeded by: José María Guido

National Deputy
- In office June 4, 1946 – June 4, 1952
- Constituency: Buenos Aires

Personal details
- Born: Arturo Frondizi Ércoli; October 28, 1908 Paso de los Libres, Corrientes, Argentina
- Died: April 18, 1995 (aged 86) Buenos Aires, Argentina
- Resting place: Basílica de la Inmaculada Concepción, Entre Ríos, Argentina
- Party: Radical Civic Union (1932–1956); Intransigent Radical Civic Union (1956–1963); Integration and Development Movement (1963–1986)
- Spouse: Elena Luisa María Faggionato (m. 1933; died 1991)
- Children: Elena Frondizi Faggionato
- Education: University of Buenos Aires
- Profession: Lawyer
- Arturo Frondizi's voice Recorded c. 1958-62

Arturo Frondizi Ércoli (Paso de los Libres, October 28, 1908 – Buenos Aires, April 18, 1995) was an Argentine lawyer, journalist, teacher, statesman, and politician. He was elected president of Argentina and governed from May 1, 1958, to March 29, 1962, when he was overthrown in a military coup. His government was characterized by its strong developmentalist policies (inspired by Rogelio Frigerio), that was less promoted by the State and more oriented to the development of heavy industry as a consequence of the entry of multinational companies.

A member of the Unión Cívica Radical (UCR) from the 1930s, Frondizi was one of the leaders who revived that party in the 1940s by founding the Intransigence and Renewal Movement, which opposed the military's role in politics. In 1946, he became national deputy for the city of Buenos Aires and unsuccessfully ran for vice president in the 1951 elections. After the Revolución Libertadora that overthrew President Juan Perón in 1955, Frondizi led the radical faction within the UCR that criticized the dictatorship against the faction led by Ricardo Balbín, which was closer to it. This led to the split of the party and the formation of the Intransigent Radical Civic Union (UCRI). Frondizi and Balbín faced off in the 1958 presidential elections with Peronism banned, and Frondizi won by a landslide, thanks to an agreement he or his entourage made with Perón, under circumstances that remain unclear.

Frondizi's labor, oil and education policies sparked sharp conflicts, with large demonstrations and strikes by the labor and student movements, as well as numerous attacks against the government. Frondizi responded by signing the Conintes Plan, which placed protesters under the jurisdiction of military tribunals and prohibited strikes. His foreign policy sought closer relations with the United States under John F. Kennedy, but maintained an independent line, supporting the Cuban Revolution, receiving Fidel Castro in Buenos Aires, and even meeting secretly with Che Guevara to try to mediate conflicts between the United States and Cuba, without success. He deepened international relations with Asian countries by making his first presidential visit to Indonesia, India, and Israel, and signed economic agreements with the Soviet Union. Following repeated pressures from the military, Frondizi was overthrown by a coup on March 29, 1962. He was detained by the military and prevented from participating in the 1963 elections.

During the National Reorganization Process, Frondizi maintained a wait-and-see attitude toward the military regime, while also being critical of some of the economic measures adopted by the regime. During the Falklands War in 1982, Frondizi and Raúl Alfonsín were the exception in the Argentine political landscape in opposing the conflict.

On April 18, 1995, Frondizi died of natural causes at the age of 86 in Buenos Aires.

== Early years ==
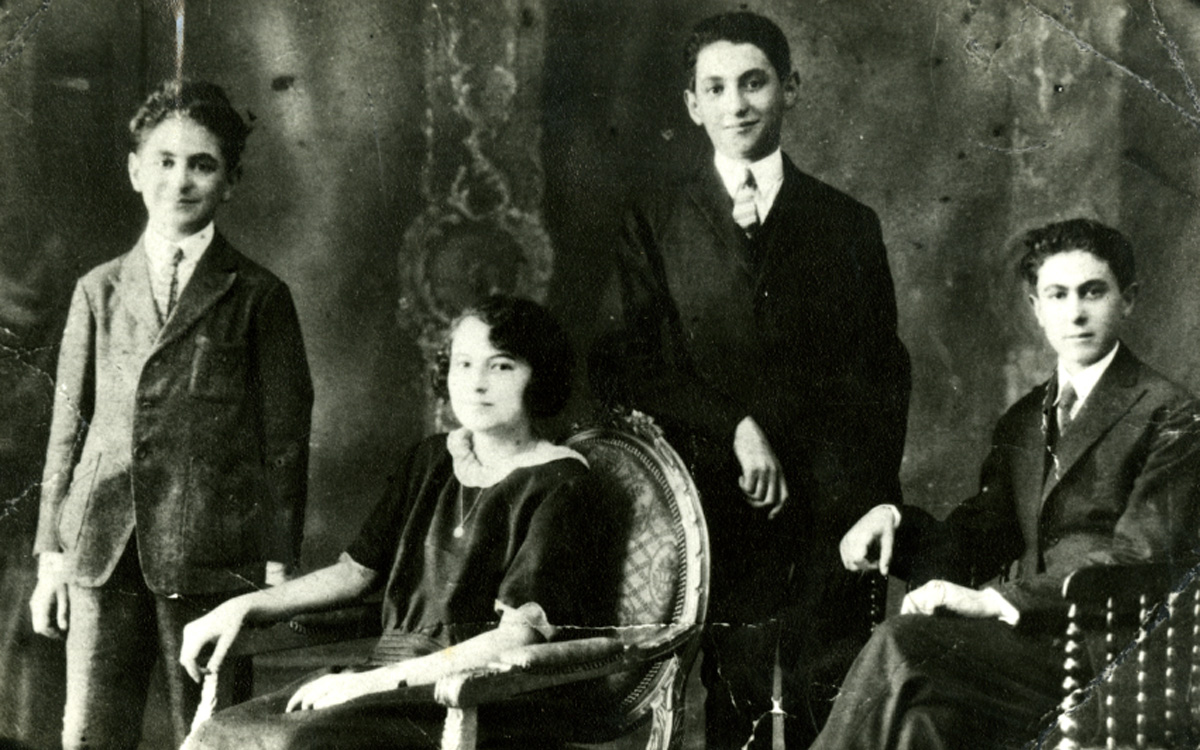
Three of the Frondizi brothers, Silvio, Arturo and Risieri, with their sister Liduvina; 1915.

Arturo Frondizi was born on October 28, 1908, in Paso de los Libres, Corrientes Province, Argentina. He was the thirteenth child of Isabella Ércoli de Frondizi and Giulio Frondizi. The couple, shortly after marrying, arrived in Argentina in the early 1890s from the Italian city of Gubbio. Giulio had learned the art of masonry from his father and made a comfortable living as a construction contractor.

The couple had a total of fourteen children, eight boys and six girls: Luidina (b. 1887), Ubaldo (b. 1888 and died at a young age), and Tersilia (b. 1889), all born in Italy, and Américo (b. 1896, future graduate in pharmacy), María (b. 1897 and died at a young age), Virginia (b. 1899, future primary school teacher), Ricardo Amadeo (b. 1900, future famous English teacher), Giulio (b. 1901, future civil servant), Isabella (b. 1903), Oreste (b. 1905, future civil servant), Silvio (b. 1907, future politician and lawyer, as well as a Trotskyist theorist, who would be assassinated by the Triple A in 1974), Liduvina (b.?), Arturo (b. 1908) and Risieri (b. 1910, future philosopher and rector of the University of Buenos Aires).

The family relocated to Concepción del Uruguay in 1912. Arturo and Silvio traveled in 1923 to the province of Buenos Aires, accompanied by their father. They attended the Mariano Moreno National School, where Risieri would also study later. In 1925, before completing the last year of high school, Arturo tried to enter the Colegio Militar de la Nación, but was deferred.

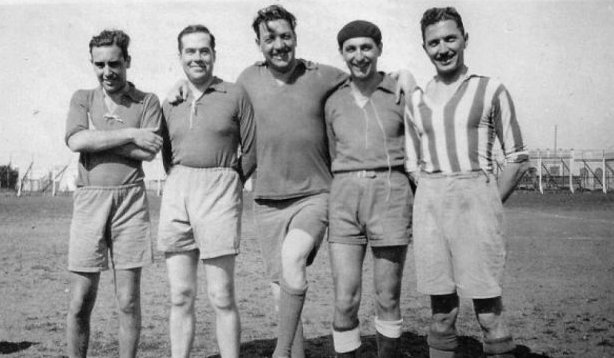
Arturo Frondizi (4th from left to right) during his tenure on Club Almagro, where he played in the 4th division.

In his youthful days, Arturo demonstrated minimal academic achievement, being more inclined towards sports, especially fútbol and boxing, than academic activities. Arturo was part of the youth division of Club Almagro from 1920 until 1926, competing as a central defender in the fourth division. This makes him the only Argentine president known to have competed as a registered football player in official AFA competition. In 1926, a serious fracture in his arm occurred during a match, forcing him to cease playing the sport for a long period. This, combined with his increased involvement in law and politics, marked a turning point that led to his eventual withdrawal from the sport.

During his later years of secondary education at the Colegio Nacional Mariano Moreno, Frondizi shifted his attention to his studies. During his fifth year of secondary school, his academic performance significantly improved, allowing him to earn recognition for his academic excellence. He became an accomplished student, participating in the school journal Estimulen.

== Beginnings in politics ==
Frondizi identified with Yrigoyenismo when he was a teenager and studying in high school. Hipólito Yrigoyen, "the father of the poor", had been elected president when Frondizi was eight years old and served his term when Frondizi was 14. For the first time in Argentine history, a president had been elected by secret and compulsory vote, in massively attended elections. Despite this, and throughout his university career, Frondizi had a negative view of political activity and vowed never to set foot in a local party.

In 1927, he entered the Law School of the University of Buenos Aires, where he graduated in July 1930. He refused to accept his diploma with honors, due to his refusal to receive it from the then de facto president José Félix Uriburu, who had overthrown Yrigoyen on September 6 of the previous year. His opposition to the dictatorship that overthrew Yrigoyen led him to participate in a demonstration on May 8, 1931, during which he was arrested and remanded to the custody of the provisional government.

His brother Silvio Frondizi filed a habeas corpus petition, the first in a life dedicated to defending political prisoners. The judge, however, also ordered the imprisonment of Silvio Frondizi, and both brothers were detained together for twenty days in the National Penitentiary located on Las Heras Street in Buenos Aires, a prison that Arturo would order demolished when he was president.

Frondizi said that this arrest convinced him to put aside his plans to teach in order to embark on a career as a politician. At the end of 1932, he was arrested for the second time and after being released he joined the Unión Cívica Radical.

In December 1933, he would be arrested for the third time, suspected of being involved in an uprising against the national government.

He led the Argentine League for the Rights of Man, the nation's first recorded human rights organization, upon its founding in 1936. In December of that year, he narrowly escaped an assassination attempt while addressing a crowd.

During the European conflict that would lead to World War II, Frondizi adopted an anti-fascist political stance from 1936, in opposition to the traditional neutralist stance that Argentina had held since World War I. By then, he was already known for his partisan activity, participating in number of ideological organizations. On May 1 of that year, he gave a speech on behalf of the UCR at a massive event of the Confederación General del Trabajo (CGT), where he shared the platform with the CGT's general secretary, José Domenech; former Radical president Marcelo T. de Alvear; Mario Bravo and Nicolás Repetto of the Socialist Party; Paulino González Alberdi for the Communist Party; and Lisandro de la Torre for the Democratic Progressive Party. Later that year he gave a lecture on the problem of antisemitism, as seen by an Argentinian, at the Enrique Heine Israelite Society.

== Deputy and Radical Civic Union (1946–1958) ==
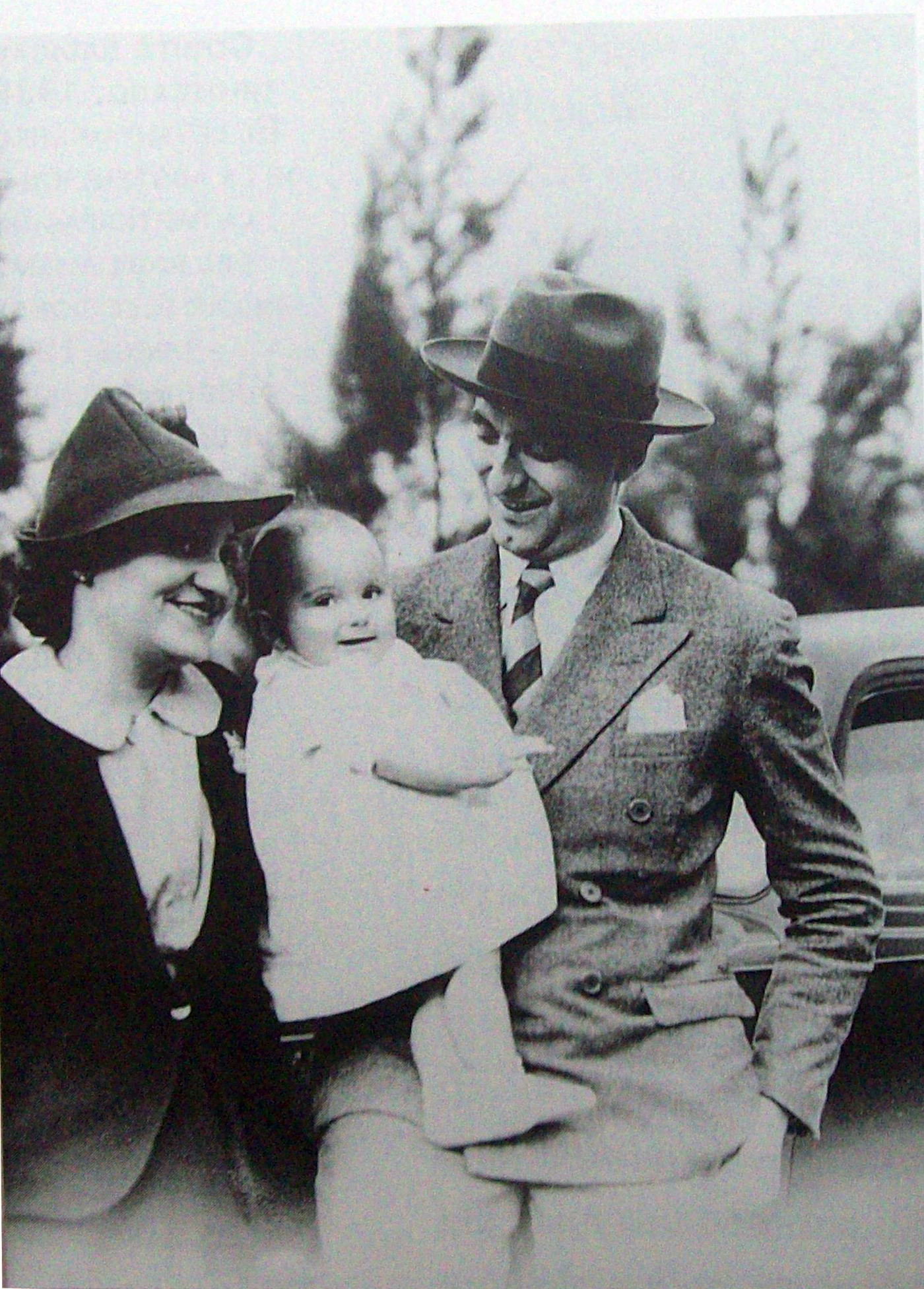
Photo of the Frondizi family in 1938.

Frondizi was part of a generation of young radicals who questioned the conservative leadership of Marcelo de Alvear and the official labor movement, advocating the economic nationalism of Hipólito Yrigoyen and proposing that the UCR adopt a center-left position. Supported and identified with the industrialist and nationalist policies promoted by Amadeo Sabattini as governor of the province of Córdoba, Frondizi and other young reformers such as Moisés Lebensohn, Ricardo Balbín, Arturo Illia, Crisólogo Larralde, and Alejandro Gómez organized a youth congress in Chivilcoy in May 1942, where the foundations were laid for the 'revolution' they attempted to impose on the party.

On April 4, 1945, he was part of the group of radical leaders, formed in opposition to the party's alliance with conservatives in the Democratic Union coalition, who met in the city of Avellaneda to reach agreement on the political foundations for a center-left and nationalist program that could respond to the new social, economic, and political realities that industrialization was producing in Argentina. The result was the 1945 Declaration of Avellaneda, a historic document that became one of the ideological foundations of the UCR.

In 1945, during the confrontation between Peronists and anti-Peronists, Frondizi supported the pro-labor measures promoted by Perón when he was Secretary of Labor, although he criticized the center-right educational policies and the authoritarian nature of the military government. During the events of October 1945, Frondizi was expelled from the Radical Assembly in the Federal Capital, accused of being a "collaborator" with Peronism. Shortly after, on November 1, 1945, these radical leaders met in Rosario to form the Movement of Intransigence and Renewal (MIR).

Frondizi was elected to the Argentine Chamber of Deputies in the February 1946 elections. The Democratic Union's electoral defeat by Peronism in the 1946 presidential elections sparked a profound debate within the URC and the resignation of the Unionist leadership. The intransigent movement then assumed leadership of the party, with two of its members, Ricardo Balbín and Arturo Frondizi, elected, respectively, president and vice president of the Radical bloc of national deputies, in the so-called Bloc of 44.

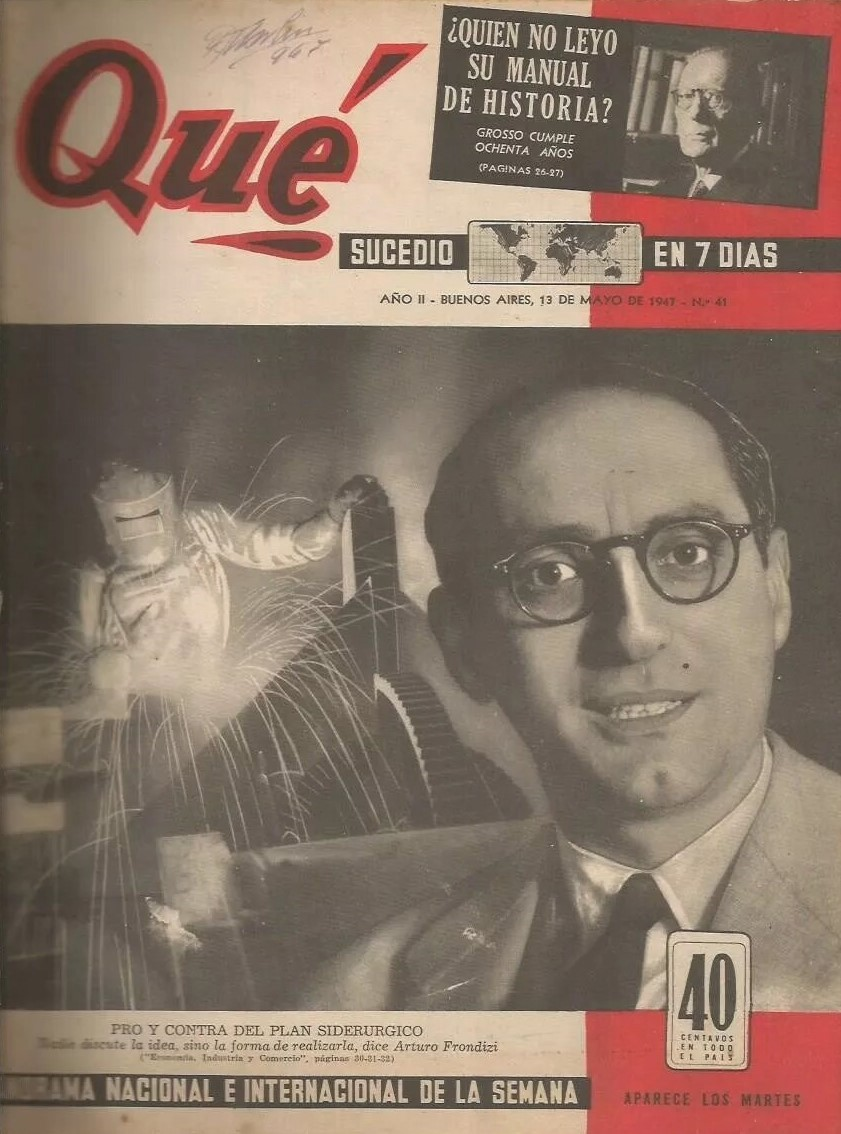
Arturo Frondizi on cover of Qué!, May 1947.

In early 1948, Frondizi was reelected as a deputy, with the MIR winning the internal elections in the Federal Capital. In December, Frondizi embarked on a tour of Latin America, the United States, Europe, and Africa.

His multiple political commitments did not prevent him from dedicating himself to intellectual activity, which is how at the end of 1954 he published Petroleum and Politics, an exposé of the activity of oil companies in Argentina, and spoke of YPF's monopoly of the oil sector. The book would become a best-seller the following year, during heated debates over the oil contracts signed by Perón and Standard Oil of California; thanks to this, Frondizi would position himself in the foreground of the national political scene, reinforcing his fame as an intellectual and his leftist profile.

== 1951 presidential election and subsequent coup ==
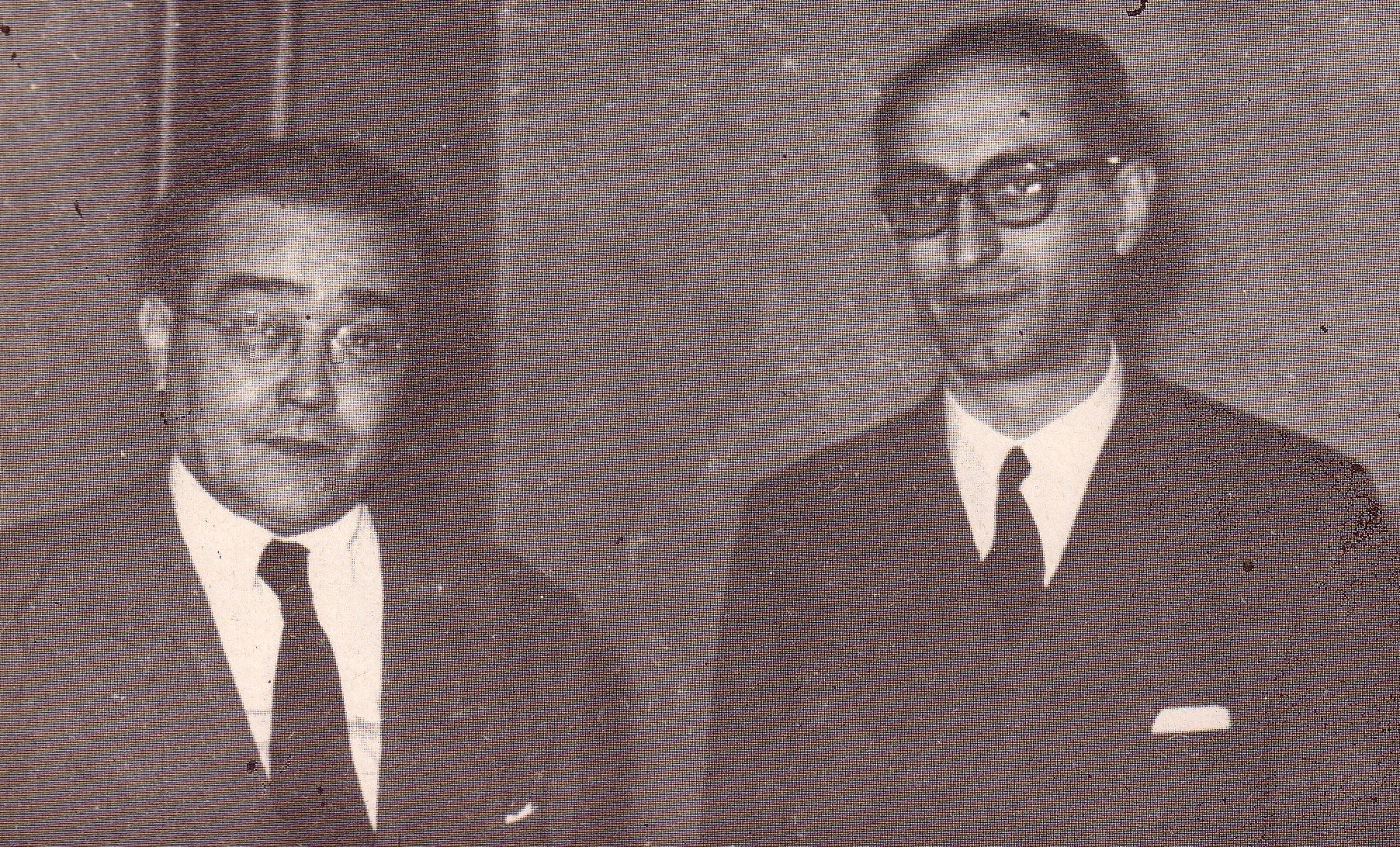
Frondizi and Ricardo Balbín.

In the 1951 presidential elections, he was nominated by the UCR as its candidate for vice president, with Ricardo Balbín the candidate for president. The ticket obtained 31.81% of the votes, being defeated by the Peronist slate, made up of Perón and Hortensio Quijano, who obtained 62.49%. In 1954, Frondizi was elected president of the National Committee of the UCR.

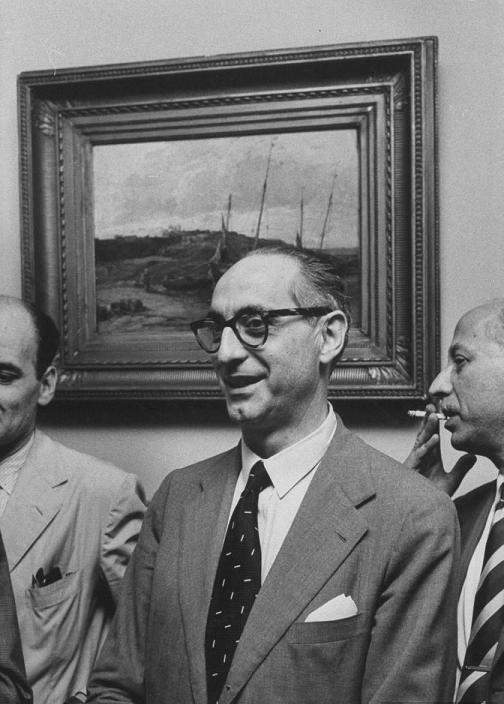
Arturo Frondizi on the UCR committee.

Later that year anti-Peronist civil and military sectors attempted a coup d'état against the constitutional government, led by General Benjamín Menéndez. Frondizi for the UCR, Américo Ghioldi for the Socialist Party, Democratic Progressive Horacio Thedy, and Reynaldo Pastor for the National Democrats (Conservatives) were informed of the upcoming military action and, according to Menéndez, pledged their support for the coup. The attempt ultimately failed, and some of its leaders were arrested.

On April 15, 1953 a bomb placed by an anti-Peronist civilian commando exploded in the middle of a workers' rally in the Plaza de Mayo, causing seven deaths and hundreds of injuries. In retaliation, at the end of the march, a group of protesters set fire to the Casa Radical and the Jockey Club. A few days later, the main radical leaders were arrested, including Frondizi.

On June 16, 1955, senior leaders of the UCR and the Navy organized a coup attempt to assassinate the president. To this end, they bombed the Plaza de Mayo, resulting in the deaths of more than 300 people. During this period, Frondizi was briefly detained for his connections to the coup plotters, as well as to radicals who were part of terrorist groups known as civil commandos.

On September 19, 1955 the military finally succeeded in deposing Perón. Perón went into exile and the military regime barred any reference to him or his late wife in public.

== The division of the UCR ==
On November 9, 1956, the National Convention of the UCR met in Tucumán. The Intransigence and Renewal Movement of the party led by Frondizi rejected cooperation with the military government; He proposed taking the initiative and putting pressure on him by appointing a presidential slate. The Balbinistas (now separated from the MIR), Unionists and Sabattinistas, closer to the military's Liberating Revolution, rejected the proposal.

The National Convention voted in favor of the intransigent proposal and chose Frondizi as the candidate for President. The Unionists, Balbinistas and Sabattinistas then left the Convention and on February 10, 1957 formed a new party, the Unión Cívica Radical del Pueblo, which represented the conservative wing of the UCR.

The intransigents also renamed the party the Unión Cívica Radical Intransigente. The party quickly defined a position inspired by the Declaration of Avellaneda, but adapted to the postwar situation, attracting a large number of youth and progressive sectors outside the party, such as the socialists Dardo Cúneo and Guillermo Estévez Boero and the writer and journalist Raúl Scalabrini Ortiz. These were characterized by a non-anti-Peronist national center-left position, as well as by the developmental thinking supported by Rogelio Frigerio from the magazine Qué!. Furthermore, Frondizi and Frigerio established a close relationship with the newspaper Clarín, to the point that until 1982 the newspaper identified itself with developmentalism and the future MID.

== 1958 elections ==
The campaign for the 1958 presidential elections had a high level of activism from the militants, who, in addition to doing their usual task of stickers, began to massively paint the walls of buildings with the names of the presidential slate. Such acts did not take long to arouse criticism from the press. It was the most expensive campaign up to that point in Argentine history. The party ordered the recording of a tango entitled "Frondizi, ¡Primero vos!", With lyrics and music by Daniel Quiroga.

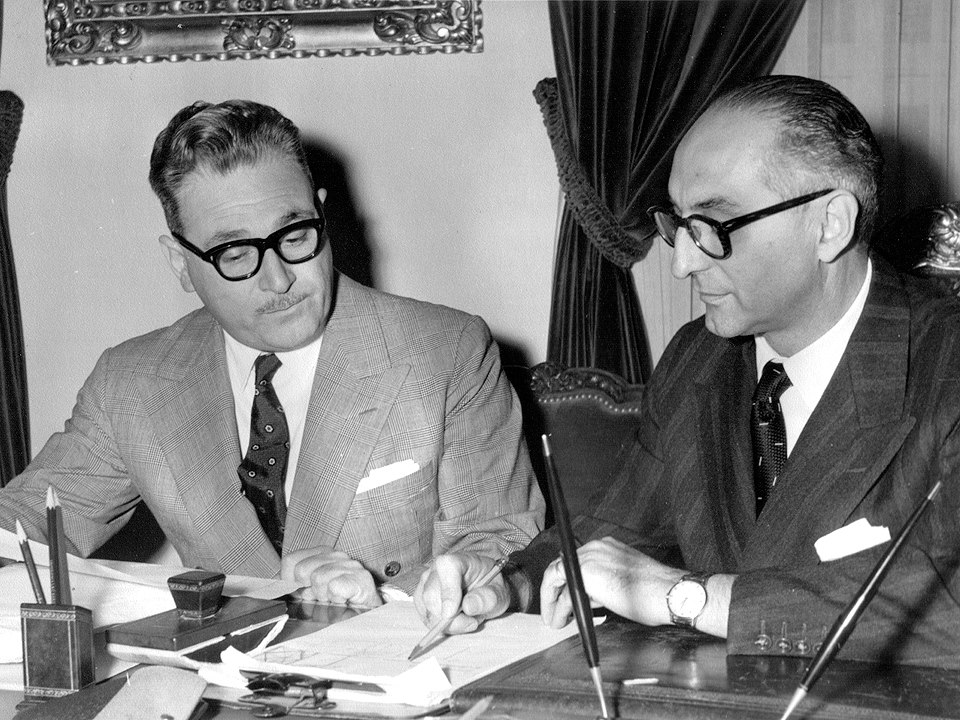
The famous Frondizi-Frigerio duo.

The military dictatorship decided to ban the Peronist Party in the 1958 elections. It also established that only those provinces that had a constitution in force as of December 1, 1957, could participate in it; the provincial constitutions had been abolished by the dictatorship through the military proclamation of 1956. Due to this, citizens of the provinces of La Pampa and Misiones were not allowed to participate in the election.

Three years after Perón fell victim to a military coup in 1955, Arturo Frondizi was elected president. Most historians accept that there was some kind of secret understanding between Perón and Frondizi for the proscribed Peronist vote to turn out in favor of the UCRI candidate. It is presumed that the pact was made through the efforts of Rogelio Frigerio, who made contact with John William Cooke or with Perón himself during his exile in Venezuela, agreeing on the conditions in various meetings held, first in Caracas in January 1958 and then in Ciudad Trujillo (Dominican Republic) in March 1958.

The pact would have consisted of Perón ordering his followers to vote for Frondizi, and if he won the elections, he would have to comply with fourteen points that made up the agreement, including normalizing the unions and the CGT, repealing the decrees prohibiting Peronism and order the return to Perón of the personal property that he had left in the country and the dictatorship had confiscated. Frondizi remained obligated to the strongly anti-Perón military establishment, however, and was forced to annul the election victory of the Peronist candidates in 1960.

The People's UCR proposed the Balbín-Del Castillo ticket, obtaining 2,416,408 votes, against the Intransigent UCR, which nominated Frondizi-Gómez, who triumphed with 4,049,230 votes. According to historian Félix Luna, the support that ensured Frondizi's success was heterogeneous: Peronists; Catholics and nationalists, sympathetic to the anti-divorce and free education stance defended by the UCRI; and left-wing sectors attracted by their progressive ideas. The 1958 presidential elections had the highest voter turnout in Argentine history and also the highest number of blank votes in a presidential election, reaching 90.86% and 9.26%, respectively. On May 1, General Pedro Eugenio Aramburu handed over power to Arturo Frondizi, the president elected on February 23, 1958.[28][24][48]

The UCRI won in all the provinces where the Frondizi-Gómez ticket was presented, claiming all the governorships, the senate and two thirds of the chamber of deputies, in a victory unequalled until today. On May 1, General Pedro Eugenio Aramburu handed over command to Frondizi following his election on February 23, 1958.

== Presidency ==
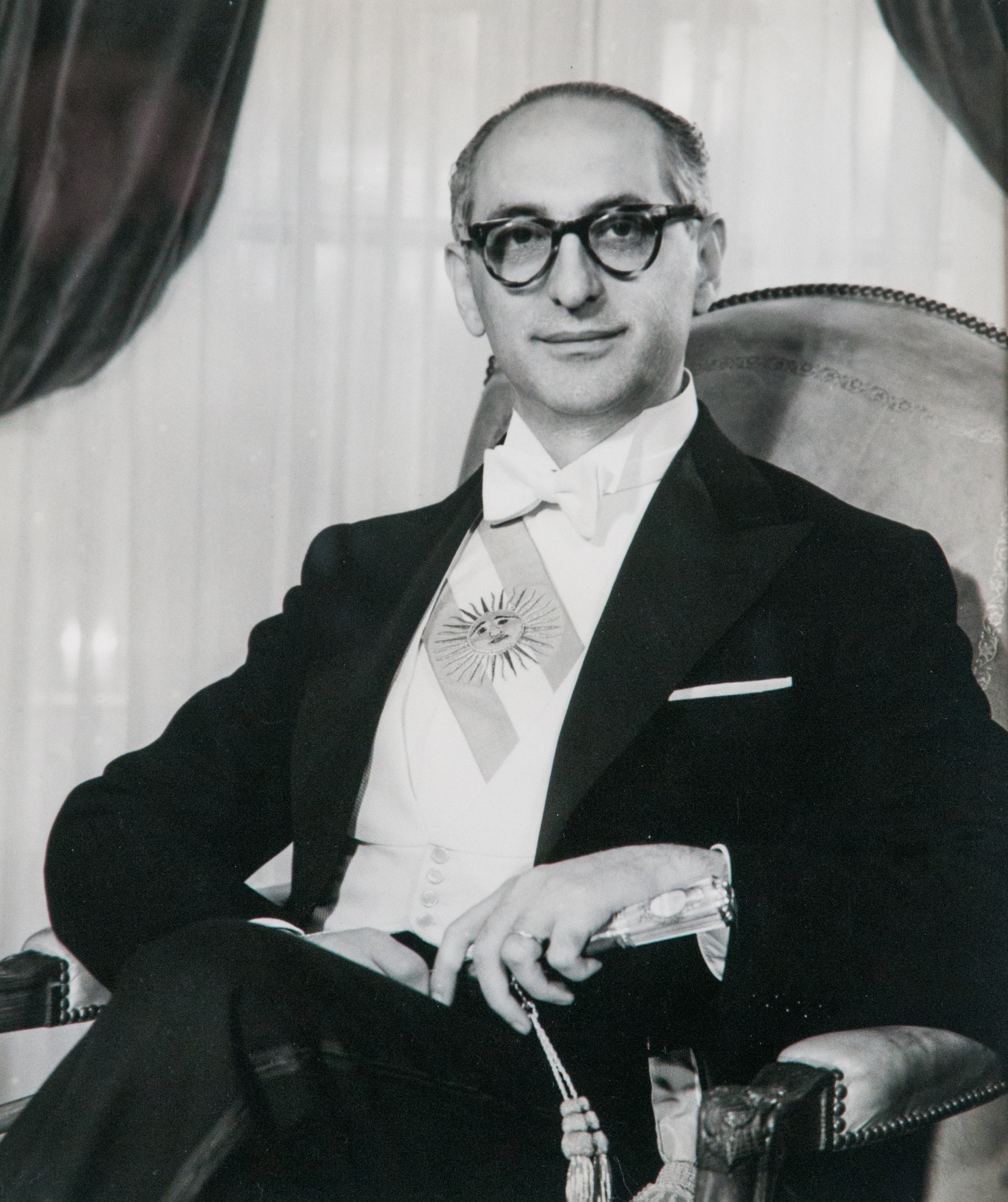
Official photo of former President of Argentina, using the presidential sash.

=== Civil disorder and conflicts with the Armed Forces ===
==== CONINTES ====
Initially, the Frondizi administration repealed several instruments of repression against Peronism and the labor movement. On June 26, 1958 the National Congress repealed Decree Law 4161/56, passed by the dictatorship to ban Peronism, and passed an amnesty law that freed thousands of Peronists and trade unionists imprisoned by the Liberating Revolution. It also repealed the Residence Law No. 4144, passed in 1902, which Argentine trade unions had been denouncing since its very passage. Frondizi also tried to lift the electoral ban on Peronism.

Most Perónists feared being associated with left-wing figures, however, and sided with the military in their opposition to the left. In addition, many Peronists did not recognize the legitimacy of the Frondizi government, and various political and union groups multiplied their sabotage and attacks, even forming a guerrilla group known as Los Uturuncos.

Frondizi also faced constant military interference over much domestic and international policy. Responding to that pressure Frondizi issued secret decree 9880/1958 on November 14, 1958, when facing an oil workers' strike shortly after taking office. The program, known as CONINTES, for "Conmoción Interna del Estado" or "internal shock to the state", was first sketched out during the Perón regime; it allowed the president to declare a state of emergency that suspended a variety of constitutional rights and guarantees and enabled the militarization of society by establishing militarized zones in the main population centers and industrial cities such as La Plata, while authorizing the armed forces to carry out raids and arrests, during which trade unionists and Peronists were interrogated, without complying with constitutional norms. Furthermore, during the state of emergency, strikes and demonstrations were declared illegal.

Because of economic problems in the country and a steep rise in consumer prices, the military forced him to impose harsh austerity measures in 1959, which resulted in more civil unrest. Frondizi declared a national state of emergency in 1960 following a bomb attack by the Peronist resistance on the private home of an Army Captain that killed his daughter. Two days later he issued another decree transferring persons arrested under the CONINTES Plan to the jurisdiction of military tribunals.

When Frondizi met with military leaders following the bomb attack the military called for declaration of martial law, which carried with it the possibility of the death penalty. Lieutenant General Carlos Severo Toranzo Montero told the President: "(...) and with express determination to shoot anyone caught red-handed. Martial law, in this way, will limit terrorism." To avoid this, Frondizi implemented the less severe CONINTES Plan for the second time.

CONINTES gave Fronzini authority to put provincial police forces under the control of the military in order to use the armed forces to repress workers' strikes and protests, student and citizen mobilizations in general, and sabotage and guerrilla actions by emerging leftist guerrilla groups as well as the Peronist resistance. Thousands of people were arrested, and at least 111 were convicted in summary trials conducted by military courts-martial. Tens of thousands of transportation and public service workers were forcibly inducted into military service and placed under the command of the armed forces. Unions were raided, and party-controlled unions were closed down.

During this period, police and prison torture became visibly widespread, to the point that the head of the main opposition bloc of deputies and future Vice President of the Nation, Carlos Perette, stated that "the complaints of torture have assumed unparalleled projections." The levels of repression reached were related to the major strikes of oil, railway, meat, banking, and metal workers, and the large worker-student mobilizations organized by the Argentine University Federation (Federación Universitaria Argentina or "FUA") against private universities known for one of their slogans, "Secular or Free".

Technically the plan ended on August 1, 1961, with the sanction of Decree 6495/1961 that repealed decrees 9880/1958 and 2628/1960. As a replacement for the CONINTES Plan, Frondizi drafted a bill for the Suppression of Terrorist Activities that was approved on July 21, 1960, establishing more severe penalties, after the modification of the Penal Code.

==== The Córdoba Intervention ====
On February 16, 1960, an explosion occurred in the Shell-Mex gasoline depots in the San Fernando neighborhood of Córdoba. The explosion caused the deaths of nine people and injured twenty others. It shocked public opinion, with the main media outlets immediately labeling it a terrorist act.

Three Peronist leaders were arrested, while several union members unrelated to the events were also imprisoned. They were eventually released without trial. The government, for its part, ordered the arrest of the top leaders of Córdoba's Peronist movement and dozens of union leaders, using the repressive powers of the Conintes Plan.

The explosion was used——and, according to some sectors of the UCRI, carried out intentionally——to overthrow the governor of Córdoba, the intransigent radical Arturo Zanichelli, accused by sectors of the Armed Forces of "facilitating Peronist and Marxist infiltration." On May 12, 1960, Army Commander-in-Chief Carlos Toranzo Montero issued a widely reported press statement accusing Zanichelli of complicity in the "attack" and of "organizing and arming terrorist groups." The conservative Democratic Party of Córdoba and the Independent Civic Party——which answered to Minister Álvaro Alsogaray, the military's choice for Minister of the Economy——also held the governor responsible, in line with the military accusation. The Joint Chiefs of Staff of the Armed Forces demanded that President Frondizi assert federal control of the three branches of the province of Córdoba.

Frondizi yielded to military pressure and sent a bill for intervention in the province, which was only approved by the Senate. Without the approval of the Chamber of Deputies, Frondizi finally ordered the federal intervention of Córdoba on June 15, 1960, appointing Juan Francisco de Larrechea, linked to the right-wing minister Alsogaray, as intervener. The faction led by Zanichelli considered it a "new type of coup d'état."

==== The November 30, 1960 Uprising ====
On November 30, 1960, a group of civilians and military personnel, some active and others retired, commanded by General Miguel Ángel Iñíguez, carried out actions in several cities, mainly Rosario and Tartagal, with the aim of overthrowing President Frondizi. That day, an armed group seized the guardhouse of the 11th Infantry Regiment in Rosario. Retired Colonel Julio Barredo Barredo, who commanded the attackers, was killed in the confrontation, while a non-commissioned officer and two conscripts were killed among the defenders. At the same time, a group of soldiers and civilians seized the School Battalion, the city hall, the police station, the railway station, the airport, and the city's two bank branches in Tartagal, Salta province.

A few hours later, members of the National Gendarmerie and other garrisons retook the Rosario barracks after four hours of fighting, while other forces did the same with the occupied facilities in Tartagal. The uprising revived other topics of discussion, including the issue of the legalization of political parties and the elections to be held in February 1961.

=== Petroleum development ===
When Frondizi took office, the Argentine economy was suffering from severe external restrictions caused by a large trade deficit, which prevented it from having the necessary foreign currency to import the inputs needed by the industrial sector. A substantial part of this deficit was due to oil imports; oil production had not grown significantly since Standard Oil was forced out in the 1930s. 60% of the oil consumed by Argentina had to be imported and 80% of all the oil was used to generate electricity), As Argentina relied more on motor vehicles, oil imports drained the country in foreign exchange.

How to achieve increased oil production was a contentious issue by the 1940s. The UCR (Radical Civic Union) favoured a state monopoly, believing it necessary to control the oil reserves. In the Declaration of Avellaneda (a common platform supported by Balbin's UCRP—his wing of the UCR—and Frondizi's UCRI), the state's need to invest in oil exploration and to make Argentina self-sufficient in the short term was expressed as policy.

In 1958, contracts were signed with US oil companies for them to operate on behalf of Yacimientos Petrolíferos Fiscales (YPF). The goal was to achieve self-sufficiency in hydrocarbons and avoid having to purchase them abroad. In three years of management, Argentina achieved a 150% increase in oil and natural gas production. For the first time in history, the country achieved self-sufficiency in oil, and Argentina went from being an oil importer to an exporter. The achievement of self-sufficiency produced a gain of hundreds of millions of dollars in annual crude oil import costs, which helped create almost uninterrupted economic growth over the next thirteen years, especially in industry.

The new oil contracts totaled two hundred million dollars. Thanks to these contracts, oil production tripled in four years. Due to these actions, in September the oil workers' unions declared a general strike in protest of the oil contracts. The president declared a state of siege, imprisoning Peronist unionists; in effect, the Frondizi-Perón pact was broken.

Thirty-six oil drilling rigs had been purchased for the extraction of oil, the largest purchase made in the history of Argentina. In 1960, more than one hundred of these teams were working for the Administration, twice as many as Yacimientos Petrolíferos FiscalesYPF normally had, thus solving the energy crisis that existed around 1958, and ending the "electric diet" and the blackouts that occurred. the country suffered constantly.

While Frondizi encouraged foreign investment in a number of sectors, ten of the 25 largest projects were for exploration of new oil fields. The record public investment in the petrochemical sector led to a fivefold increase in synthetic rubber production; by 1962, the production of crude oil tripled to 16 million cubic meters. Achieving self-sufficiency in oil freed hundreds of millions of dollars in annual import costs for Argentina and helped create 13 years of nearly uninterrupted economic growth, particularly in industry.

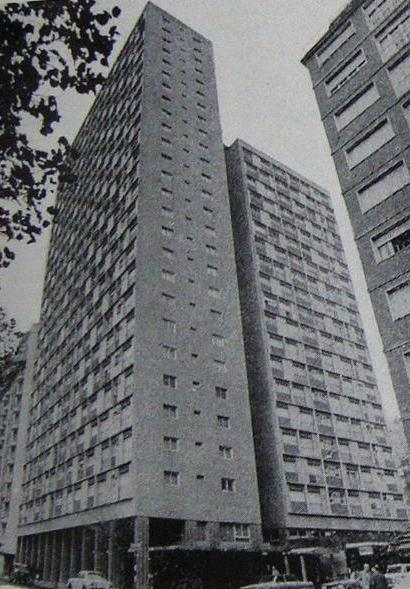
Highrises in Mar del Plata dating from the Frondizi era, when modern architecture came into vogue locally.

=== Industrial policy ===
In addition to the insufficiency in oil production Frondizi also needed to address inadequate steel production, the lack of electricity, and the insufficiency and obsolescence of transport (especially railways). He had inherited economic problems from Perón's 1946-55 administration, characterized by budget deficits because of huge railroad subsidies that cost the treasury a million dollars a day. In addition, Perón had used much of the US$1.7 billion in budget reserves at the time of his election to nationalize the various private railway companies by buying them from French and British interests, then modernizing and expanding them. Critics complained that the railways employed too many workers and produced bloated payrolls that strained national budgets.

Frondizi adopted developmentalism as his basic government policy, based on the recommendations of ECLAC and "dependency theory", originated during the 1950s by intellectuals from all over Latin America. His main collaborators were Rogelio Frigerio, Gabriel del Mazo (one of the fathers of the University Reform), Oscar Alende (governor of the province of Buenos Aires), Roque Vítolo, Rodolfo Martínez, and Carlos Florit.

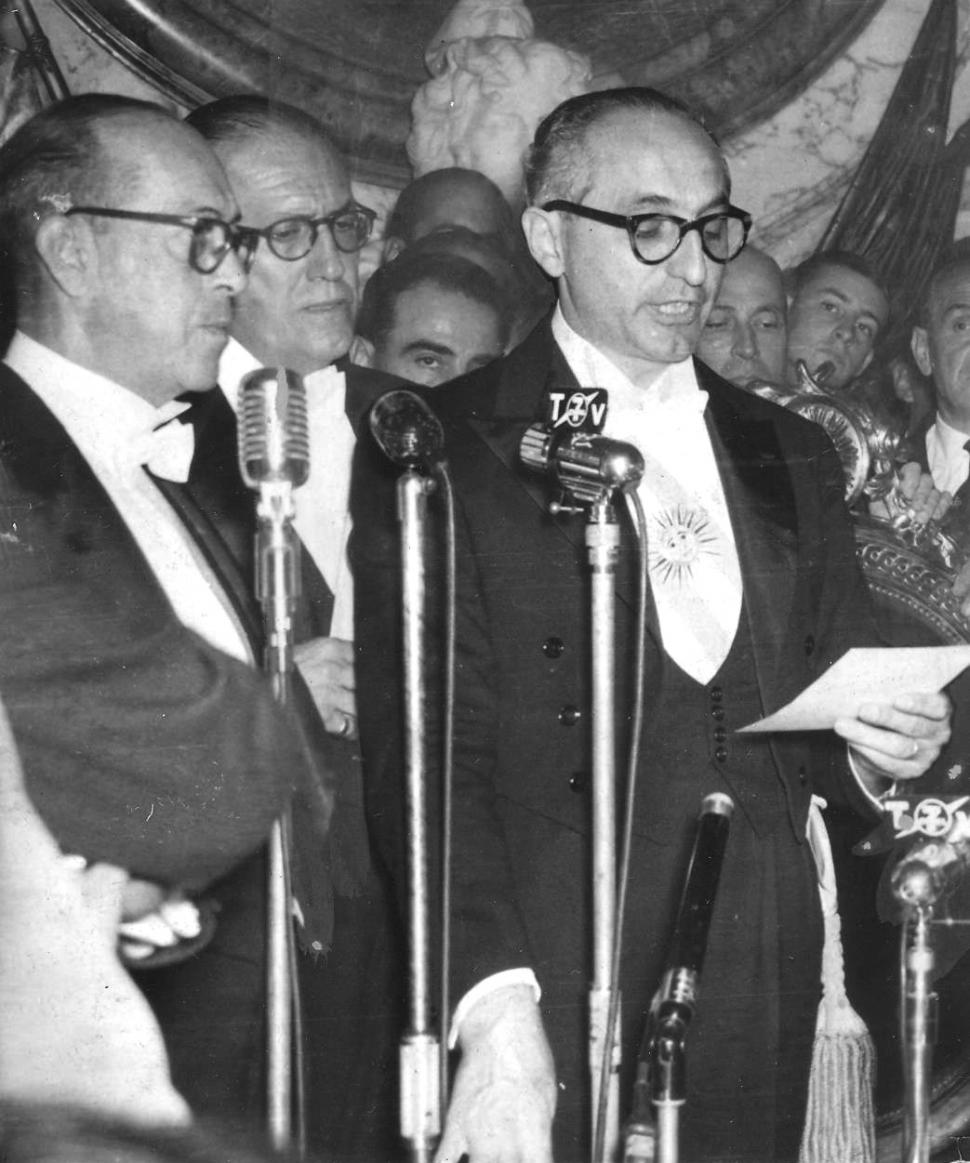
Frondizi giving the first inauguration speech.

However, frondizista developmentalism differed from the ECLAC model by relying mainly on multinational companies, rather than the State, as a driving force behind industrial development. Frondizi began to abandon the position of his book Petroleum and Politics as early as 1956 and concluded that oil contracts with foreign industries could constitute a solution to the energy deficit.

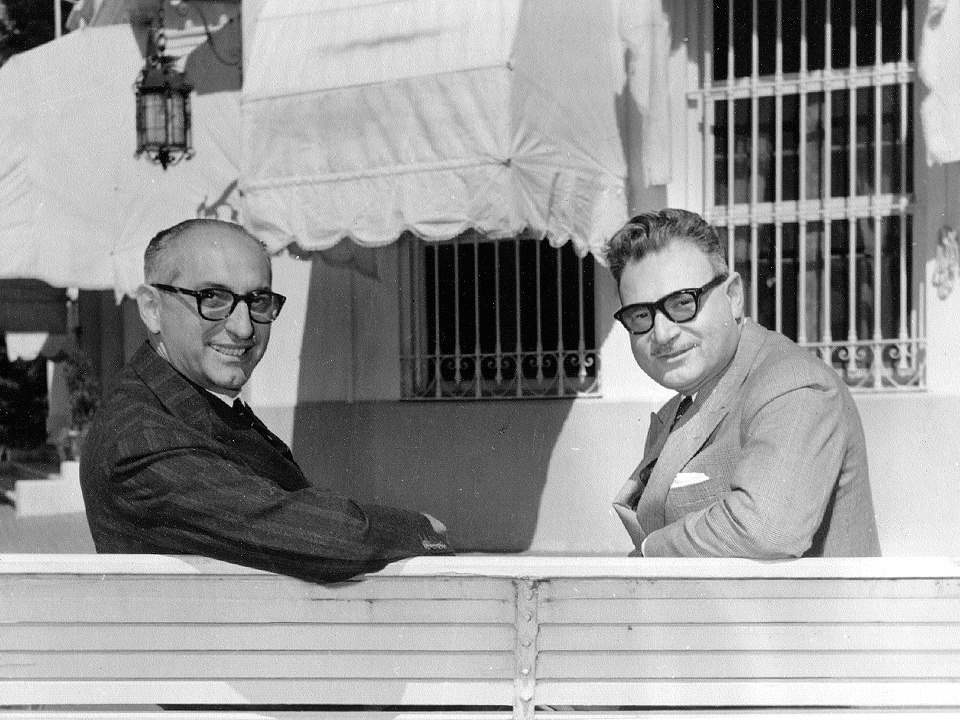
President Arturo Frondizi with secretary Rogelio Julio Frigerio in La Quinta de Olivos, 1958.

Frondizi assigned economist Rogelio Julio Frigerio to develop a bold plan to make Argentina self-sufficient in motor vehicles and petroleum, as well as to quickly extend the country's semi-developed road and electric networks. In the 1950s, these served less than half the population, and fewer than 20% in the poorer north. Frondizi's economic vision was a radical departure from the nationalist one of Perón. To achieve greater investment in industrial development, Frigerio supported passage of the Law of Foreign Investment. This provided foreign corporations with incentives similar to those offered to local ones. It created the Department and Commission of Foreign Investments, which was also designed to give foreign investors more legal recourse when operating in the country.

Inflation would rise as a result of the investments made in 1958 and 1959 (some of them emerging in relation to the energy problem), to the point that it reached 113% annually by early 1959. To combat inflation, the government implemented a 60% salary increase, with the warning that much of this increase would be absorbed by rising inflation, in addition to reducing public spending. Thanks to oil exploitation and increased production, inflation fell to 27.1% in 1960, and to 13.7% in 1961. Until the late 1960s, according to World Bank data, Argentina had a per capita GDP similar to that of Austria, Italy, Japan, and Spain.

Better able to maneuver after the 1959 recession receded, Frondizi began to see results from his economic policies (known as desarrollismo — "developmentalism"). By 1961, he earned the support of much of the country's large middle class.

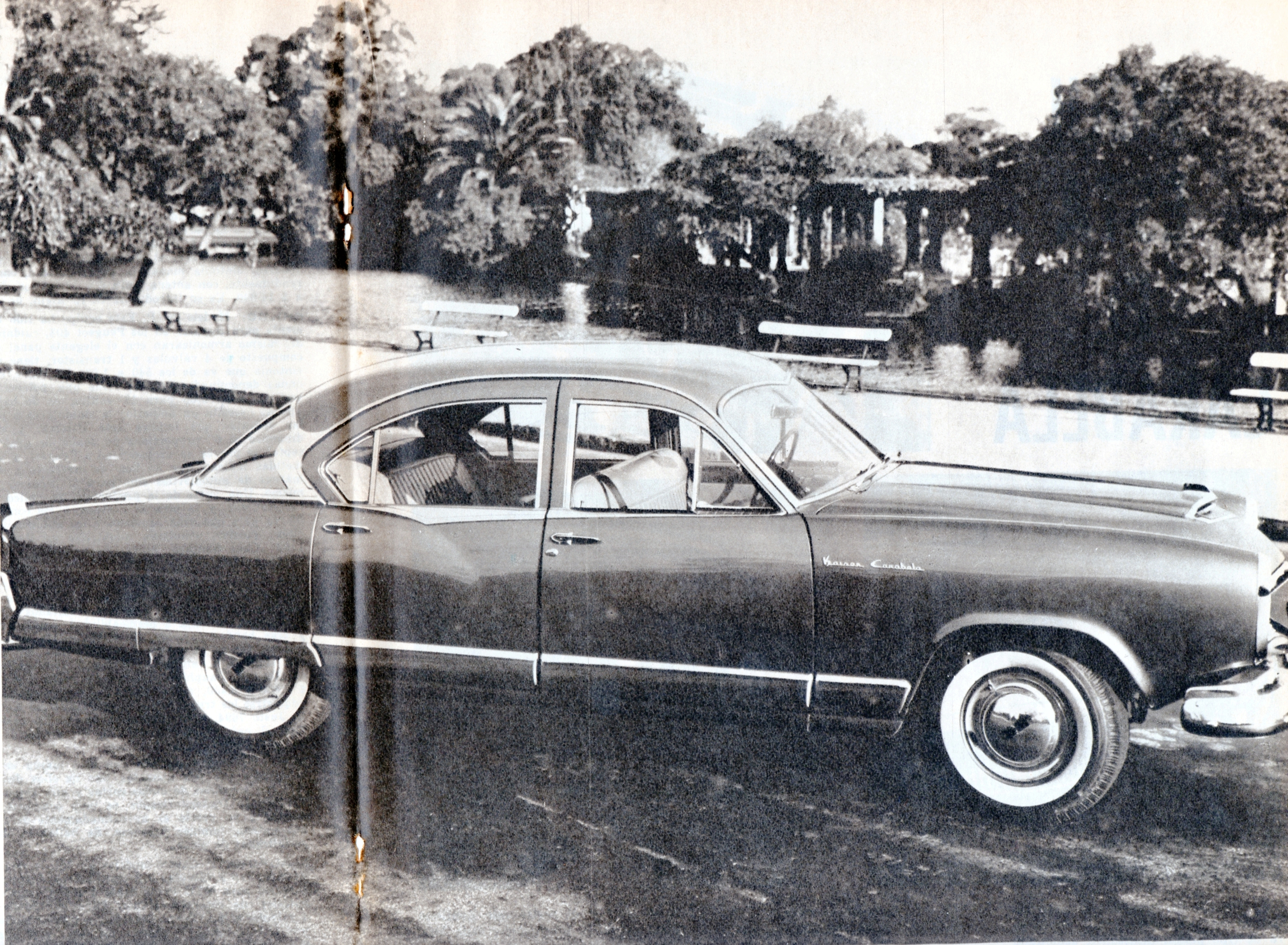
The Kaiser Carabela automobile produced by Industrias Kaiser Argentina and marketed between 1958 and 1962.

Between 1958 and 1963, the historical maximum of foreign investments in Argentina was reached: around 23% of the total for the period between 1912 and 1975. The industrial branches favored in this second stage of the import substitution process were the automotive, the oil and petrochemical, chemical, metallurgical and electrical and non-electrical machinery. Investments were oriented towards taking advantage of the possibilities offered by a protected domestic market.

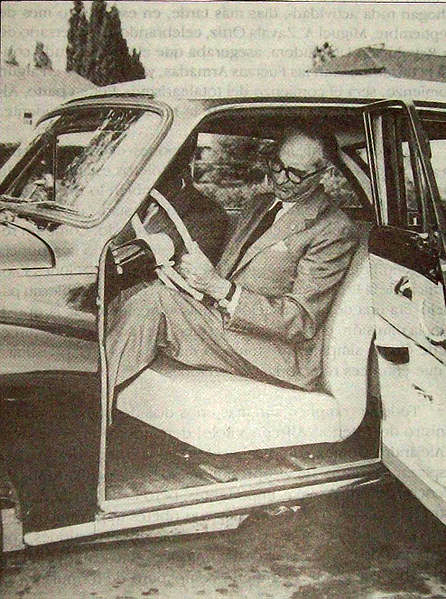
The president testing an Argentina built DKW Auto Union 1000.

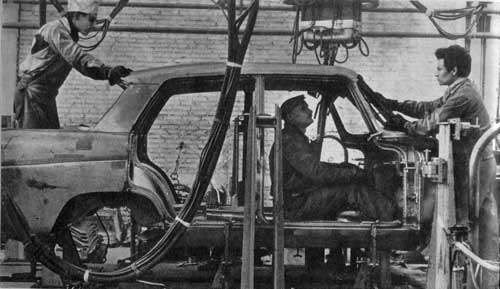
Assembly line of Siam Di Tella 1500 (1959). Several foreign and domestic factories were established and began building automobiles in Argentina.

During those years, foreign investment increased tenfold, as did domestic investment, thus achieving significant industrial modernization. And just as Frondizi had anticipated, the foreign currency reserves previously spent on imported fuel and other raw materials were now allocated to the purchase of industrial equipment, modernizing industry, and basic infrastructure. 90% of all foreign investment during his term went into oil exploration, oil refineries, the auto industry, steel, and household durables.

There was an investment of $140 million in the petrochemical industry between 1959 and 1961. The industry was modernized in 1960 and 1961 with a value of one billion dollars in imported machinery and equipment. Expansion of the steel industry was achieved despite obstacles from the Directorate of Military Manufacturing, which opposed the involvement of private capital. Conicet promoted development in these industries by conducting scientific research that produced improvements in technology and products.

=== Renewable energy ===
The Frondizi administration designed large hydroelectric projects, such as the Chocón and Cerros Colorados hydroelectric dams, to provide the country with clean energy. Servicios Eléctricos del Gran Buenos Aires (or SEGBA by its initials), a public company responsible for the production, distribution, and marketing of electrical energy, was founded. This service was divided and privatized in 1992 by Carlos Menem into three operating entities: EDENOR, EDESUR, and EDELAP.

=== Agriculture ===
Although the Frondizi government's policy had focused primarily on the development of the country's industrial activity, it did not neglect the agricultural sector, which represented an important source of foreign currency for the Argentine economy at the time. Thus, thanks to the development of the steel and petrochemical industries, which promoted technological advancement and the provision of necessary machinery, fertilizers, and pesticides, national agricultural production increased. INTA promoted rigorous scientific research in this field in accordance with national standards.

Three factors played a key role in this entire process: the greater availability of credit at viable rates; greater tax breaks; and the participation of private capital. To give an example of all this, in 1957, before Frondizi assumed the presidency, 6,000 tractors were sold in Argentina. In the last year of his term, annual tractor sales rose to 20,000 units, a result of the growth of the agricultural sector.

There was also progress in the agricultural sector, starting with the development of the steel and petrochemical industries, which promoted the modernization and provision of fertilizers, pesticides and machinery, thus increasing agricultural production and productivity.

=== Aerospace ===
El presidente felicita al comodoro Aldo Zeoli por el exitoso lanzamiento del cohete Alfa Centauro. The President congratulates Commodore Aldo Zeoli on the successful launch of the Alfa Centauro rocket. Since the first administration of Juan Domingo Perón, various types of propellants had been tested for launching rockets manufactured entirely in Argentina. However, throughout the 1950s, these activities stagnated. Beginning with the Frondizi administration, experiments resumed, first developing solid-propellant engines in December 1959. Decree No. 1164 of January 28, 1960 established the CNIE, the first organization responsible for rocket crews. Engineer Teófilo Tabanera was appointed president, and on June 27, 1961, the Executive Branch created the Center for Experimentation and Launching of Self-Propelled Projectiles (CELPA).[130][131]

The first launch of an aircraft built entirely in Argentina took place on February 2, 1961, when the APEX A1-02 Alfa Centauro took off from the town of Santo Tomás, in Pampa de Achala (Córdoba province).

=== Labor policy ===
Union elections were held in 1957, with Peronists winning most of them. The unions had been grouped into three groups: the 62 Organizations (Peronists), the 32 Democratic Guilds (socialists and radicals) and the MUCS (communists).

In 1958, Law No. 14,499 provided that retirees would automatically receive an equivalent of 82% of what they received when they worked.

In October 1960, Peronist and independent unions formed the Commission of 20 to demand the return of the General Labor Confederation (CGT), which had been under government control since the 1955 military coup. To pressure the government, the Commission of 20 declared a general strike on November 7, forcing President Frondizi to receive them and finally agree on March 3, 1961, to return the CGT to the Commission of the 20.

During the Frondizi administration, the new Trade Union Law No. 14,455 was passed, establishing the freedom to create unions through simple registration and designating the most representative of all as the recognized unions, with the aim of unifying worker representation before employers, the government, and international organizations. The law also established recognition of elected delegates as union representatives in the workplace and prohibited their dismissal without judicial authorization.

In 1961, the railway union La Fraternidad filed a complaint against the Argentine government with the International Labour Organization (ILO) for violating its and its members' freedom of association. The ILO's Committee on Freedom of Association upheld the union complaint, recommending that the organization draw the Frondizi government's attention to its obligation to respect the agreements reached with the unions.

=== Educational policy ===
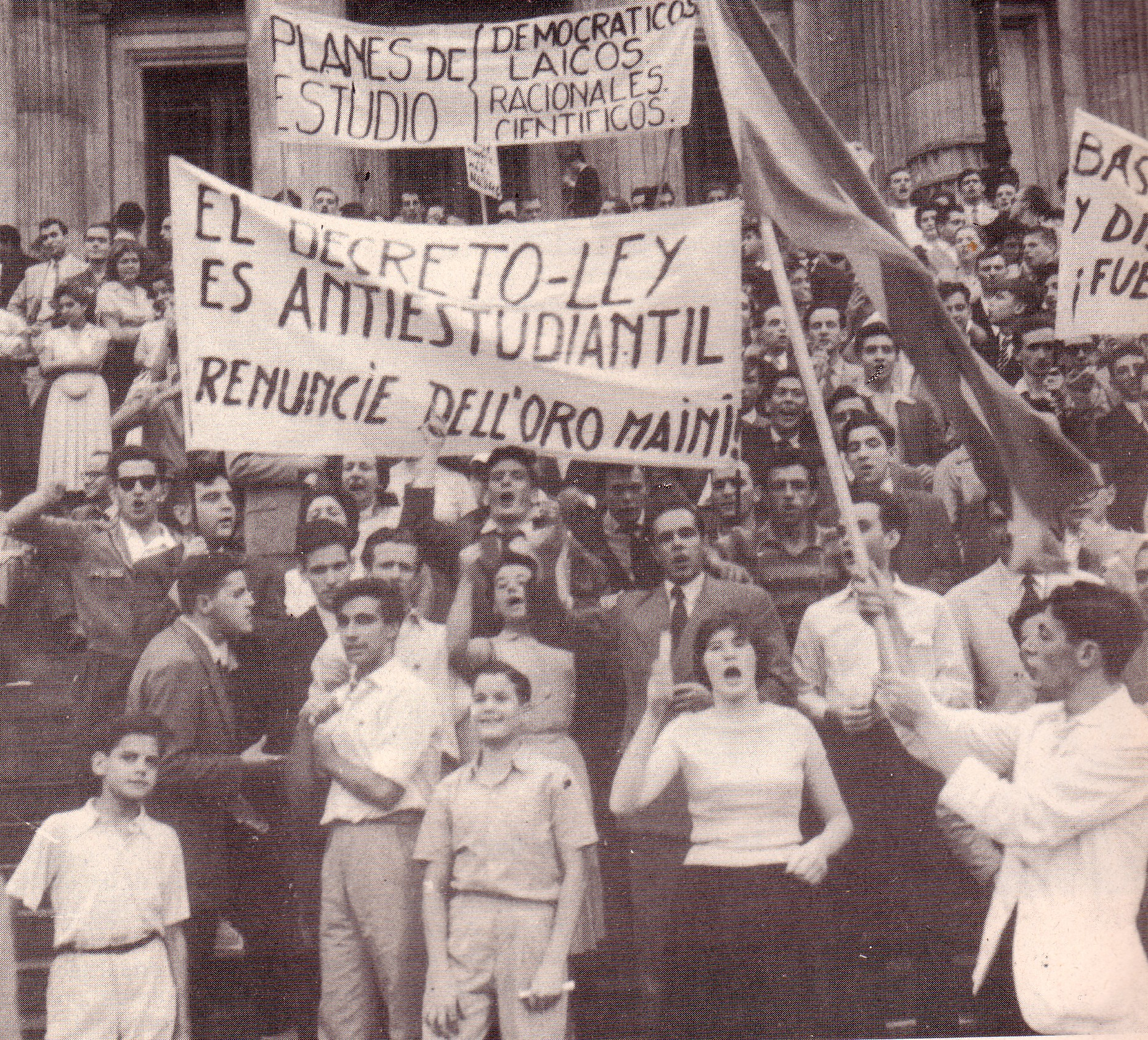
Worker-student mobilization. Buenos Aires 1959.

In addition to industrialization, there was also room for education: technical schools multiplied, ushering in a decade (1963-1974) in which Argentina would record the highest growth rates in the world and significantly reduce poverty. As a demonstration of the importance of science and technology, during his administration, he encouraged the INTI (National Institute of Technical Education), the INTA (National Institute of Technical Education), the National Council of Technical Education (CONET), with state, employer, and union representation, and the CONICET (National Institute of Technology and Communications), chaired by Nobel Prize winner Bernardo Houssay.

Frondizi, however, advanced other educational reforms to dovetail with his economic policy. His administration renamed the National Workers' University (a technical school inaugurated by Perón in 1948) as the National Technological University, which acquired new autonomy through the passage of Law 14,855 of October 14, 1959. He proceeded to incorporate the National Workers' University network of campuses (technical schools inaugurated by Perón in 1948) under the national university aegis, by which he established the UTN system in 1959, and opened numerous new campuses. The UTN became the leading alma mater for Argentine engineers in subsequent decades.

Frondizi's educational policy was characterized by the passage of two major laws: the Teachers' Statute and the law that authorized private universities to issue professional degrees. The latter led to a large student protest known as "Secular or Free."

Just as the debates surrounding the oil dispute reached their peak, a new problem originating from the Liberating Revolution arose: the regulation of Decree 6403/55, which had been promoted by the Minister of Education, Atilio Dell'Oro Maini (a conservative Catholic). This decree authorized the operation of private universities. However, at the end of August 1958, the government sought to enforce Article 28, thus allowing private universities (although some did not exist, but were planned) to issue qualifying degrees. Many of these new universities were Catholic.

The debate over state support for parochial education had deep historical roots. Following the university reform of 1918, Argentine education, especially at university level, became more independent of the government, as well as the influential Catholic Church. The church began to re-emerge in the country's secular educational system during Perón's rule, when catechism was reintroduced in public schools, and parochial institutions began receiving subsidies. A sudden reversal in the policy in 1954 helped lead to Perón's violent overthrow, however, after which his earlier, pro-clerical policies were reinstated by his successor, Pedro Eugenio Aramburu.

Frondizi initially opposed Aramburu's Law 6403 of 1955, which advanced private education generally, and parochial Catholic-run schools staffed with lay teachers in particular. Confident the new policy would be upheld, church supporters founded the Argentine Catholic University. The UCRI campaigned against the policy, though when Frondizi took office, he shifted in favor of further, pro-clerical reforms, which he then referred to as "free education." Opposed by many in his own party, and especially by the President of the University of Buenos Aires (his brother, Risieri), Frondizi was open about his motivation for the policy change, declaring that "I need the support of the church."

The student movement organized in the Argentine University Federation (FUA) immediately opposed the authorization of private universities and organized a plan of mobilizations with the support of unions, high school students, and opposition political parties, under the slogan "Secular or Free," one of the largest mobilizations in the history of the Argentine student movement. Among the student leaders, Guillermo Estévez Boero, president of the Mobilization Committee, who in 1989 would be elected national deputy for the Socialist Party, stood out. The students defended the banner of "secular education" (opposed to the Frondizi bill), while the government and the Catholic Church defended the banner of "free education."

On August 28, 1958, the seven rectors of the seven national universities (among them José Peco, Josué Gollán, Oberdán Caletti, and the brother of the President, Risieri Frondizi) asked the National Executive Branch not to approve the decree for private universities, arguing that it was "so that the institutional and academic life of the country would not be altered." Demonstrations and protests began almost simultaneously, first taking place inside the schools and later moving to the streets. For the laity, Frondizi was an instrument of the Church: they even burned an effigy of the president whose figure was represented dressed (according to the historian Félix Luna) in a grotesque clerical cassock.

The Educational Freedom Law, signed in early 1959, also freed private universities from limits imposed by the 1885 Avellaneda Law, under which they could not issue official degrees directly, but only through a public university. The law led to controversy because most of the new universities and private schools, which would become eligible for state subsidies, were religious. Supporters applauded Frondizi's vision of private universities that could co-exist with public ones, and it was seen as a progressive measure. Those in favour of a strictly secular educational system believed, however, the law to be a concession given to the Church in exchange for support and became disillusioned with the pragmatic Frondizi.

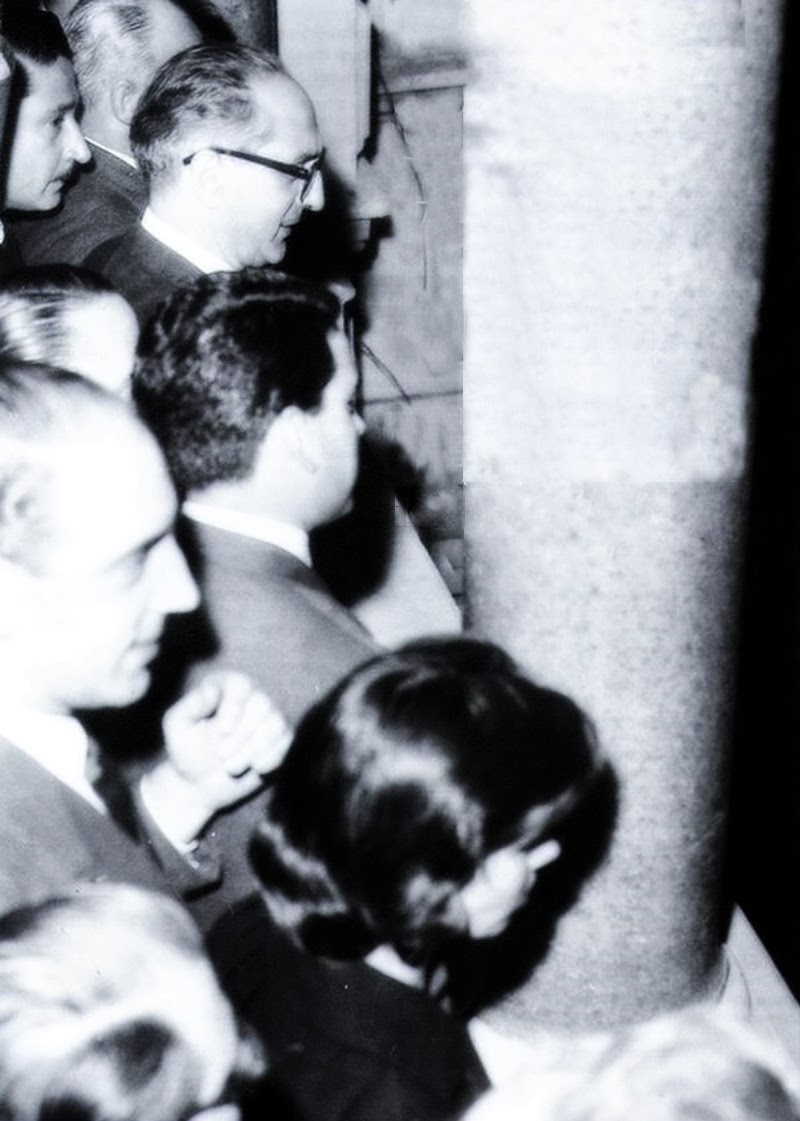
Frondizi observes the student protests from the balcony of the pink house, with their slogans "Secular or free."

=== Cultural ferment ===
The opening to the world also took place in the cultural field, when certain cultural expressions that had been buried under Peronism flourished during the Frondizist period. Universities adopted new disciplines such as sociology and psychology and those subjects surfaced in cinema, as in the films of Leopoldo Torre Nilsson and Fernando Ayala, while independent theater popularized great contemporary authors, and the Torcuato di Tella Institute, created on July 22, 1958, began to disseminate the artistic avant-garde works that the State promoted through the National Arts Fund.

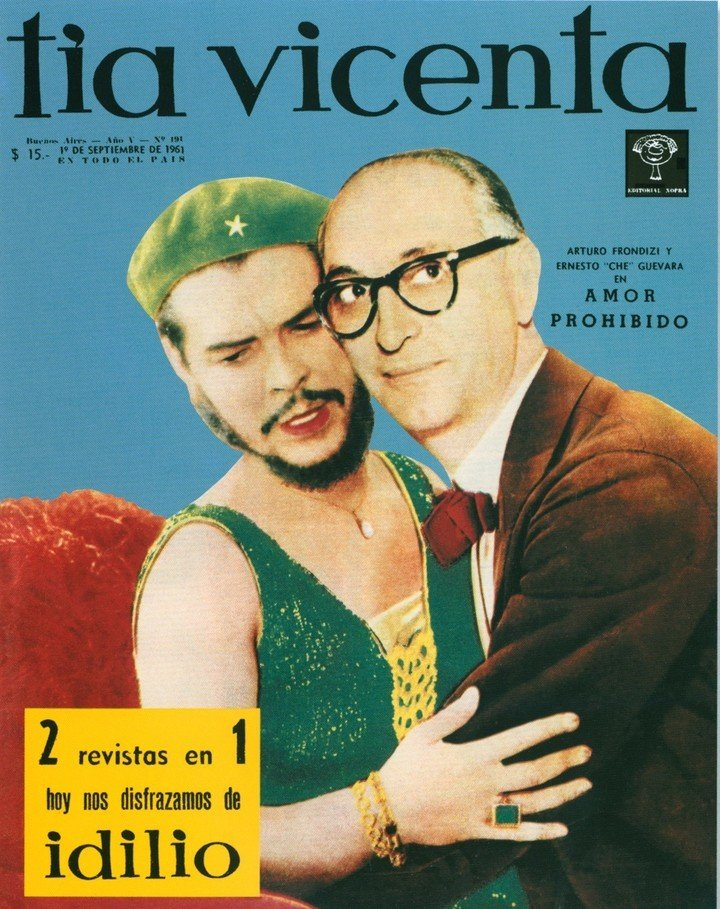
Cover featuring Che Guevara and president Arturo Frondizi, September 1961.

Technological advances revolutionized popular entertainment media: one of the most notable was the Spika portable radio, which made it possible for people to instantly follow the exploits of the country's greatest athletes, such as race car driver Juan Manuel Fangio. Qué! magazine developed the American magazine format in Argentina; and the satirical weekly Tía Vicenta revolutionized graphic humor in the country. Its creator, Juan Carlos Colombres ("Landrú"), was the first scriptwriter for Tato Bores, who introduced political humor to Argentine television.

On the other hand, the Frondizi administration began systematic morality campaigns with raids and persecutions of homosexuals and transvestites, led by Commissioner Luis Margaride. Due to the enforcement of police edicts, between 110,000 and 170,000 people were arrested each year in the Federal Capital alone.

=== Foreign policy ===
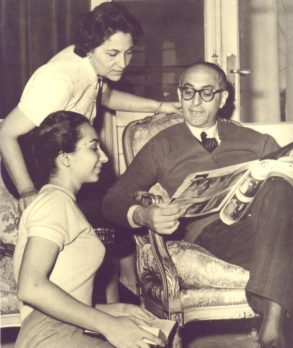
The Frondizis in 1960.

Frondizi strove to maintain good relations with foreign countries, while shaping foreign policy to serve a national strategy of economic development and integration, balancing economic competition with a policy favoring peaceful coexistence. Throughout the years of the Cold War and the era of decolonization he sought to avoid conflicts within the blocs.

==== Relations with the Soviet Union ====
For the first time in Argentine history, Argentina entered into economic agreements with the Soviet Union. Initially, the Frondizi government was well-regarded in the Soviet Union. The Deputy Chairman of the Presidium of the Supreme Soviet of the Soviet Union, Mikhail Tarasov, attended Frondizi's inauguration and met with him. Frondizi sent a diplomatic mission headed by José V. Liceaga to the Soviet Union, where they negotiated a loan of $100,000,000 for the acquisition of oil extraction equipment.

However, following the economic and social crisis of 1959, some members of the Soviet embassy were expelled, accused of participating in some of the events, a claim denied by Ambassador Kostylev. In this climate, on April 27, the government banned the Communist Party and also terminated the purchase of oil equipment from the Soviet Union, after only a third of the loan had been used.

==== Relations with other Latin American nations ====
While Arturo Frondizi formed his cabinet, he planned a tour of countries in Latin America, with the purpose of promoting bilateral relations. Between April 7–17, 1958, Frondizi toured the cities of Montevideo, Rio de Janeiro, São Paulo, Santiago and Lima.

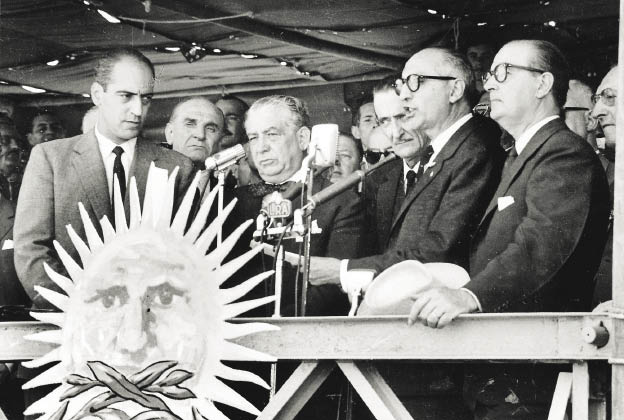
Frondizi with the Uruguayan president, Eduardo Víctor Haedo.

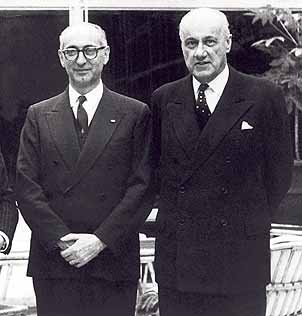
Arturo Frondizi during a visit to Chile in 1961 is received by President Jorge Alessandri.

After the Snipe islet incident in the Beagle Channel, the governments of Argentina and Chile made efforts to resolve their border problems. On February 2, 1959, Frondizi landed at Los Cerrillos Airport and signed, together with his Chilean counterpart Jorge Alessandri, the Joint Declaration on Arbitration in which both leaders agreed to "immediately enter into negotiations aimed at finding the right formulas appropriate arbitrations, which allow the resolution of existing disputes ". The two presidents had agreed to submit the border dispute in the area of the Encuentro river and the valleys of Palena and California to arbitration by the British government (or in its absence the president of the Swiss Confederation), while the Beagle dispute would be submitted to the International Court of Justice in The Hague.

A series of diplomatic protocols were signed with Chile in 1960, one of the protocols submitted the Paleina issue to arbitration, another was the Beagle Protocol, in addition to two Agreements: one for navigation through the southern channels and another for permanent arbitration.

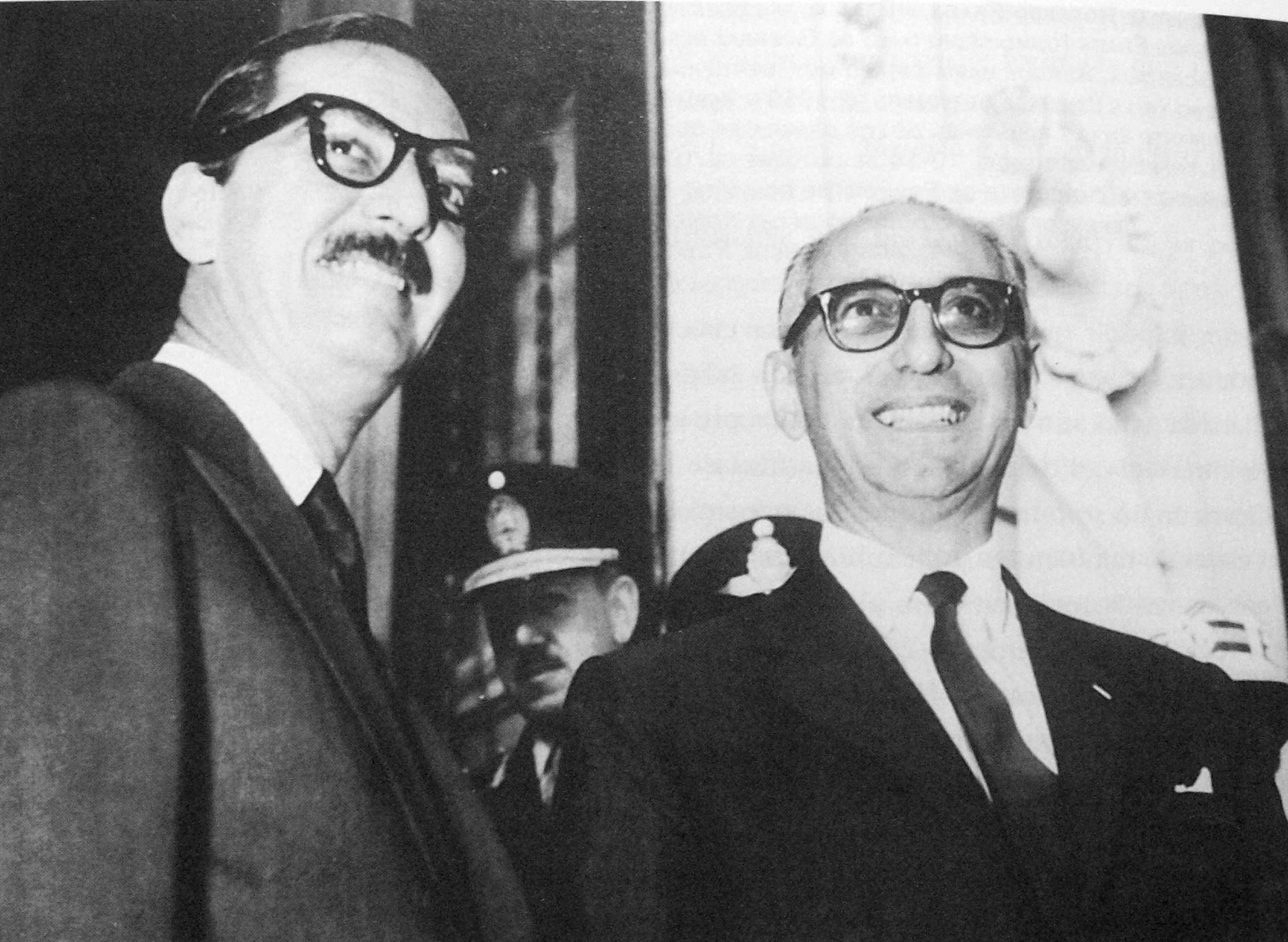
Janio Quadros and Arturo Frondizi.

Presidents Frondizi and Alessandri met in Santiago de Chile, where they made a Declaration on the "agreement that contains all the bases for the peaceful solution of pending boundary issues within the two countries" except Antarctica. It was in this agreement that the dispute in the Beagle Channel was intended to be submitted to the decision of the Inter-American Court of Justice in The Hague. On June 12, 1960, they met in Buenos Aires the ambassadors of both countries to sign what became known as the Beagle Protocol and the Navigation Protocol, which allowed, among other things, the passage of Argentine warships through the channel and the Strait of Magellan, in addition, the treaty established limits precise, as for example, a border line that would run along the middle line of the canal leaving the canal divided for both countries. But the treaty like the Navigation Agreement were rejected by the congresses of both nations.

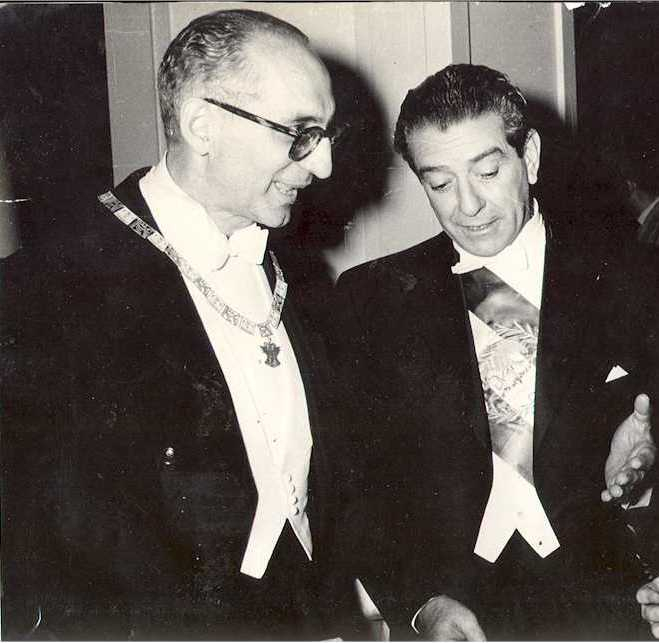
Arturo Frondizi with Adolfo López Mateos.

Throughout his entire government, Frondizi had meetings with Latin American figures such as Juscelino Kubitschek, Jânio Quadros, Jorge Alessandri, Manuel Prado Ugarteche, Adolfo López Mateos, Víctor Paz Estenssoro, among others.

==== Relations with Europe ====
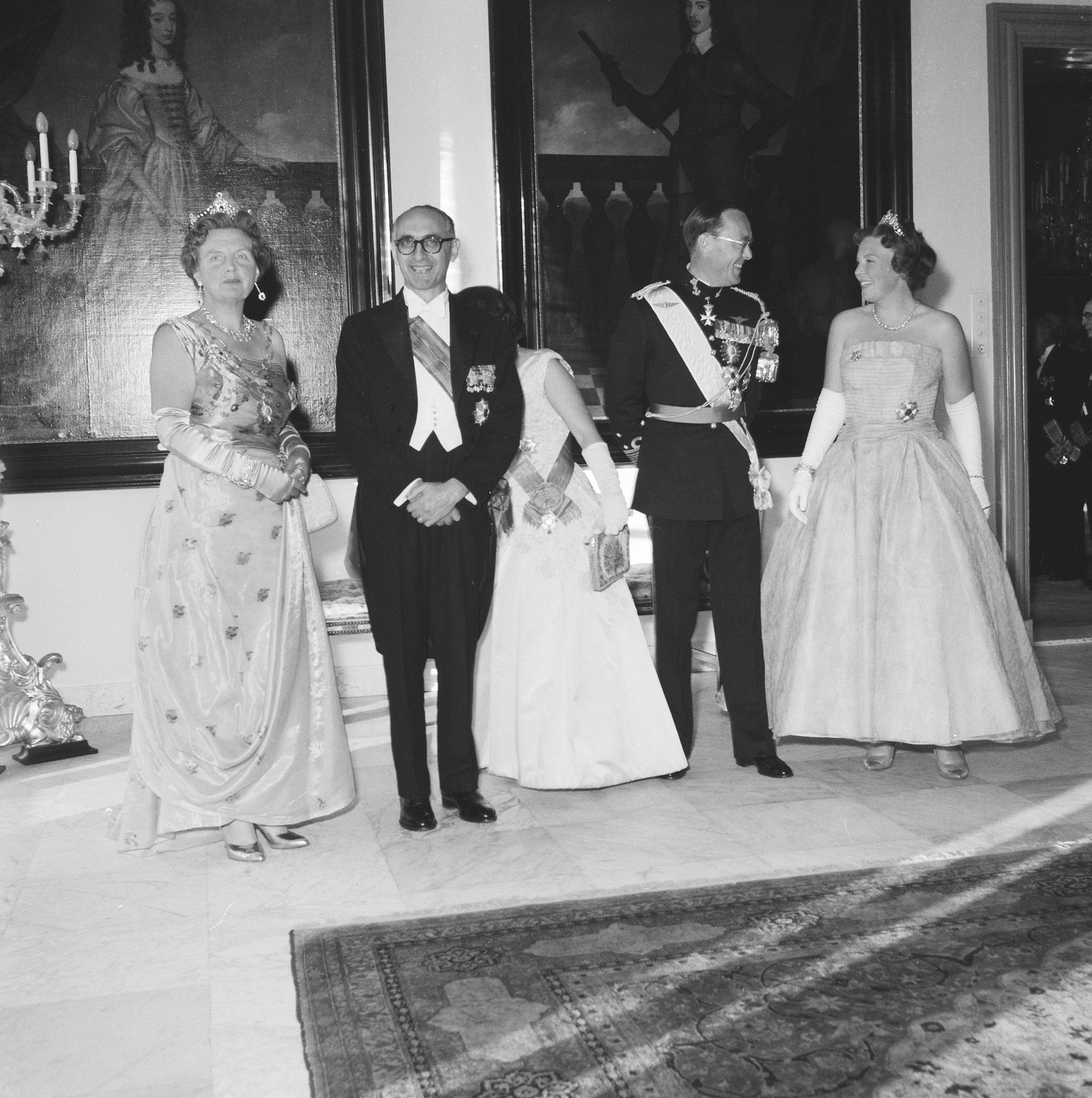
Frondizi with the queen of the Netherlands.

Throughout the year 1960, President Frondizi carried out a European tour in which he visited Italy, The Vatican, Switzerland, France, Belgium, Germany, Holland, Great Britain and Spain.

Frondizi arrived in Rome, where he was received by the President of the Italian Republic Giovanni Gronchi. The Argentine president stayed briefly in Gubbio, the city of his ancestors and visited John XXIII in a private audience that, later, was shared by other members of the Argentine delegation. The Pope stated that the Argentine, born Catholic, sought to bring to the world a message of peace in which the values of the spirit will illuminate understanding among men.

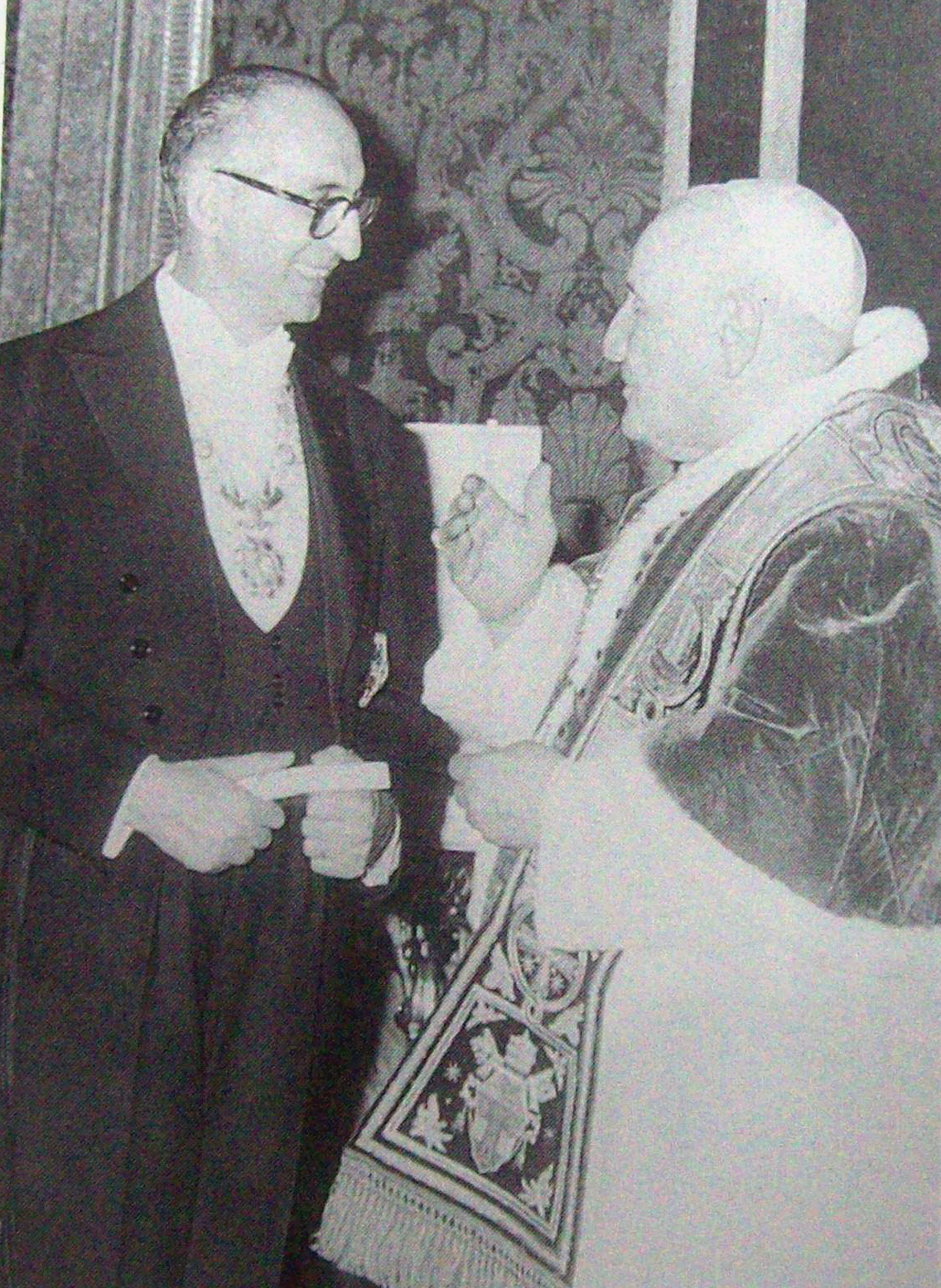
Arturo Frondizi with John XXIII.

Frondizi then visited Bern. Although the Swiss country did not maintain significant trade with Argentina, he used the opportunity to establish relations with Swiss industrialists. The Argentine president was received by Max Petitpierre, president of the Confederación, who hailed him as "the rebuilder of the economic stability of Argentina, the new liberal line that you adopted for the new Argentine economy has won the sympathy and trust of our authorities and those who support commercial relations with your country".

Frondizi next arrived in France with knowledge of the disagreement between the two countries in the United Nations Assembly on Algeria. In Frondizi's first meeting with de Gaulle, de Gaulle received him with his hand raised and a question: "How has your country voted in the United Nations against France?" Frondizi responded: "My country cannot stop showing solidarity with the peoples who fight for their self-determination" and added "we learned it from the influence of the French Revolution".

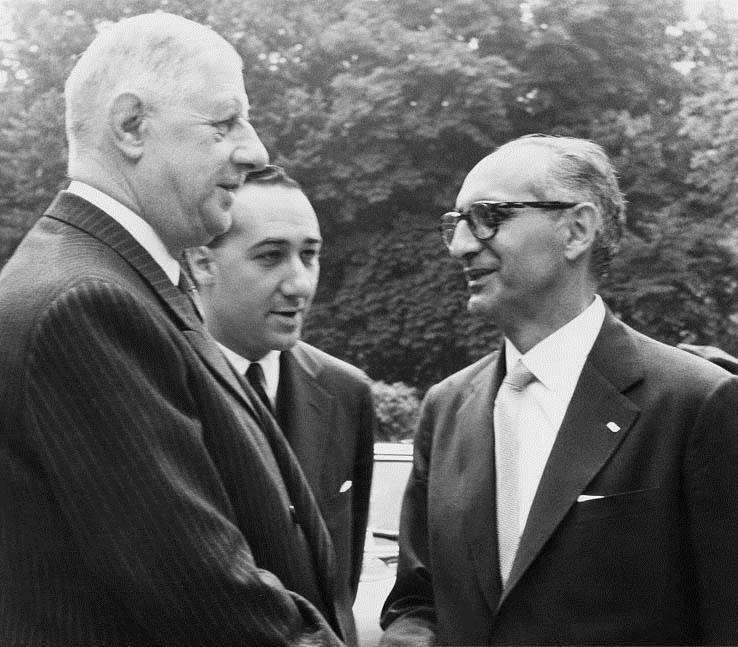
Charles de Gaulle with Arturo Frondizi.

The Argentine president arrived in Brussels, where he received a "warm reception" from Belgium, which ranked third in European exports to Argentina. The Argentine president visited the port of Antwerp and took the opportunity to make contact with businessmen and authorities of the Chamber of Commerce of that city. Jacques van Offelen, Minister of Foreign Trade, was present at the press meeting given by the Argentine president. In his speeches he noted that José de San Martín had lived in Belgium during his years of exile.

Frondizi exalted the German contributions to universal culture in Bonn and Bad Godesberg, Beethovenian cities. He also visited Cologne, where he met with businessmen, and Essen, a city in North Rhine-Westphalia located in the heart of the industrial region of the Ruhr basin, center of the German steel industry. The Argentine president was received by Konrad Adenauer, who was accompanied by his finance minister Ludwig Erhard. At the meal offered by Chancellor Adenauer to Frondizi, he called him "a friend of our country" and praised the skill with which he kept the helm: "we continue with interest in the development of Latin America".

The Argentine president arrived in Amsterdam, where he was received by members of the royal family, Queen Juliana and Prince Bernhard. The Dutch press had greeted to the president who came with favorable headlines. Queen Juliana entertained Frondizi with a meal in which she recalled the cordiality with which Prince Bernhard had been received on the occasion of attending the commemoration of the 150th anniversary of the declaration of Argentine independence. He stressed: "isolation is no longer of our era."

Frondizi arrived in the United Kingdom, in a trip that aroused great expectations. Upon his arrival he was received by the Prime Minister English Harold Macmillan; complied with the protocol for visiting Queen Elizabeth II, the imposition of the decorations and, immediately afterwards, a meeting awaited him press at the Argentine embassy. In the two interviews with Macmillan, the Argentine president expressed his hope that Britain would use its influence to channel investment into Argentina. The Argentine president raised the possibility that Argentina could be part of

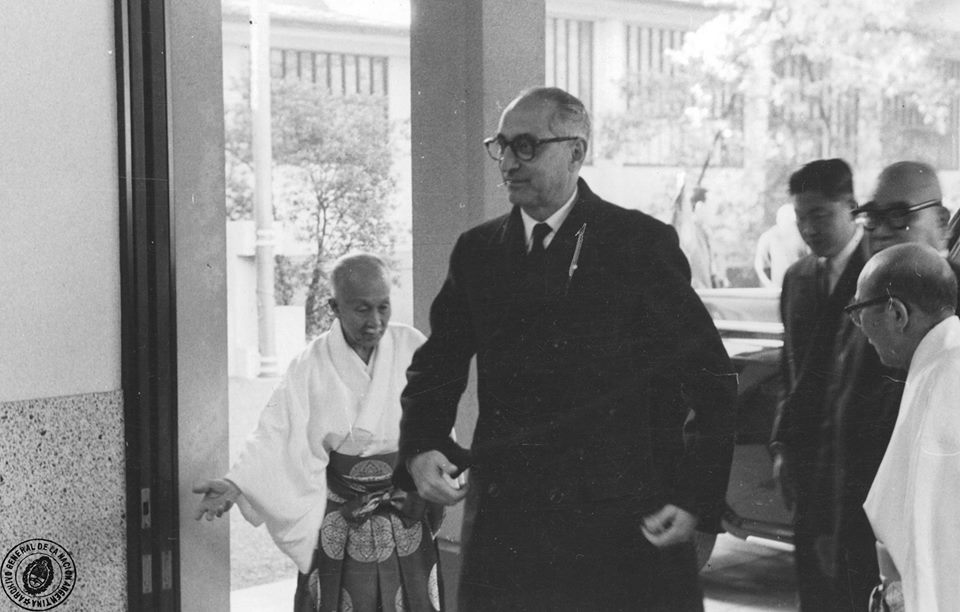
Arturo Frondizi in Kyoto, Japan.

the Organization for European Economic Co-operation or, at least, an observer, since Latin America must have its voice in it.

Spain could not be absent from the European tour of the Argentine president, who was hailed as "professor of humanism." He was received by General Francisco Franco, remembering the community of language, religion and culture that united both peoples. In the official interview, Frondizi was awarded the Orden de Isabel la Católica and, in turn, presented Franco with the Orden del Libertador San Martín. The two leaders met behind closed doors.

==== Relations with the United States and Cuba ====
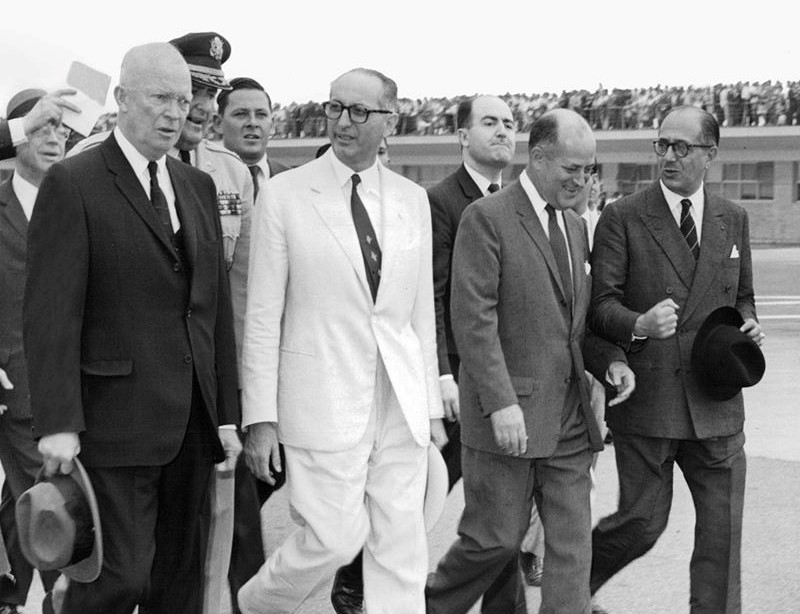
Frondizi and Eisenhower in Ezeiza.

Frondizi was the first Argentine president to make an official visit to the United States. He was there from January 19 to February 1, 1959. Frondizi met with Eisenhower on January 22 at the White House.

The Argentine President would once again highlight the achievements of having been in office for a year, and reiterated that Argentina would need credits for hydroelectric power and producing steel. When he mentioned the Peruvian-Ecuadorian border conflict, everyone present agreed that the solution to the conflict would be of great importance for the entire continent. Eisenhower then told Frondizi that members of his administration were watching the progress made in Argentina, and they admired the president's courage and leadership.

Eisenhower visited Argentina in February 1960. Both leaders issued the "Declaration of Bariloche", a pledge of friendship between Argentina and the United States that committed both to economic development of the Americas and support for democratic governance.

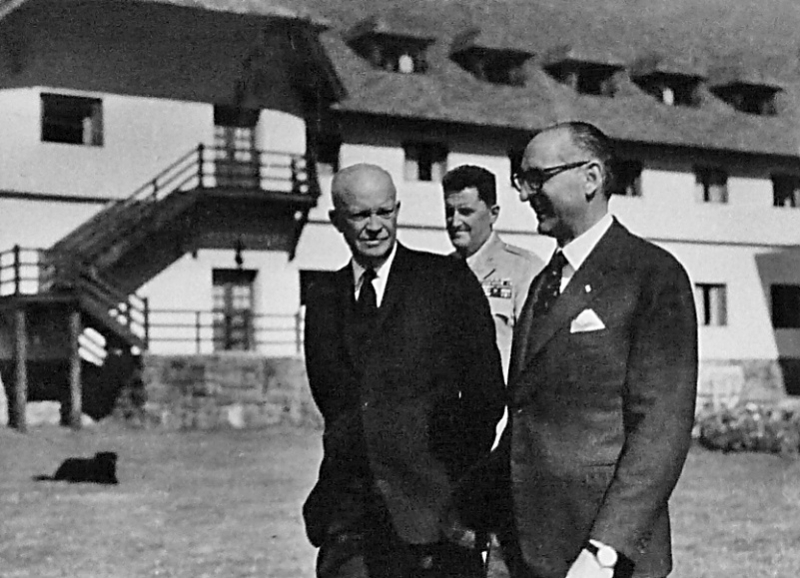
in Bariloche.

During a speech before the OAS Frondizi denounced the deterioration of the terms of trade in the region and supported "Operation Pan-America", a version of the Marshall Plan for Latin America proposed by Brazilian President Juscelino Kubitschek, whose goal was the development and formation of capital in Latin America. The Kennedy Administration later cited Operation Pan-America as inspiration for the Alliance for Progress.

Four months after the victory of the Cuban Revolution in 1959, Cuba was still part of the Organization of American States (OAS). The island had not yet declared itself a socialist state and Fidel Castro was even viewed sympathetically by some sectors that would later revile him. On May 1, Castro arrived at the Ezeiza Airport; Admiral Hermes Quijada welcomed him on behalf of President Frondizi. Castro gave a famous ninety-minute speech the following day before the OAS in which Castro praised the American democracy, which had welcomed Latin American immigrants.

Frondizi and John F. Kennedy came to have a good personal relationship and even mutual consultation on international issues. Although both had similar positions politically and economically, they disagreed on certain aspects of security in the hemisphere. On the one hand, Frondizi was in broad agreement with Kennedy's Alliance for Progress, which was intended both to foster economic development and democratic change in Latin America and to counter Cuban influence. However, Kennedy's administration security policy was at odds with the foreign policy of the Frondizi government, which promoted the principle of non-intervention and the right of self-determination of the peoples. During the OAS meeting in Punta del Este in January 1961, Argentine Foreign Minister Miguel Ángel Cárcano opposed the exclusion of Cuba from the inter-American system.

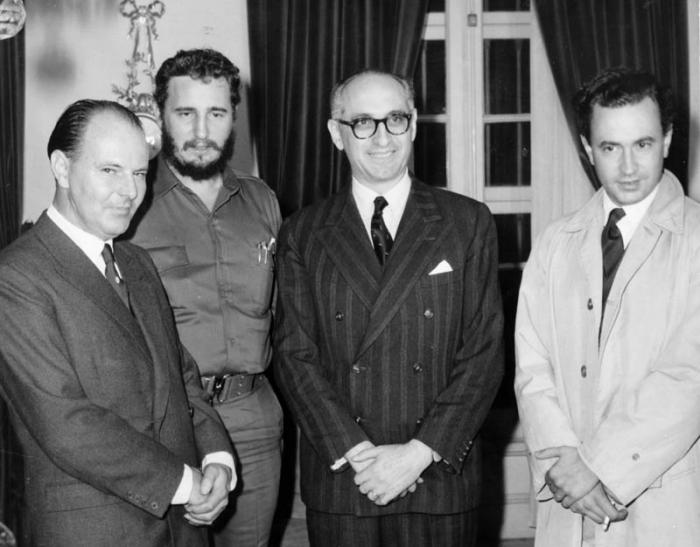
Frondizi and Fidel Castro.

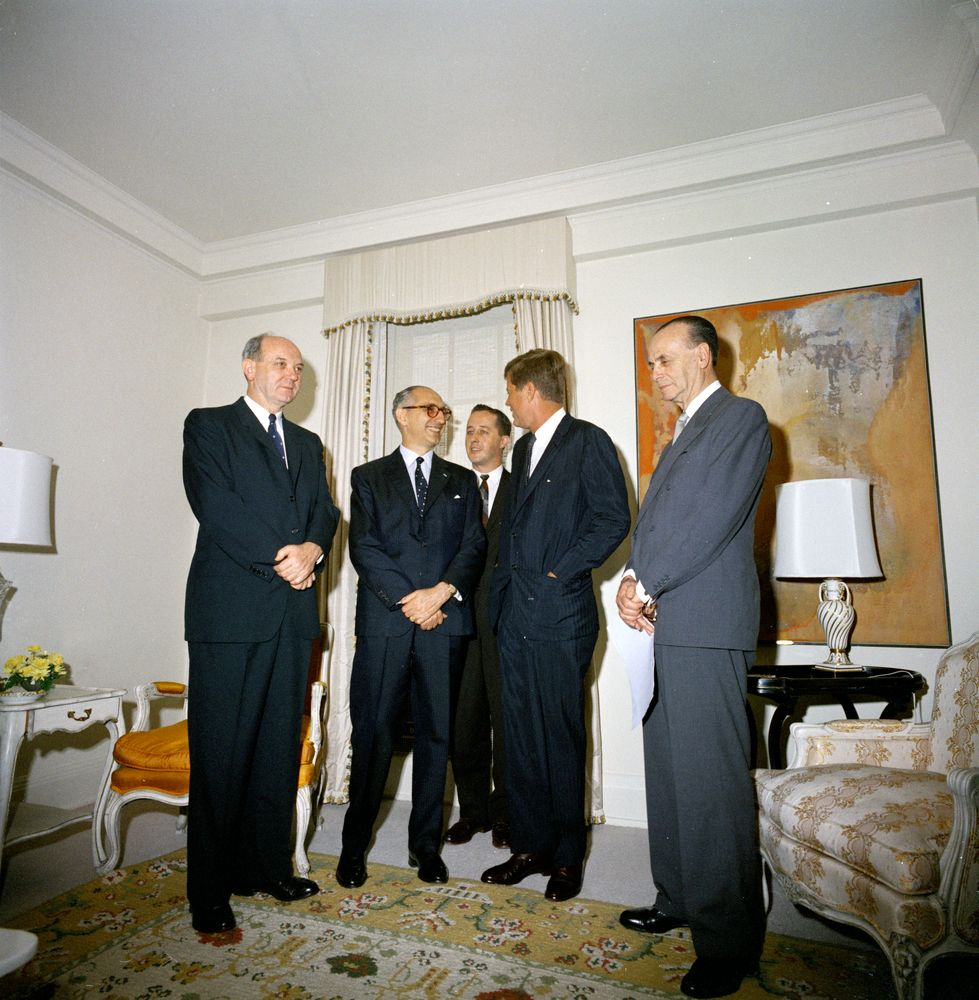
Frondizi and JFK.

Frondizi's relationship with others in the Kennedy Administration was not so friendly. Frondizi suspected—and may have complained to Adlai Stevenson, Kennedy's Ambassador to the United Nations—that the US ambassador to Argentina, Roy R. Rubottom Jr., was collaborating with elements of the Argentinian military to destabilize his regime. Relations between Frondizi and the US embassy worsened further when Argentina offered to mediate the tensions between the US and Cuba, which it later expanded to a proposal that Argentina, Brazil, Chile, and Mexico collectively serve as mediators. Of the four possible mediators, Arturo Frondizi argued in favor of Argentina, due to its balance in foreign policy (Brazil and Mexico were closer to third-partyism) and due to the lack of a deep internal contradiction (Chile had a conservative anti-communist government).

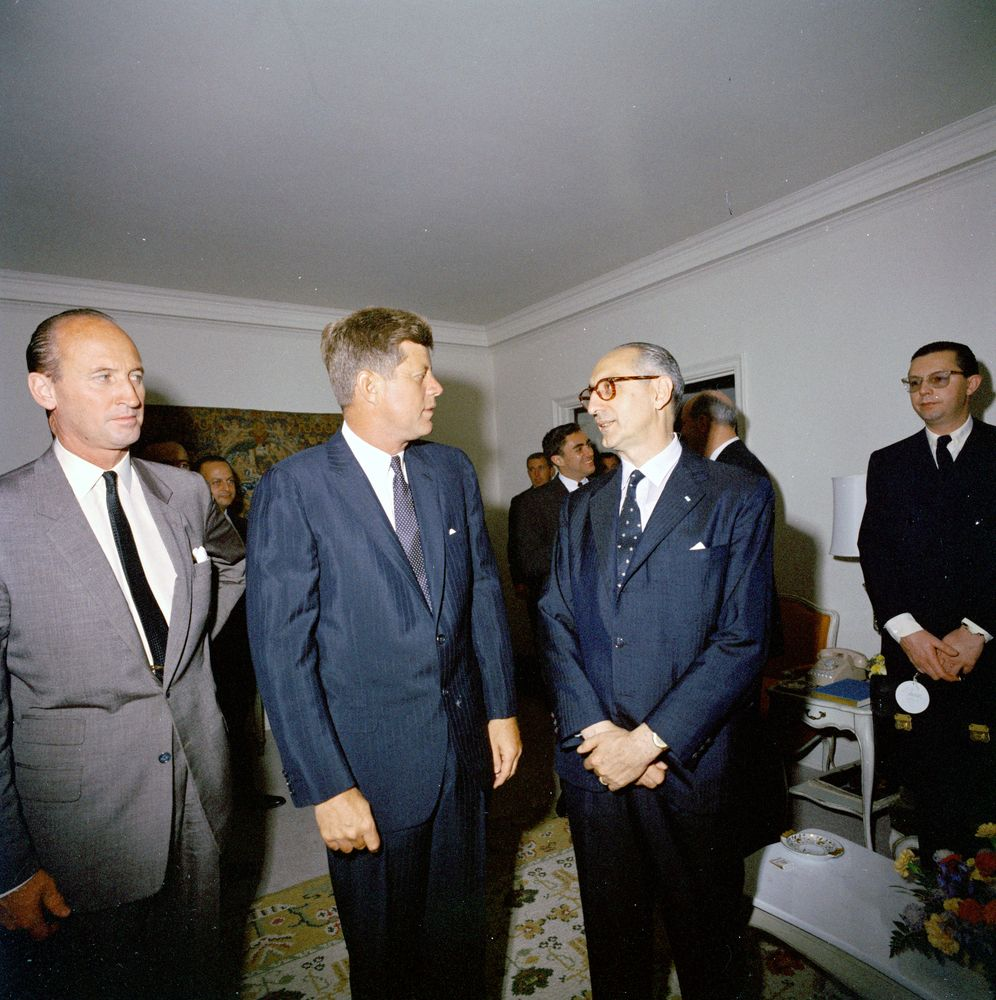
Frondizi and Kennedy.

Frondizi continued his efforts to negotiate an entente between the U.S. and Cuba. Preliminary talks were held at the Cuban Embassy in Buenos Aires. Someone who did not belong to the diplomatic service, but who was linked to the Frondizi team, contacted Ernesto Guevara in 1961 and let the Argentine president know that the Cuban minister accepted his mediation to try to find a negotiated solution. At the same time, some Argentines such as Horacio Rodriguez Larreta (father) met with Guevara in Punta del Este and participated in the famous meeting he held with Richard Goodwin, an advisor to President Kennedy. After that conference, Guevara let Frondizi know that he was interested in talking with him.

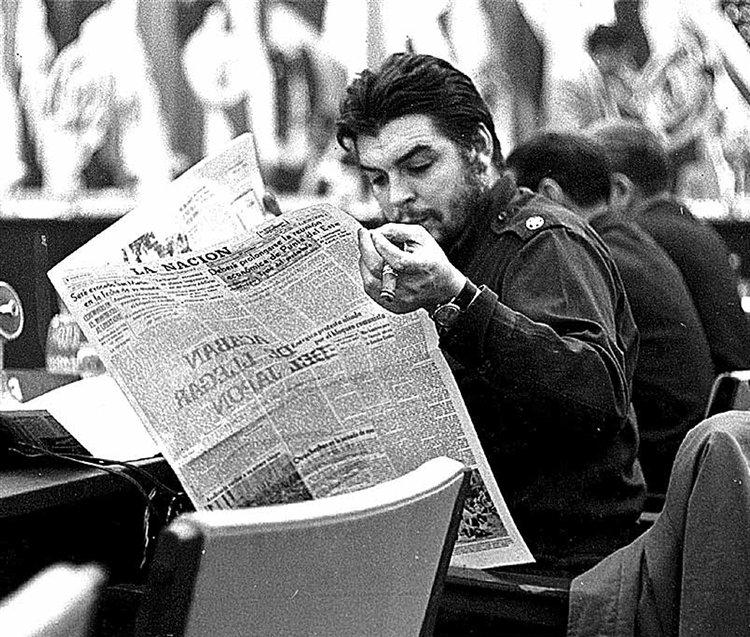
Che reading La Nación.

At that time, Guevara signaled his willingness to reach an understanding with the United States to coexist peacefully. Guevara told Frondizi that he wanted to speak with him and that he was willing to travel to Argentina. It was necessary to bring Guevara to Argentina in the most secret way possible, using a civilian plane, since it would cause a major political problem for the country if the military found out about this meeting.

The person chosen to take the Cuban leader to his meeting in Argentina was Congressman Jorge Carrettoni, who had orders not to fly on the same plane as the guerrilla leader so as not to arouse suspicion. Carretoni ignored those instructions when Guevara, fearing that he was being led into a trap to assassinate him, refused to fly without Carretoni.

Frondizi then met with Guevara at the presidential Quinta de Olivos residence. The meeting caused Adolfo Mugica to resign twenty days later from his position as Minister of Foreign Affairs and Worship on August 29, 1961. Frondizi's attitude towards the Cuban Revolution of 1959, along with the visit of Fidel Castro and Ernesto Guevara ended up weakening the government's relationship with the military power, even more than it already was. The army formally protested these meetings with Cuban leaders, and pressured the president to change his policy with respect to Cuba. Cuban exiles in Buenos Aires tried to forge documents with the intention of implicating members of the Government in an alleged Castro plot. Frondizi ordered an investigation, and even the army's own report, the famous case of the "Cuban letters," was nothing more than a lie.

Once the meeting between the President and Guevara was discovered, Frondizi said:

Only the weak avoid confrontation with men who don't think like them. None of the statesmen of the great Western nations refuse to speak with the leaders of communist countries. We never wanted to be rulers of a people afraid to confront their ideas with other ideas.

This meeting led the military to withdraw their support from his administration, as it opposed leftist populist movements and Communism. Cuban exiles in Buenos Aires circulated what appeared to have been forged documents implicating members of the Cuban government in support of leftist subversives in Argentina. Frondizi ordered an investigation, which concluded that the letters might be spurious. The army formally protested these meetings with Cuban leaders, and pressured the president to change his policy with respect to Cuba. Under pressure from the military Frondizi was forced to break relations with Havana on February 8, 1962.

==== Asia ====
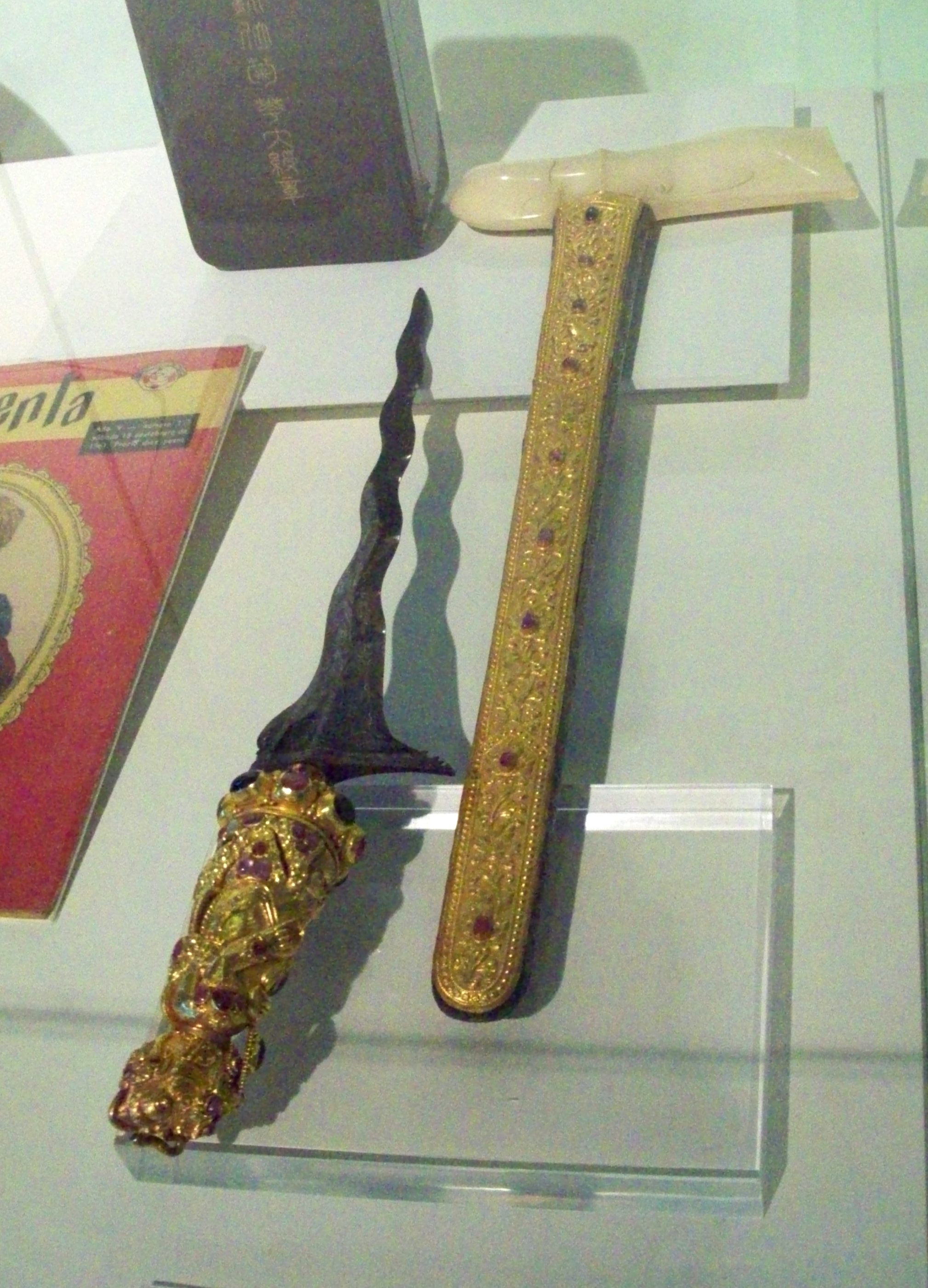
Gift from Premier Sukarno to President Arturo Frondizi.

During a tour of India, Thailand, and Japan, President Frondizi met Rajendra Prasad, King Rama IX and Emperor Hirohito. The objective was to seek new markets, in response to Argentina's imperative need to trade and obtain investments, a key to the program development and trade cooperation. In addition Frondizi sought to reinforce Argentina's non-aligned international position in the face of the Cold War.

==== Israel: kidnapping of Adolf Eichmann ====
At the end of 1952, the fugitive Nazi criminal Adolf Eichmann was located in Argentina thanks to information provided by a friend of the Austrian Nazi hunter Simon Wiesenthal. Given the difficulties that Israel faced in trying to obtain the extradition of Eichmann by Argentina (with the consequent danger that the criminal would flee), the Israeli secret services of Mosad planned the extrajudicial kidnapping of Eichmann with the firm support of Israeli Prime Minister David Ben-Gurion, thus violating consular assistance treaties and Argentine national sovereignty.

Eichmann was kidnapped in the middle of the street, hustling him into a private car as he was getting off the bus to return home from work, on May 11, 1960. Later, the four men of the Israeli Secret Service transferred him on May 20 from Ezeiza International Airport in Buenos Aires to Israel in a private plane under another identity and the pretense that he was drunk.

Faced with this kidnapping, the Foreign Ministry, through Ambassador Mario Amadeo, complained to the United Nations Security Council over this violation of its sovereignty. It received support from the international body, but Israel never intended to return the Nazi criminal to Argentina. Diplomats from the United States, Great Britain and France tried to formalize a meeting between President Arturo Frondizi and Ben-Gurion to seek a solution to the Eichmann case, and that diplomatic relations between Argentina and Israel would not be broken as a result. After several contacts, it was agreed that the meeting between the two leaders would be held in Brussels in June 1960. The meeting did not occur due to misgivings between both countries.

Ultimately, Frondizi severed diplomatic relations with Israel, relations that had recently been established by President Juan Perón. A short time later, Frondizi re-established ties with Israel.

On December 11, 1961, Adolf Eichmann was found guilty of crimes against humanity and sentenced to death on December 15, carried out on May 31, 1962. His last words were: "Long live Germany. Long live Austria. Long live Argentina. These are the countries that I identify with the most and I will never forget them. I had to obey the rules of war and those of my flag. I'm ready".

==== Antarctic Treaty ====
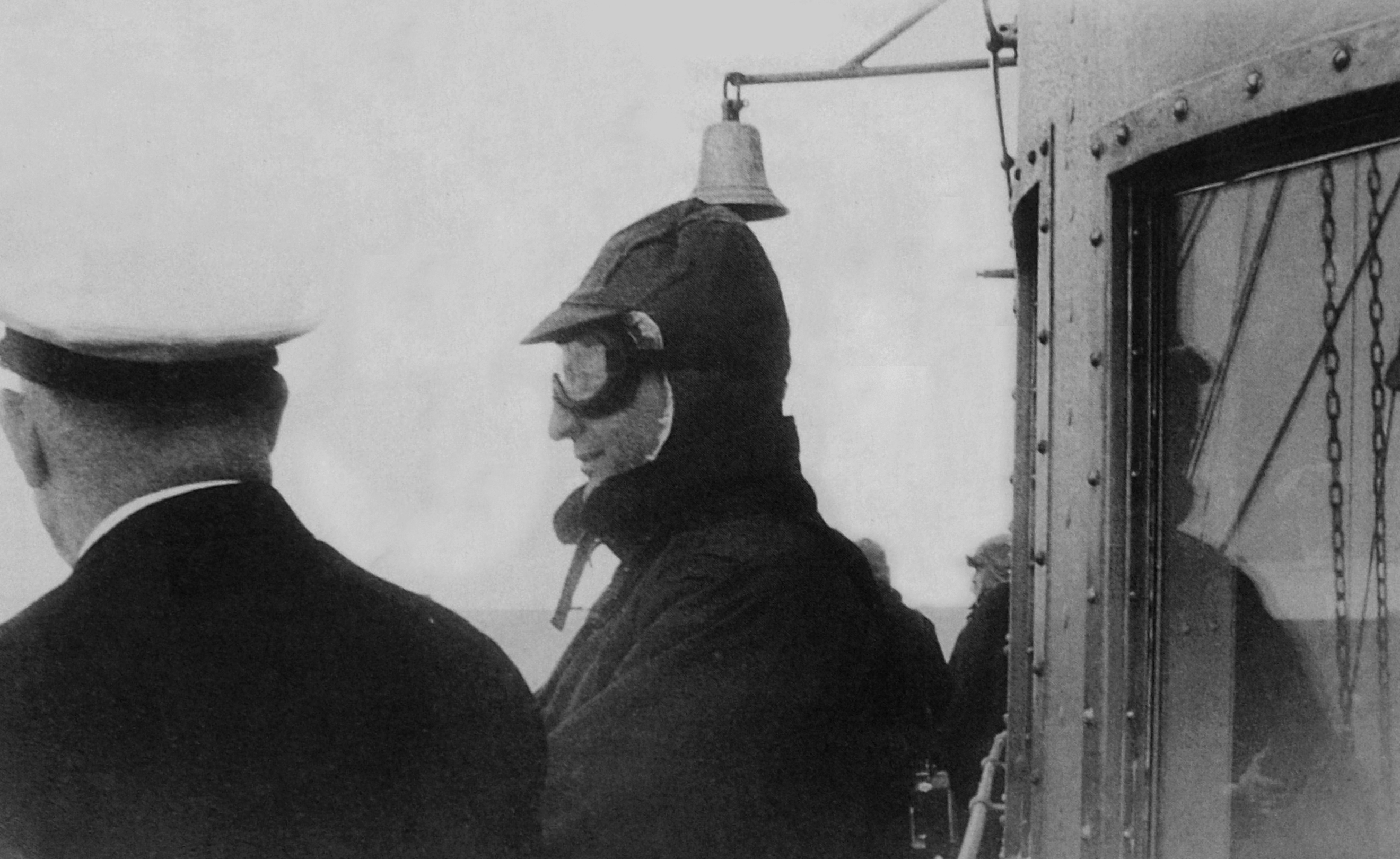
On a trip to Antarctica, March 1961.

The Antarctic Conference was inaugurated in Washington, D.C., United States on October 15, 1959, in an atmosphere of uncertainty. Representatives of twelve states attended the conference.

Of them seven claimed sovereignty over some fraction of the Antarctic continent: Argentina, Australia, Chile, France, Norway, New Zealand, and the United Kingdom. The territorial rights claimed by Argentina, Chile, and the United Kingdom overlapped considerably. Meanwhile, five other countries (Belgium, the United States, Japan, South Africa and the Soviet Union) had carried out explorations in the region without having presented territorial claims.

There were aspects of the future regulation for Antarctica for which there was general consensus, including the pacification of the continent and excluding all activities of a warlike nature, as well as guaranteed access for scientific research for any country that desired to do so. The most complex problem was the consideration of sovereignty claims.

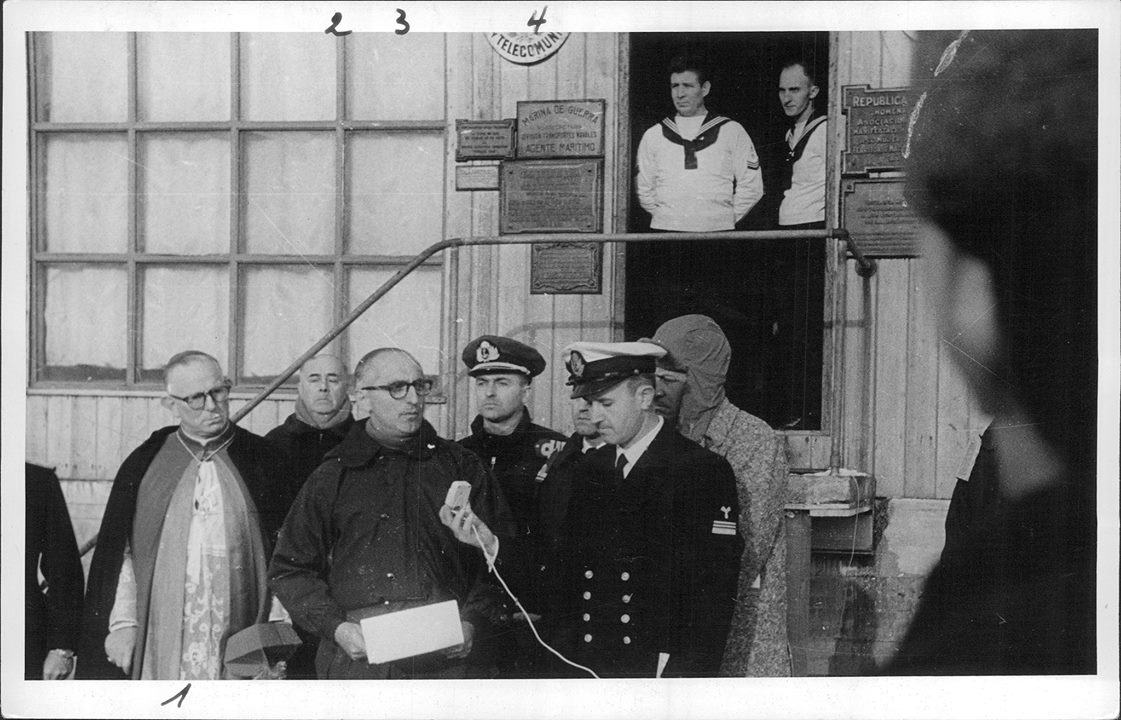
On Deception Island, President Arturo Frondizi gives a speech that is broadcast by radio.

Argentina's position was to establish the peaceful use of Antarctica and scientific cooperation within agreed limits, and that the Conference not modify the rights of the parties in the least. Regarding the use of the territory, the Argentine government maintained the need to put limits on absolute freedom, in order to preserve ecological interests, and to prohibit nuclear tests and the deposit of radioactive waste. The last proposal took the US delegation as well as the Soviet one by surprise, and the Argentine insistence on it came close to causing a crisis in the meeting, not only internationally, but also within the government of Arturo Frondizi.

The treaty was finally signed on December 1, 1959, and was maintained in accordance with the demands of Argentina that activities of a military nature be outlawed. The Antarctic Treaty entered into force on June 23, 1961. The pact had some success since the area remained free of conflict. The council also succeeded in internationalizing and demilitarizing the Antarctic continent, where nuclear testing and storing radioactive waste were banned and joint exploration and scientific research were permitted. The signatory countries obtained free access to the entire region with reciprocal rights to inspect their facilities.

In his speech on May 1, 1960, Frondizi dedicated a paragraph to the Conference on Antarctica, stating that Argentina had been able to include in the treaty its opposition to the internationalization of the area. The principles of freedom and scientific cooperation had also been included in the treaty.

After signing the treaty, Frondizi visited Antarctica. On March 6, 1961, he embarked, along with his entourage, in the Aguirre Bay to go to the Decepción base on (Decepción Island). The outward journey was somewhat uncomfortable, as they had to endure severe storms at the crossing of Drake Pass. On March 8 in the afternoon, they anchored in Bahía 1º de Mayo, and then with the icebreaker General San Martín the first tributes were paid to the authorities who disembarked, being transferred by helicopters and boats to the detachment where the honors were repeated. The military vicar Donamin held a mass, and from there Frondizi gave a speech to the country and greeted the members of the National Navy, researchers, scientists and technicians.

== Overthrow ==
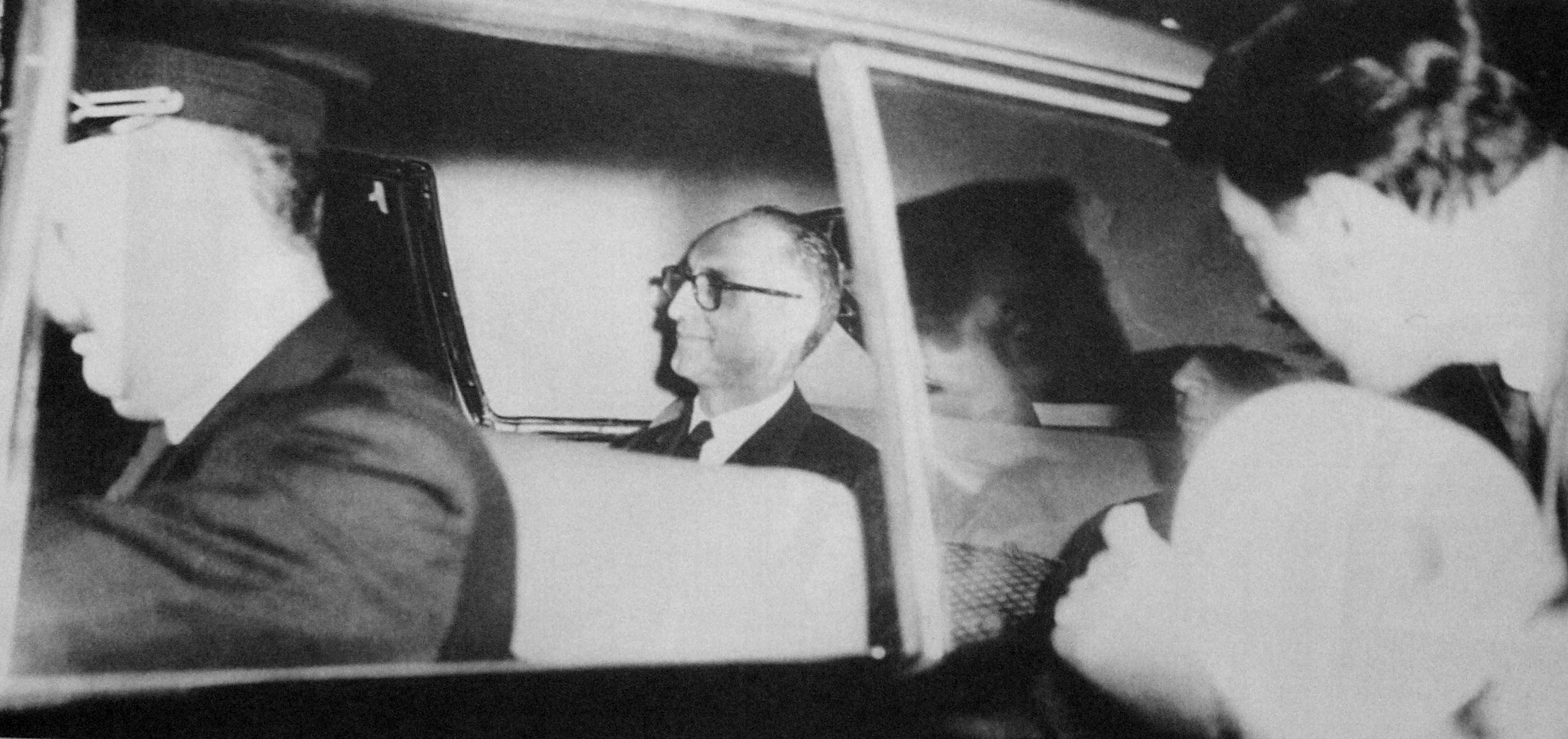
President Arturo Frondizi is taken prisoner.

The Frondizi government suffered great pressure from the military, suffering twenty-six military uprisings and six coup attempts. With Alsogaray's resignation in 1961, strikes by public employees, workers, and unions, and elections looming, Frondizi decided to reverse course and admit a relative participation of Peronism through alternative or neo-Peronist parties (Popular Union, Labor Party, Tres Banderas, etc.). He then ordered the national legislative elections to be held on March 18, 1962, coinciding with some provincial gubernatorial elections, including that of the crucial province of Buenos Aires.

Peronist forces initially announced that they were presenting the Framini-Perón ticket. Although Marcos Anglada ultimately won the nomination for the supporting position, the slogan "Framini-Anglada, Perón to the Rosada" revealed Peronism's determination not to tolerate any anti-democratic proscription.

Peronist candidates won the legislative elections in nine of the seventeen districts in which they were held and six governorships (Buenos Aires, Chaco, Neuquén, Río Negro, Santiago del Estero, and Tucumán), thus electing Framini, a combative textile unionist, governor of the crucial province of Buenos Aires.

The military wanted the president to annul the elections so that Peronism would have no representatives or senators in Congress; To prevent this, Frondizi attempted a maneuver and intervened in five provinces (all those won by Peronist candidates except Neuquén), with the idea of removing the elected Peronist governors, but not annulling the elections, as the military demanded.

The military launched a coup that overthrew him a few days later. When Frondizi answered the phone on March 29, 1962 at approximately 2:30 a.m., on the other end was Gastón Clement, his Secretary of the Navy, who informed him: "Mr. President, I want to inform you that your dismissal has been resolved and we are going to arrest you. I am very sorry, but I cannot do anything, and in a little while the head of the Military Household will visit you. I'll let you know in case you need to make any preparations." Frondizi replied: "No, thank you very much."

Around 4:00 in the morning, the Commander-in-Chief of the Army Lieutenant General Raúl Poggi sent a radiogram to all the military units: The President of the Republic has been deposed by the Armed Forces. This decision is immovable. At 7:45 a.m. on March 29, 1962, Frondizi left the presidential Olivos residence by car, accompanied by his usual personal security and by Captain Eduardo Lockhart, Head of the security service, heading to the distant Metropolitan Airport. There he boarded a Navy plane that took him to Martín García Island, where he was detained. Lockhart had personally drawn up the instructions to be delivered to the head of the base, who had already been notified by telegraph of the trip, so that he would receive treatment befitting his status as a former president.

Having ordered the overthrow of Frondizi, the coup plotters had not decided who would take over the government. At 11:00 am, with the presidential office vacant for almost eight hours, the three commanders—Lieutenant General Poggi, Brigadier General Cayo Alsina, and Admiral Agustín Penas—held the first of many other meetings to evaluate the alternatives without reaching agreement.

Frondizi, detained by the military, nonetheless refused to resign, stating "I will not resign, I will not commit suicide, I will not leave the country." His refusal to resign and the coup plotters' deadlock in choosing his replacement allowed for a civilian response to the military coup, in which Supreme Court Judge Julio César Oyhanarte and other members of the Supreme Court invoked the Law of Presidential Acephaly, which provided for succession in the event that the office of the President became vacant, to swear in the intransigent Radical Senator José María Guido, the provisional president of the Senate, as "provisional president."

The difficulties to carry out Frondizi's plan were many. Guido had no direct contact with Frondizi and his loyalty to the President prevented him from making any decision that Frondizi had not ordered. Defense Minister Rodolfo Martínez, for his part, not only did not belong to the UCRI, but had only assumed his post two days ago on the recommendation of Aramburu, and did not even know Guido personally. For that, Guido himself, the members of the Supreme Court, the coup commanders and the leaders of the UCRI had to be convinced.

The following day, a tragicomic situation arose when the military coup plotters, after sleeping to recover from the previous day's long day, went to the Casa Rosada to assume command. They were informed by the journalists assigned there that the country already had another president who had been sworn in that morning. Incredulous, the conspirators debated again how to carry out the coup and finally decided to administer an "examination" to the new "president," who promised to obey the military.

At 3:55 p.m., while the formalities for Guido's oath before the Supreme Court were still being completed, the three coup leaders settled in the Casa Rosada. Aware of the fact and with Guido on his way to court, Martínez went to the Casa Rosada to buy time and prevent the military from formally taking over the government, especially Poggi, who showed a clear intention to assume the presidency. Shortly after five o'clock in the afternoon, Guido appeared at the Supreme Court to take the oath, visibly shaken. The oath was carried out in the utmost reserve, with the sole presence of the judges of the Court, Guido, and his private secretary. Defense Minister Martínez had asked General Aramburu to join the small group, but Aramburu did not .

Tradition indicated that the oath was taken on the Bible, but due to the urgency and the lack of a Bible in the offices of the Court, the decision was made to take the oath on the text of the Constitution. Immediately afterwards Guido burst into tears and embraced Oyhanarte, asking that he not be considered a "traitor to his party or the people." Villegas Basavilbaso for his part said - expressing his objections -: "We can say, like Cicero, that we have saved the Republic by violating the law." It was Colombres who replied: "Cicero is wrong, because whoever saves the Republic can never be breaking a law."

The formal statement announcing the transfer of power, issued by Jorge Garrido, the General Notary of the Government of the Nation, stated that the Executive Branch was vacant "due to the de facto dismissal of the previous president," without mentioning Frondizi by name, and that Guido assumed the presidency "permanently." The declaration also noted that the signing took place "in the presence of the Commanders-in-Chief of the Armed Forces," the same men who had arrested and were still holding the constitutional president captive at the naval base on Martín García Island. The presidential staff and sash, symbolizing command, were handed over to Guido by Garrido.

== Later life ==
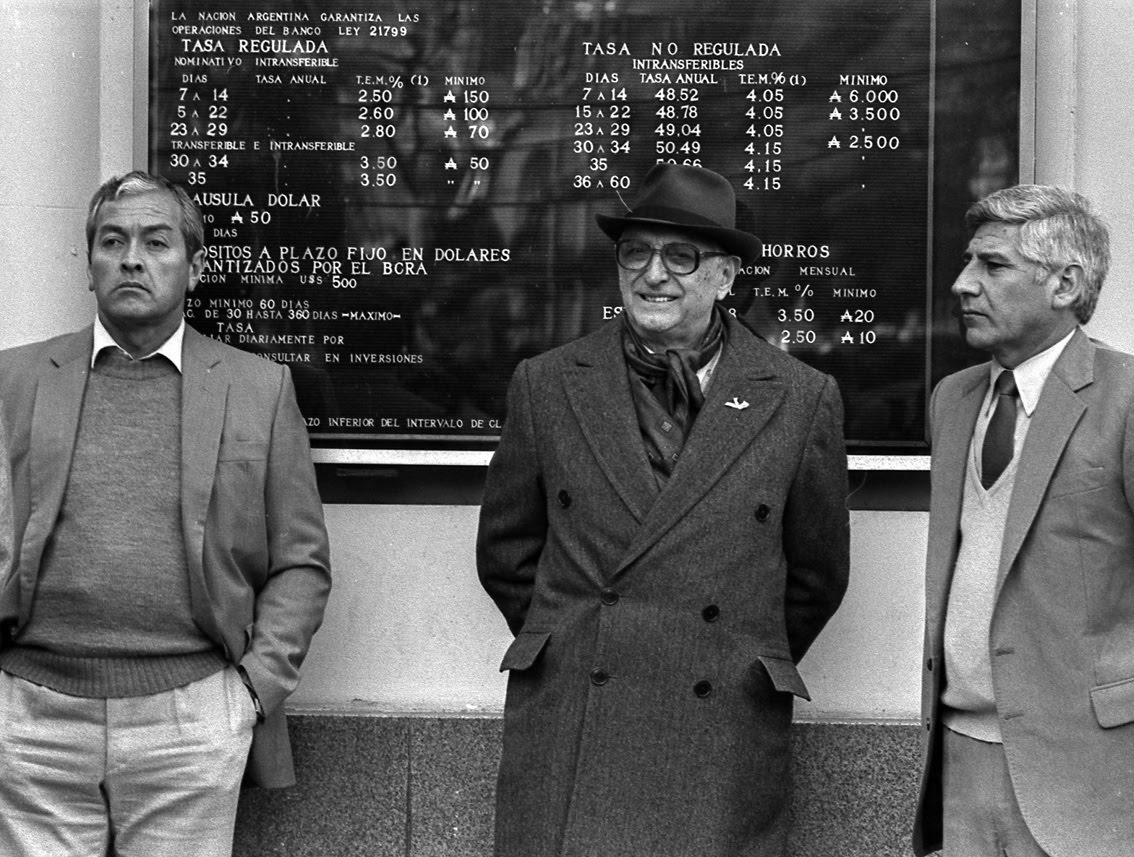
Frondizi in 1980.

Frondizi was held in detention until July 1963. After his release and the return of Frigerio from exile, they founded the Integration and Development Movement (MID) on a developmentalist platform. Unable to field candidates in the 1963 elections due to military and conservative opposition, the MID and Perón agreed on a "National Popular Front." The alliance was scuttled by military pressure, and the MID endorsed a "blank vote" option. Those among Frondizi's former allies who objected to this move backed the progressive former Buenos Aires Province Governor, Oscar Alende, an erstwhile Frondizi ally who ran on the UCRI ticket (its last) and finished second.

That same year, Frondizi created the Center for National Studies, the institution that served as a vehicle for his political activities after his removal from the presidency. After the pragmatic Arturo Illia's election as President in 1963, Frondizi harshly criticized his government.

Following Illia's election, the MID was allowed to participate in the 1965 legislative elections, sending 16 members to the Argentine Chamber of Deputies. Policy differences over Frondizi-era oil contracts, some of which Illia rescinded, led the MID to oppose him actively.

He briefly returned to journalism in July 1966, contributing a weekly article to the magazine Confirmado under the pseudonym Dorrego. In 1966, he openly supported the military coup that overthrew Illia, believing that the "Argentine Revolution" was an opportunity to make an economic revolution and free the country from "international monopolies and their allies in the country." However, when Adalbert Krieger Vasena took over as Minister of Economy, Frondizi considered that the revolution had been thwarted.

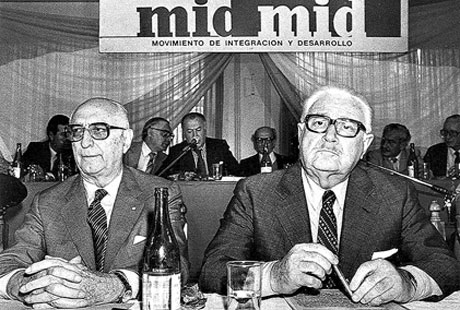
Frondizi with his advisor Rogelio Frigerio, during a meeting of their political party, the MID, in October 1984.

Frondizi's close advisor, Rogelio Frigerio, became a significant shareholder in Argentina's largest news daily, Clarín, following a 1971 deal made with the news daily's owner, Ernestina Herrera de Noble. Her late husband and Clarín founder Roberto Noble had supported Frondizi.

In March 1972, Frondizi visited Perón in Madrid. He began a series of conversations with him that led to a new electoral agreement between them in which the MID joined the Justicialist National Liberation Front (FREJULI), which won the presidential elections of March 1973, thus paving the way for Perón's return to power in September 1973. The content of the conversations between Frondizi and Perón has never been revealed beyond some minimal details until publication in 2012 of Perón and Frondizi: The Conversation by Luis Eduardo Meglioli, which quoted transcripts of their conversations that had been recorded without the knowledge of either leader.

Following seven years of military rule, the reopened Argentine Congress included 12 MID Deputies. Frondizi was given little say in the new Perónist government, and its policy shifted from populism to erratic crisis management measures. The return of Peronism exacerbated political tensions in Argentina, and there was an outbreak of violence between factions.

In 1973, members of Perón's government organized the Triple A, a right-wing death squad. Among its estimated 600 murder victims was Frondizi's brother, Law Professor Silvio Frondizi, who had served as chief counsel to the Trotskyist ERP. He was killed in 1974.

Frondizi initially supported the 1976 coup against Perón's successor (his inexperienced widow Isabel Perón). He maintained a wait-and-see attitude toward the regime, but gave implicit support to the dictatorship by authorizing leaders of his party, the MID, to hold positions in the military government, as did the Radical Civic Union, the Justicialist Party, the Democratic Progressive Party, the Popular Federalist Force, the Neuquén People's Movement, the Christian Democratic Party, the Intransigent Party, and the Democratic Socialist Party. One of the dictatorship's ministers, Oscar Camilión, and 94 city mayors were leaders of the MID.

Frondizi dropped his early support for the regime because it appointed an ultra-conservative Economy Minister, José Alfredo Martínez de Hoz. Numerous MID figures received death threats. In order to pressure the dictatorship to open a democratic solution, in 1981 Frondizi joined the Multipartidaria (Multiparty Movement), representing the MID, along with the Radical Civic Union and the Justicialist, Intransigent, and Christian Democratic parties.

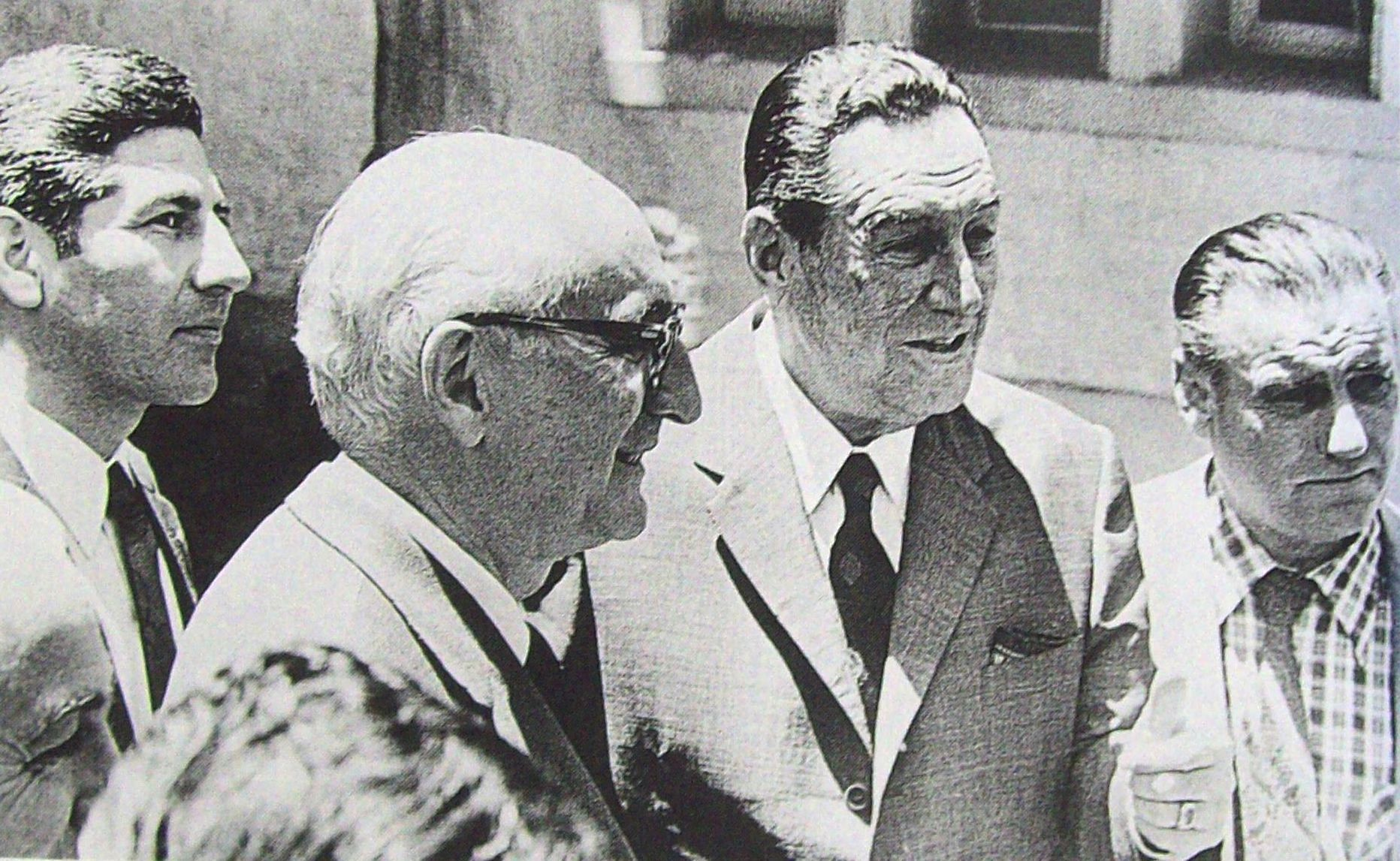
Frondizi with Peron.

=== The Malvinas War and the Return of Democracy ===
The dictatorship conducted the Dirty War against the political opposition, killing and injuring tens of thousands of political opponents and distantly related suspects in terrorist disappearances, kidnappings and torture. In 1982 it was defeated in the Falklands War, which further damaged its popular support. Finally the junta allowed return to democracy with elections in 1983. The dictatorship left an insolvent Argentina; business, political and consumer confidence almost shattered; and international prestige damaged because of its years of state terrorism against its population.

Suffering from the early stages of Parkinson's disease, Frondizi named his friend Frigerio the MID nominee for president in 1983. Refusing to condemn the regime's human rights atrocities, the MID fared poorly on election night. It garnered 4th place, obtaining 1.19% of the votes, and elected no congressmen. Elected by an ample margin, UCR leader Raúl Alfonsín excluded Frondizi from the economic policy discussions he held before taking office.

In 1986 Frigerio succeeded the ailing Frondizi as President of the MID, though the former president remained influential in the party. The MID maintained a considerable following in a number of the less developed Argentine provinces, where voters had fond memories of the Frondizi administration's development projects. It helped elect allies within the Justicialist Party (Peronists) in Formosa and Misiones Provinces, as well as Mayoral candidate Néstor Kirchner in Río Gallegos, Santa Cruz Province. Kirchner was later elected as governor and, in 2003, President of Argentina.

In the May 1989 elections, the MID joined the Justicialist Front for Popular Unity (FREJUPO), which ran Peronist Carlos Menem. After Menem won he appointed developmentalist Antonio Salonia as Minister of Education, while Frondizi himself was appointed as an honorary advisor in recognition of his services to the nation. His support soured when Menem turned to neo-liberal and free trade policies.

== Personal life and death ==
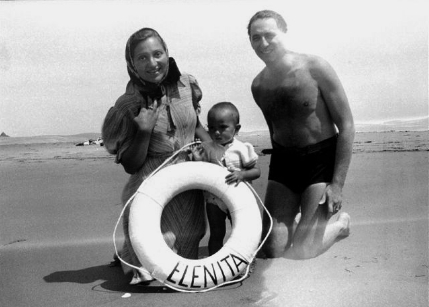
Frondizi with his wife Elena and his daughter Elenita.

On October 28, 1932, Frondizi became engaged to Elena Luisa María Faggionato, whom he married on January 5, 1933. His wife became his closest collaborator and was co-editor of his speeches.

They built a summer cottage in 1935 at the then-secluded seaside resort town of Pinamar. After the birth in 1937 of their daughter, Elena (their only child), the Frondizis named the cottage Elenita.

The Frondizis lost their daughter in 1976. The former president began to withdraw increasingly from Argentine politics after her death and that of his wife in 1991. Living in seclusion in his Beruti Street apartment in Buenos Aires' northside, Frondizi occasionally received political figures seeking advice. He made his last public appearance in 1983, after the return of democracy to Argentina, at the ceremony for the transfer of power to the newly elected President Raúl Alfonsín.

On April 18, 1995, Frondizi died of natural causes at the age of 86 at the Hospital Italiano in Buenos Aires. In 2019 his remains, which rested in the Recoleta Cemetery, were transferred to Concepción del Uruguay.

== Tributes and legacy ==
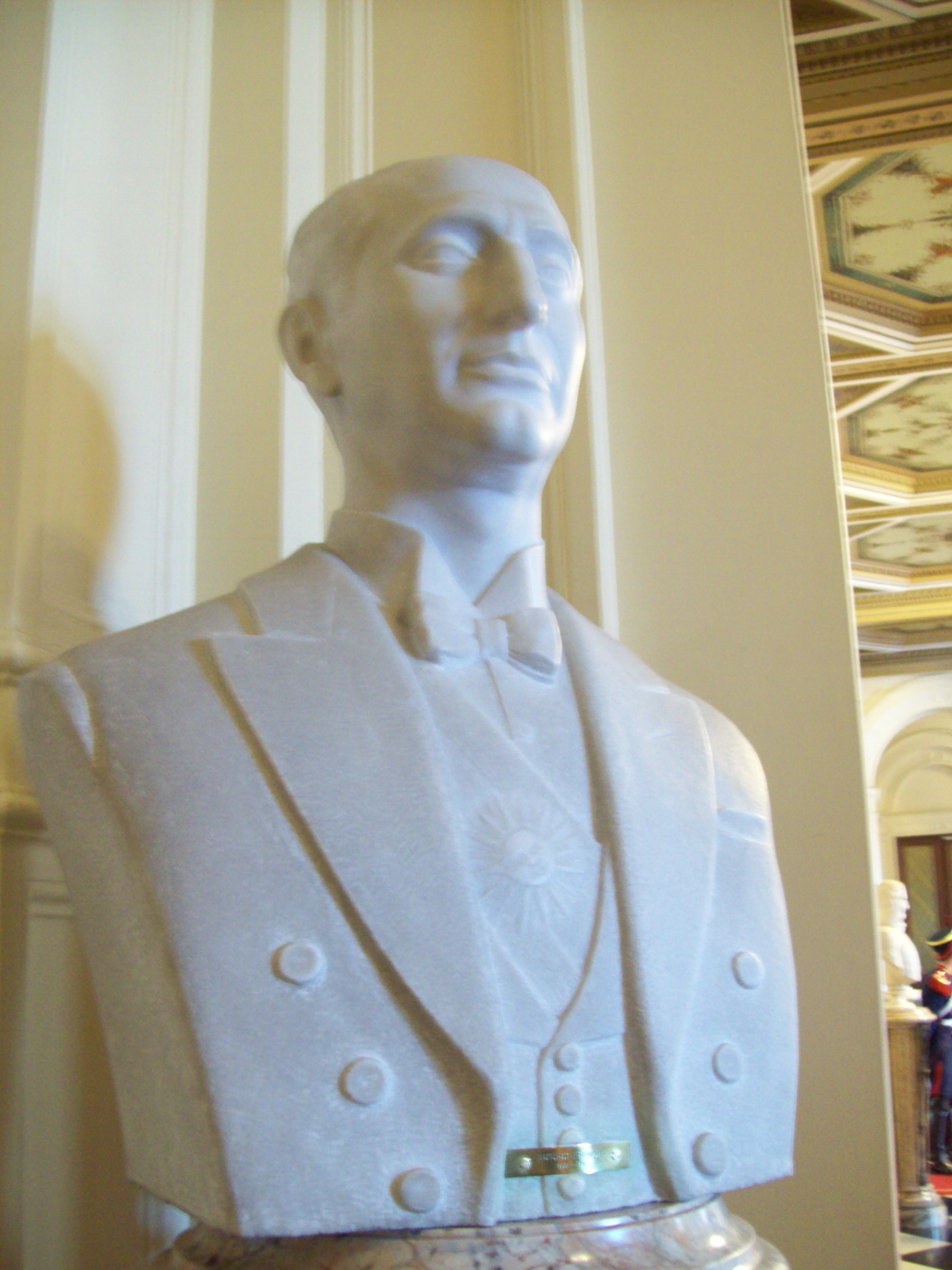
Frondizi bust in the busts room of the Casa Rosada.

Arturo Frondizi is recognized by many only as an effective politician, but as a statesman. In 1958 Frondizi set his aim on a modernization program. Sixty years later Frondizi's place in history and developmentalism is seen by many as a rather interesting proposal when it comes to thinking about the national destiny.

Frondizi had taken a critical stance toward the landing in the Malvinas Islands and considered it an exception in the Argentine political landscape, similar to the critical stance taken by Raúl Alfonsín. In 1984, Alfonsín, then President of the Nation, praised Frondizi's presidency, in a historic recognition of his administration by the non-Frondizi Radical faction.

On October 28, 1991, his eighty-third birthday, Frondizi donated his presidential sash and cane to the Museo de la Casa Rosada, which were kept in his apartment on Beruti Street, across from the German Hospital, in their original cases. The then-President of Argentina, Carlos Menem, thanked him for the gesture by saying: "My first vote was for you." Frondizi had said that he wanted to give them to the Casa Rosada so that "school children can see republicanism and the delegation of the powers of citizens to one person represented in them."

On May 30, 1992, Frondizi received his diploma of honor issued in 1931, along with other graduates of the UBA for whom he gave a speech. He was also awarded the Argentine Army's gold medal that same year.

On October 28, 1999, a plaque with the name of the former Argentine president was displayed in a square in Gubbio, in the Italian region of Umbria where Frondizi's parents were born, on the occasion of the anniversary of his birth. The mayor of the city, Ubaldo Corazzi and the president of the local Rotary Club, Gaetano Nardelli, represented the Italian officials. On behalf of Argentina, the ambassador to Italy, Félix Borgonovo; the Minister of Education, Manuel García Solá; the head of the Arturo Frondizi Foundation, Dr. Cañete and the former minister and official of the Frondizi government, Antonio Salonia. This is how this square in Gubbio was named «Piazza Arturo Frondizi».

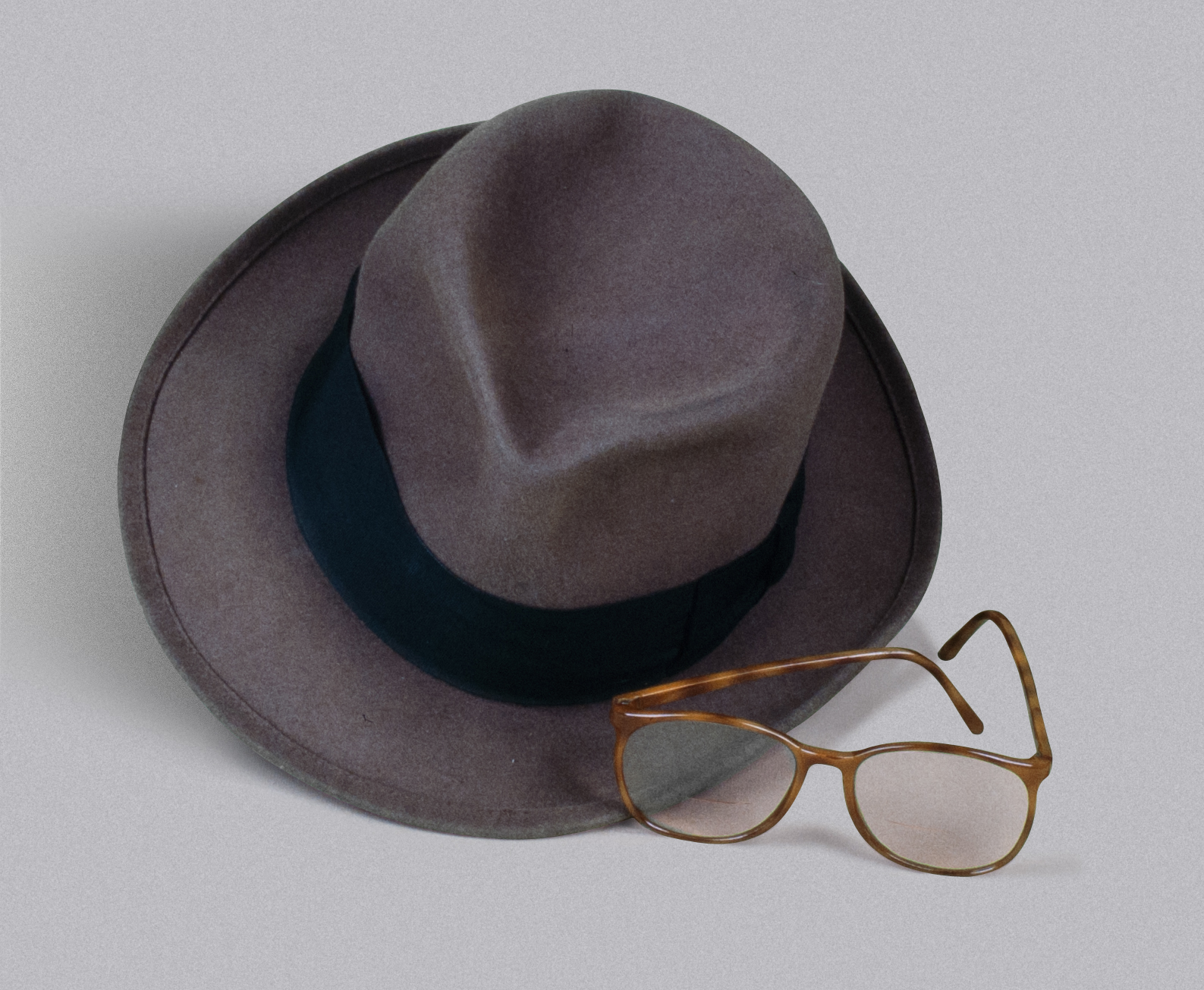
Arturo Frondizi hat and glasses.

Argentine politicians such as Cristina and Néstor Kirchner, Roberto Lavagna, Ricardo López Murphy and Eduardo Duhalde (among others), claimed to be admirers of Arturo Frondizi's management, regardless of their ideology or political party. Many of them considered him one of the best leaders, and also, as the last president with a vision for national development.

Ten years after his death, a tribute was paid at the central headquarters of Banco Nación, on Rivadavia Avenue, in front of the Casa Rosada, where more than one hundred and fifty friends and followers of him gathered. Frondizi was a great defender of democracy. Through his permanent developmentist affirmation, he opened a path that Argentines must necessarily travel, said Raúl Alfonsín, who praised Frondizi in this way despite the fact that they had both belonged to different lines of Radicalism, which were very much at odds at that time. The tribute lasted all that day.

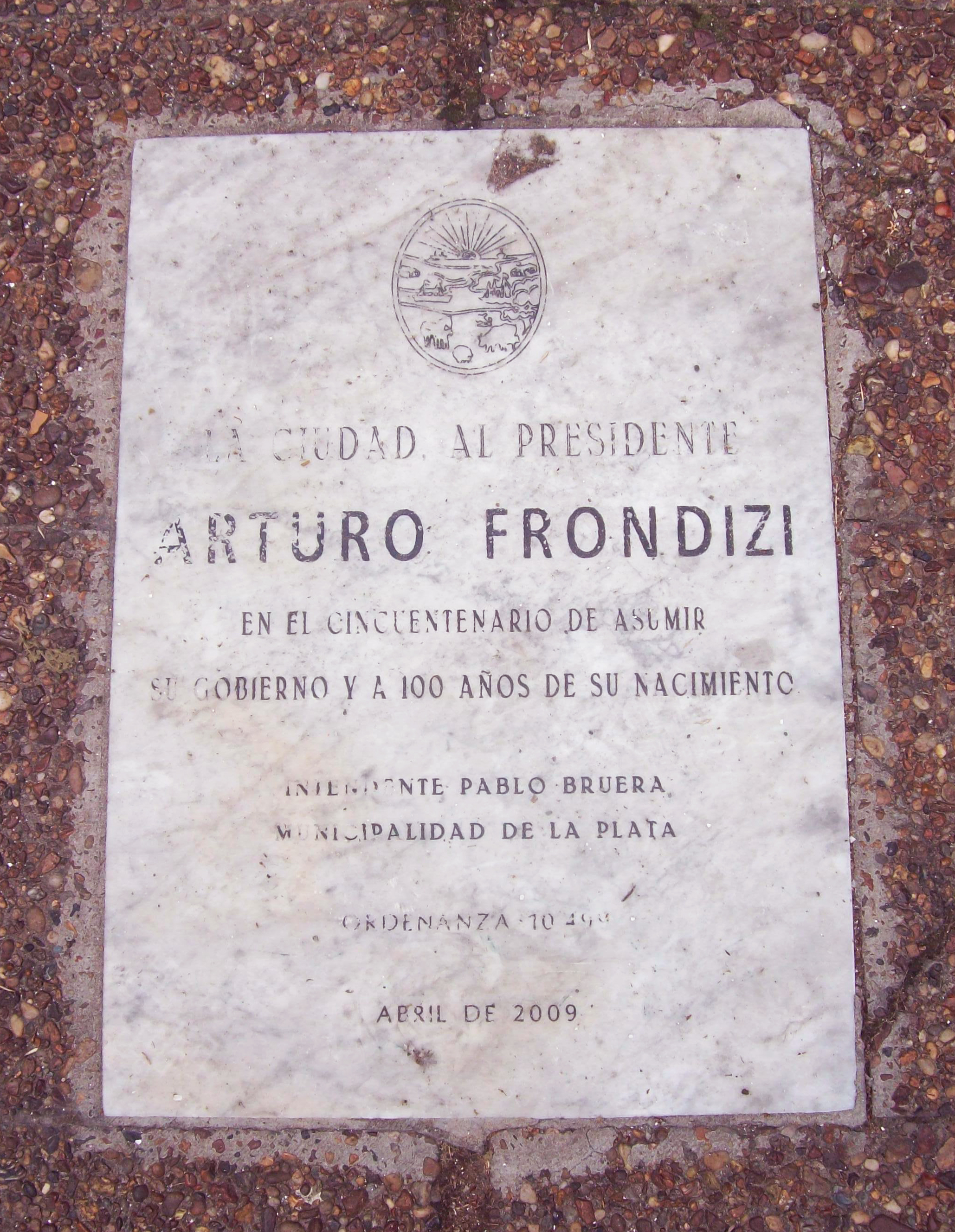
Plaque in honor of Arturo Frondizi, La Plata.

On March 6, 2008, the Legislature of the City of Buenos Aires renamed the 9 de Julio Sur Highway with the new name of Autopista Presidente Arturo Frondizi in homage to the former Argentine president.

By municipal ordinance 5465 of October 7, 2008, the name of "President Arturo Frondizi" was given to the Junín Industrial Park in homage to the contribution that the ex-president made to Argentine industry.

On June 22, 2008, a stamp with the slogan "Arturo Frondizi - 100 years after his birth - 50 years since he became president of the Nation" was presented in the Blue Room of the Palace of the National Congress. On the stamp you can see the face of the former president, and next to it, some oil extraction pumps, all with a light sky blue background.

On October 28, 2008, a statue in homage to the former president was erected in a square that bears his name in Paso de los Libres.

On April 3, 2009, the Argentine Government ordered the issuance of a coin with the image of Arturo Frondizi, in commemoration of the hundredth anniversary of his birth and the fiftieth anniversary of his assumption as president of the Argentine Nation. The measure was made official on March 4, 2009, in Law 26,479, published in the Official Gazette. The regulation bears the signature of Vice President Julio Cobos, that of the President of the Chamber of Deputies, Eduardo Fellner and that of Parliamentary Secretary Enrique Hidalgo.

On September 29, 2010, the councilors unanimously approved the draft ordinance to name "President Arturo Frondizi" to the La Carlota industrial park. The councilors participated in the Honorable Deliberative Council on September 29. The Justicialista Party supported the project, as did the UCEDE. Radicalism was not present, although Vice President Roberto Gadea stated that: «the important thing is the Industrial Park, therefore, the name is fine; so we also support this agreement.

Frondizi also received an extensive list of decorations and recognitions both nationally and internationally.

== Honours ==
Coat of arms of Arturo Frondizi as Knight Collar of the Order of Isabella the Catholic (Spain).

=== Decorations ===
Award or decoration	Country	Date
Grand Collar of the Order of the Condor of the Andes	Bolivia	8 July 1961
Collar of the Order of Merit	Chile	1 July 1958
Knight Grand Cross of the Order of the Legion of Honour	France	8 May 1960
Grand Cross Special Class of the Order of Merit of the Federal Republic of Germany	Germany	June 1960
Knight Grand Cross with collar of the Order of Merit of the Italian Republic	Italy	11 June 1960
Grand Cross of the Order of the Chrysanthemum	Japan	14 December 1961
Collar of the Order of the Aztec Eagle	Mexico	21 January 1960
Grand Cross of the Order of the Netherlands Lion	Netherlands	1 July 1960
Grand Cross of the Order of the Sun of Peru	Peru	17 April 1958
Knight of the Collar of the Order of Isabella the Catholic	Spain	7 July 1960
Knight Grand Cross of the Order of Chula Chom Klao	Thailand	8 December 1961
Honorary Knight Grand Cross of the Order of St Michael and St George	United Kingdom	4 July 1960
Collar of the Order of Pope Pius IX	Vatican	June 1960

=== Honorary doctorates ===
- Canada: University of Ottawa, 1961
- Peru: University of San Marcos, 1958
- Hawaii: University of Hawái, 1961
- Italy: University of Perugia, 1960
- Japan: Waseda University, 1961
- Spain: University of Madrid, 1960
- Thailand: Thammasat University, 1961
- United States: Fordham University, 1959

=== Awards and distinction ===
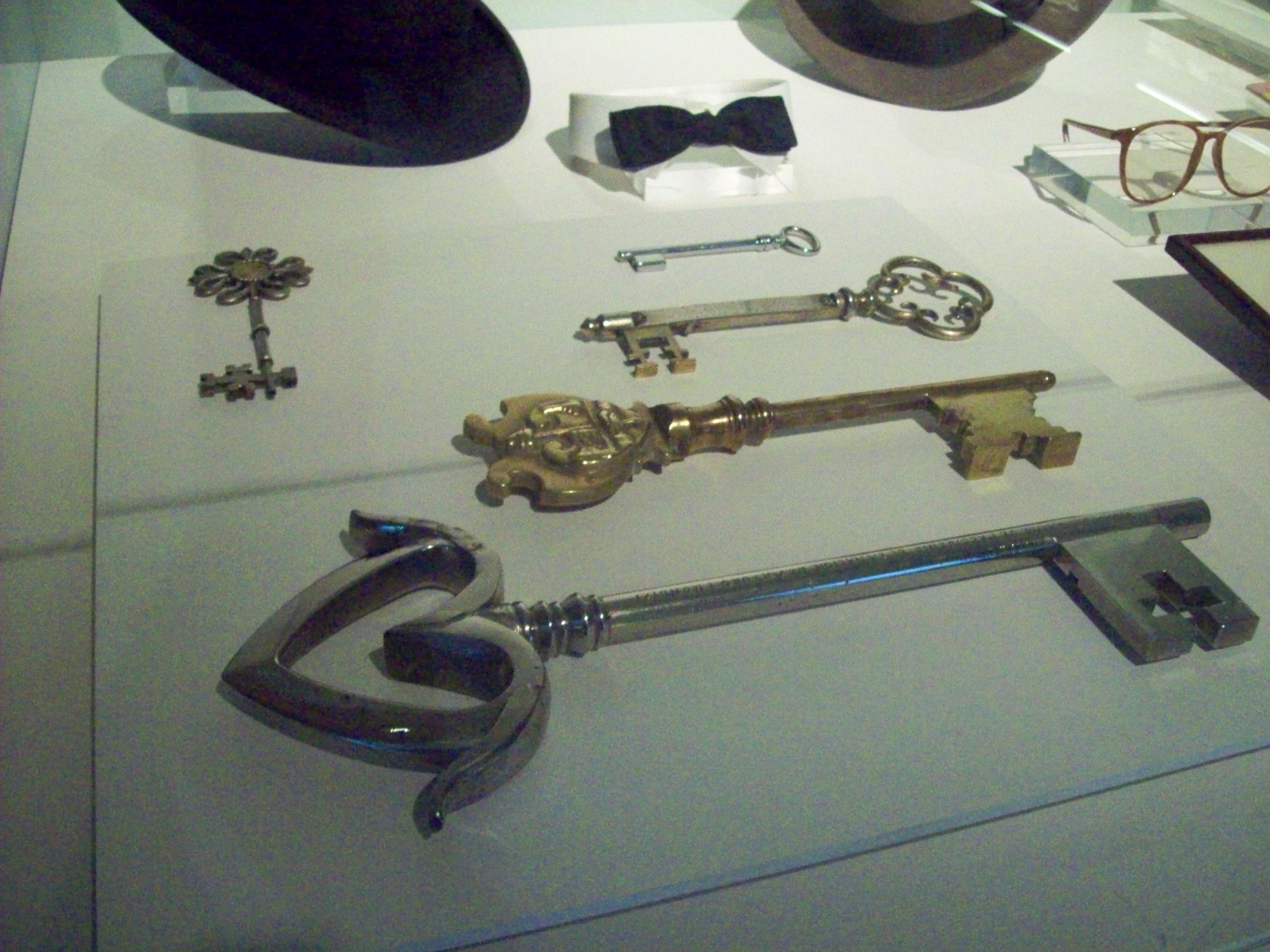
Several allegorical City keys that President Arturo Frondizi received in various visits to the interior of the country.

- Argentina: Konex of honour, 1998
- Japan: Key to the city of tokyo, 1960
- Spain: Key to the city of madrid, 1960
- Uruguay: Uruguayan Parliamentary Distinction, 1958

== Bibliography ==
- Potash, Robert A. The Army & Politics in Argentina: 1945-1962; Peron to Frondizi (Stanford University Press, 1969).
- Szusterman, Celia. Frondizi and the Politics of Developmentalism in Argentina, 1955—62 (Basingstoke: Macmillan, 1993),
- Belenky, Silvia. Frondizi y su tiempo. Buenos Aires: Centro Editor de Latinoamerica, 1984.
- Díaz, Fanor. Conversaciones con Rogelio Frigerio. Buenos Aires: Editorial Hachette, 1977.
- Frigerio, Rogelio. Los cuatro años (1958–1962). Buenos Aires: Editorial Concordia, 1962.
- Frigerio, Rogelio. Diez años de la crisis argentina. Buenos Aires: Editorial Planeta, 1983.
- Frondizi, Arturo. Qué es el Movimiento de Integración y Desarollo. Buenos Aires: Editorial Sudamericana, 1983.

Party political offices
Preceded by Santiago H. del Castillo	President of the Radical Civic Union; National Committee; 1954–1963	Succeeded by Oscar Alende
Political offices
Preceded by Pedro Eugenio Aramburu	President of Argentina; 1958–1962	Succeeded by José María Guido
