= Di Tella =

Di Tella is a surname. Notable people with the surname include:

- Clara Isabel Di Tella (born 1993), Argentine fencer
- Guido Di Tella (1931–2001), Argentine businessman and diplomat
- Rafael di Tella (born 1965), Argentine economist
- Torcuato di Tella (1892–1948), Argentine industrialist and philanthropist

== See also ==
- Siam Di Tella
- Torcuato di Tella Institute
- Torcuato di Tella University
