= Tangolates =

Tangolates (also known in Buenos Aires as Tango-Pilates and Pilates-Tango) involves body exercises that draw on characteristics from tango dancing and Pilates. It utilizes a partner method rather than individual exercises and incorporates aerobic and cardio elements. Tangolates is usually performed on a specially designed apparatus, on a mat, or on a Pilates apparatus.

== History ==
Tangolates originated in 2004 in a public hospital for patients with motor disorders. In order to help patients with their workouts, each one was coupled with an instructor in partner exercises.

== Research ==
In order to assess the effects of these exercises on patients, a preliminary test of efficacy was conducted at the Tamara Di Tella’s Pilates Room. The results of this research were presented at the 10th International Congress of Internal Medicine, held on 24–27 August 2004 in Buenos Aires.

According to Di Tella, the fact that Tangolates requires a rapport between two people is a very interesting subject of research. Di Tella claims that partner work may help stimulate the brain and could become an alternate pathway to successful movement. "It is that internal ignition that may just work for some brain disorder patients," says Di Tella. "Tango stimulates cooperation and creates bond like no other dance, and this is an extraordinary motivator for some patients", says Di Tella.

== Principles ==
Tangolates combines the coordination and core stability that is inherent to Pilates with the cardio or aerobic element of Tango.

== See also ==
- Tango
- Pilates
- Dance and health

== Books ==
- Pilates, Joseph (1928). Pilates' Return to Life Through Contrology. New York, NY: Presentation Dynamics (December 31, 1998). ISBN 978-0-9614937-9-0.
- Blandine Calais-Germain (1993). Anatomy of Movement. Eastland Press. ISBN 978-0-939616-17-6.
- Di Tella, Tamara (2005). Tangolates. Tamara Di Tella Pilates & Tangolates.
- Di Tella, Tamara (2003). Tamara Di Tella Pilates. Blue Series, LUMEN.
