= Manuel Mora y Araujo =

Argentine sociologist and political analyst (1937–2017)

- Born: 30 September 1937; Buenos Aires, Argentina
- Died: 26 May 2017 (aged 79); Buenos Aires, Argentina

Academic background
- Education: University of Buenos Aires

Academic work
- Main interests: Politics and society; business management
- Notable works: El voto peronista, Qué nos pasa a los argentinos, Liberalismo y democracia, Ensayo y error, El Poder de la conversación

Manuel Mora y Araujo (30 September 1937 – 26 May 2017) was an Argentine sociologist and political analyst; an expert in market research and analysis; founder of the consulting firms Mora y Araujo and Comunicación Institucional; author of a number of books and other published work in the fields of politics and sociology; 3rd president (2009-2011), Torcuato di Tella University in Buenos Aires.

== Biography ==
Manuel Mora y Araujo was born in Buenos Aires, 30 September 1937. He was latterly married to Carmen D. Kenning, and he had four children from two previous marriages. He began his academic career in 1965. In 1984 he founded the market research company Mora y Araujo & Asociados (today, Ipsos-Mora y Araujo; part-owned by Ipsos since 2000); and in 1990 the public relations and communication consultancy Comunicación Institucional S.A. (today, Mora y Araujo Grupo de Comunicación). He held two professorships at universities in Buenos Aires. He died on 26 May 2017.

== Studies ==
- Law and Sociology at the University of Buenos Aires.
- Graduate Fellow in Sociology, FLACSO (Santiago de Chile), 1963.
- Postgraduate study at the Sorbonne University of Paris, (Ecole Pratique des Hautes Etudes), 1964; and at the International Peace Research Institute, Oslo, 1965.

== Academic positions ==
- Lecturer in social research methodology, Department of Sociology, University of Buenos Aires, 1965.
- Director of the Department of Sociology, Bariloche Foundation, 1967-1971.
- Vicepresident of the Bariloche Foundation, 1969-1971.
- Visiting professor at the Hebrew University of Jerusalem, 1983.
- Director of the Social Research Centre, Torcuato di Tella Institute, 1980-82.
- Director of the Postgraduate Programme, Torcuato di Tella Institute, 1983-84.
- President of the board of directors of the Torcuato di Tella University, 1995-2009.
- Professor of Public Opinion Studies, Torcuato di Tella University.
- Professor of Political Marketing and master's course in Political Science, CEMA University.

== Professional and business positions ==
- Executive president, Ipsos-Mora y Araujo/Socmerc S.A. (market research and public opinion consultancy), 1984-2005.
- Director, Mora y Araujo & Asociados Comunicación Institucional S.A. (public relations and communication consultancy).
- President, Investigación y Consultoría Agropecuaria S.A. (ICASA) (agricultural market research consultancy).
- President, BAE Negocios S.A., publisher of BAE newspaper.

== Voluntary (unpaid) positions ==
- Founding member and former vice-president, Fundación Poder Ciudadano (civic institution dedicated to promoting public awareness), 1989-1996.
- Founding member and former president, Fundación Compromiso (organisation for the promotion and training of social and non-profit organizations), 1994-1998.
- President, Academic Committee of CEANA, Commission for investigating Nazi activities in Argentina, 1997-1999.
- President, Committee for celebrating the centenary of the Argentinian Christian Youth Association, 2001-.

== Writings ==
See:

- Author or co-author of many books including:
  - El voto peronista (Eng: The Peronist Vote) (with Ignacio Llorente), Buenos Aires : Editorial Sudamericana, ©1980
  - Qué nos pasa a los argentinos (Eng: What is happening to us Argentines) (with M E Aftalión and F A Noguera), Buenos Aires: Sudamericana/Planeta, ©1985
  - Liberalismo y democracia (Eng: Liberalism and Democracy), Buenos Aires : Manantial, 1988
  - The 1989 Argentine elections : post-election report : first results (with F A Noguera), Washington, DC : Center for Strategic and International Studies, 1989
  - Ensayo y error (Eng: Trial and Error), Buenos Aires : Planeta, ©1991
  - El Poder de la conversación (Eng: The Power of Conversation), Buenos Aires : La Crujía Ediciones, 2005
  - Survey of Constitutional Culture. Argentina: an Anomic Society , National Autonomous University of Mexico, 2006
- Political and sociological analysis in many specialist publications and newspapers in Argentina and other countries.
- Articles in English:
  - The position of Argentina in the system of international stratification, Studies in Comparative International Development, Springer (1972). p. 264-277
  - Leadership wanted, The World Today, v59 n3 (March 2003). p. 25-26
