= Torcuato di Tella University =

Private university in Buenos Aires, Argentina

Coordinates: 34°33′17″S 58°26′45″W

- Universidad Torcuato Di Tella
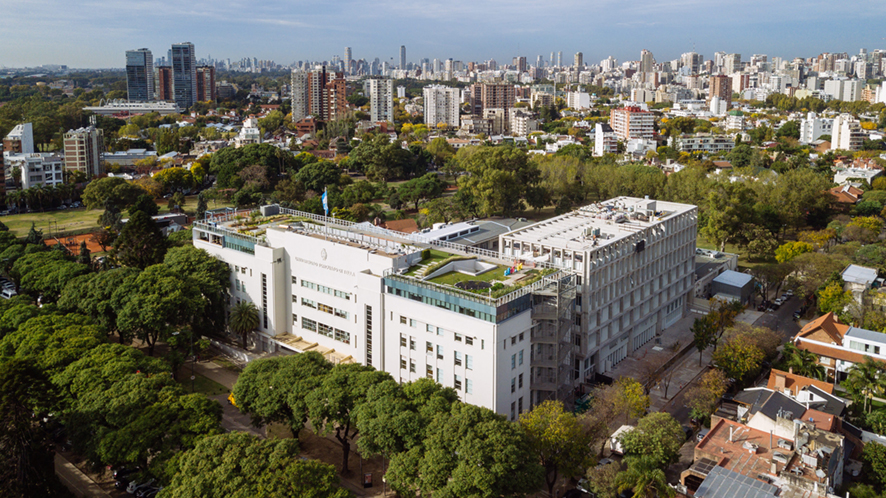
- University campus in Belgrano, Buenos Aires
- Type: Private
- Established: 1991; 35 years ago
- President: Juan José Cruces
- Vice-president: Martín Hevia
- Faculty: 256
- Students: 6,400 (2021)
- Undergraduates: 3,700 (2021)
- Postgraduates: 2,600 (2021)
- Location: Buenos Aires, Argentina
- Campus: Urban
- Website: utdt.edu
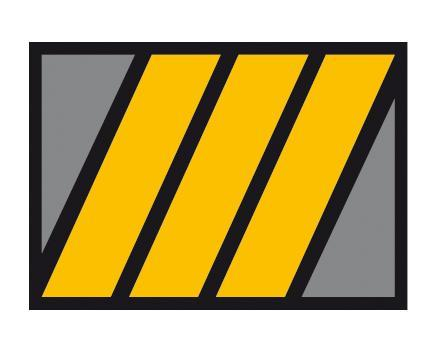

The Torcuato Di Tella University (Spanish: Universidad Torcuato Di Tella) is a non-profit private university in Buenos Aires, Argentina. Founded in 1991, the university focuses primarily on social sciences.

The undergraduate majors available are economics, business economics, digital technologies, business administration, law, political science, international relations, social sciences, history, architecture and design. The university also offers over 34 graduate programs.

The faculty comprises 98 full-time research professors, most of whom hold PhDs from universities in North America and Europe. The university provides more than 50 exchange programs with universities in Europe, North America, South America, Australia, Africa and Asia. There is also a sizable number of international students who study in the university for a semester or two. The university's President is Juan José Cruces.

== History ==
=== Background and foundation ===
The concept of the new university was developed by the university's first dean, Gerardo della Paolera, and the then Argentine ambassador to the United States, Guido di Tella. They decided to adopt an American university model, and to create a research-based university with small class sizes and professors with international studies and recognition.

In 1991, Universidad Torcuato Di Tella was founded with the mission of educating new generations of academic, business, social and political leaders. It was founded by the Torcuato di Tella Foundation and made use of the experience and resources of the Torcuato di Tella Institute. This institute was founded in 1958 to promote research in the scientific, cultural and artistic development of Argentina and became a leading local center for avant-garde art during the 1960s. The establishments' namesake, Torcuato di Tella, had become a leading Argentine industrialist through his manufacturing conglomerate Siam di Tella.

It began offering undergraduate studies in economics in 1992, but has since expanded and started offering undergraduate courses in business economics, political sciences, international studies, law, history, architecture and business administration, as well as numerous graduate degrees.

Gerardo della Paolera was president of Universidad Torcuato Di Tella from its foundation until 2001, when he was succeeded by the economist Juan Pablo Nicolini. Nicolini was reelected to the presidency in 2005, and continued in the position until September 2010, as he was ineligible for reelection to the post due to term limits established by the university's charter. The reputed sociologist and political analyst Manuel Mora y Araujo became president in 2009 and continued in that role until his resignation in May 2011 for personal reasons. Ernesto Schargrodsky, dean of the Business School, was subsequently named president. He was re-elected in 2014 to serve a full four-year term.

In May 2019, after his two four-year terms, Schargrodsky was succeeded by the economist Juan José Cruces, director of the Research on Finance Center and former dean of the Business School; he was reelected for a second four-year term.

=== Move to the Figueroa Alcorta campus ===
In March 2013, Universidad Torcuato di Tella moved to a new building on Avenue Figueroa Alcorta. The 13,700 m2 building is a redeveloped waterworks building was constructed between 1937 and 1942. It was put up for a tender in 1998 after Obras Sanitarias de la Nación was privatized, for which the university submitted the winning bid. The winning design was by a group of architects led by architects Clorindo Testa, Juan Fontana, Juan Barros Tomé and Horacio Rodrigo.

Works on the building had begun in 2002 and the business school had been working from this campus since 2004 on 1,200m^{2.}

The university in its entirety runs from this campus since 2013, and it has been extended twice and a green terrace was opened on its roof with views of the Rio de La Plata. From 2011 to 2018, the number of students has tripled, putting pressure on the university's infrastructure. In order to cater for the continued growth of the university, plans were made to construct a new building, which would be able to house an additional 1,000 students.

In December 2015, a competition was held to select the design of the building, which was won by Spanish architect Josep Ferrando, who proposed a modern building with an industrial style and allows for a flexible use of its space. The nine-floor building, with 11,646 m^{2} of surface space and an LEED certification, was inaugurated in March 2019 with Argentine vice-president Gabriela Michetti and the deputy mayor of Buenos Aires, Diego Santilli in attendance.

In 2022, due to the continued growth of the university, a new international architectural competition was held for the New Parque Building and a new Central Piazza. The winning design was by the BRUTHER studio in Paris. Construction of the 27,600 m2 building began in December 2023 and is expected to be completed by 2026.

=== Notable graduates ===
Javier Milei, Elena Highton de Nolasco, Marcos Peña, Nicolás Dujovne, Hernán Lacunza, Nicolás Massot, Carlos Melconian, Santiago Cafiero, Hernán Lorenzino, Esteban Matic, Paula Forteza, and Iván Werning are some of the university's most important graduates.

== Ranking ==
According to the QS World University Rankings, La Di Tella is among the second best private universities in the country and is ranked first in Buenos Aires. The Department of Political Science and International Relations is ranked among the top 100 departments in the world in this discipline.

University rankings

Global – Overall
- QS World: 951-1000 (2026)

== Business School ==
The Business School in Universidad Torcuato Di Tella has 20 full-time faculty and offers a bachelor's degree in Business Economics, an MBA, an Executive MBA and a Masters in Finance, as well as numerous executive education programs.

Since 2010, the Chilean business magazine America Economia has ranked Universidad Torcuato Di Tella among the top 10 business schools in Latin America.

The MBA program taught by the university is accredited by the London-based Association of MBAs (AMBA).

== Courses offered ==
Universidad Torcuato Di Tella offers undergraduate degrees in the following fields:

- Architecture
- Behavioral Sciences
- Business Administration
- Business Economics
- Design
- Digital Technology
- Economics
- History
- International Studies
- Law
- Political Science
- Social Sciences

The following graduate degree courses are offered:

- PhD in Political Science and Government
- PhD in International Relations
- PhD in History
- MBA
- Executive MBA
- Masters in Finance
- Masters in History
- Masters in Economics
- Masters in Applied Economics
- Masters in Management and Analytics
- Masters in Econometrics
- Masters in Political Science
- Masters in Law and Economics
- Masters in Tax Law
- Masters in Criminal Law
- Masters in Urban Economics
- Masters in History and Culture of Architecture and the City
- Masters in International Studies
- Masters in Public Policy
- Masters in Education Management
- Masters in Education Policy
- Masters in Journalism (in association with La Nación)

It also offers specialization studies in the management of education, educational policy, tax law, criminal law, architecture and technology, architecture and the landscape, preservation and conservation of heritage, advanced economics, econometrics and the management of NGOs (in association with Universidad de San Andrés and CEDES), as well as executive business education.

== Faculty ==
Universidad Torcuato Di Tella has 110 regular professors, of which 98 are full-time researchers, divided into nine departments:

- School of Law
- School of Business
- School of Government
- Department of Economics
- Department of Political Science and International Studies
- Department of Historical and Social Sciences
- Department of Mathematics and Statistics
- School of Architecture and Urban Studies
- Department of Art

Political scientist Natalio R. Botana, historian and economist Pablo Gerchunoff, sociologist and Peronism scholar Juan Carlos Torre, architect Jorge Liernur and historian Ezequiel Gallo are Emeritus professors. Historian Tulio Halperín Donghi, Economist Ana María Martirena-Mantel, and Nobel Laureate Finn Kydland are honorary professors.

== Research centers ==
Universidad Torcuato Di Tella has opened the following centers: the Center for Financial Research, the Entrepreneurship and New Business Development Center, the International Studies Center, the Crime, Institutions and Policy Research Laboratory and the Center for the Evaluation and Study in Social Economics for Poverty Relief.

The Center for Financial Research publishes the Consumer Confidence Index, the Inflation Expectations Index, and the Leader Index, that aims to identify changes in the economic cycle.

The Crime, Institutions and Policy Research Laboratory publishes a Victimization Index, which measures the percentage of people who have been victims of crimes in the previous 12 months.

ENI DI TELLA(Inclusive Businesses Think Tank of the Torcuato Di Tella University according to its Spanish acronym) is a think tank that promotes the development of inclusive businesses by creating and spreading knowledge and experiences. Given its mission, ENI has published a number of academic papers and research studies in this field such as: First Survey of Inclusive Businesses in Argentina – Entrepreneurships and Small Enterprises (2012-2013); Characterizing Emerging Markets (2012), The Service Dominant Logic: A Conceptual Foundation to Address the Underserved (2012).

The university opened the Torcuato Di Tella University Neuroscience Laboratory in 2014, which studies neuroscience and experimental psychology in an inter-disciplinary manner, with the presence of Lino Barañao, the Minister of Science, Technology and Productive Innovation of Argentina. The dean called the event "a first step in the development of hard sciences" for the university. Mariano Sigman is the director of the Laboratory, which has thirteen researchers.

== Library ==
Universidad Torcuato Di Tella's library is concentrated in the social sciences. It was founded with Torcuato Di Tella's private collection and has since grown with the scientific activity of both the Torcuato Di Tella Institute and the Torcuato Di Tella University.

The library has over 95,000 books, over 2,500 newspaper collections, and 6,000 digital documents. It has a collection of original editions dating as far back as the 17th century and access to numerous online databases. It has recently opened use of its online catalogue to the general public.

The Di Tella library includes the Max Hartwell, Carlos Escudé, Christiaan Huygens and Fernando Nadra collections. It also includes a collection of documents of trade unions in Argentina.

== Art collection and classes ==
Following in the tradition of the Torcuato di Tella Institute, Universidad Torcuato Di Tella hosts a modern art collection, and in 2004, inaugurated a former water company building refurbished by architect Clorindo Testa as its new center for visual arts. The core of its collection is the Edward Shaw and Maria Padilla de Shaw collection, which has 100 paintings of contemporary artists including Antonio Berni, Guillermo Kuitca, Antonio Seguí, Luis Fernando Benedit and Emilio Torti. The collection is constantly on exhibition in the university's two buildings.

Also in the tradition of the Di Tella Institute, the university has numerous prestigious art programs and workshops. Every year, 12 artists are awarded Kuitka scholarships, which allows them to meet with modern artist Guillermo Kuitca once a week to discuss their artwork.

The Department of Art and the Department of Historical and Social Studies jointly offer a Degree in Social Sciences (Art major).

== See also ==
- Siam di Tella
