= Renationalization of YPF =

2012 law in Argentina

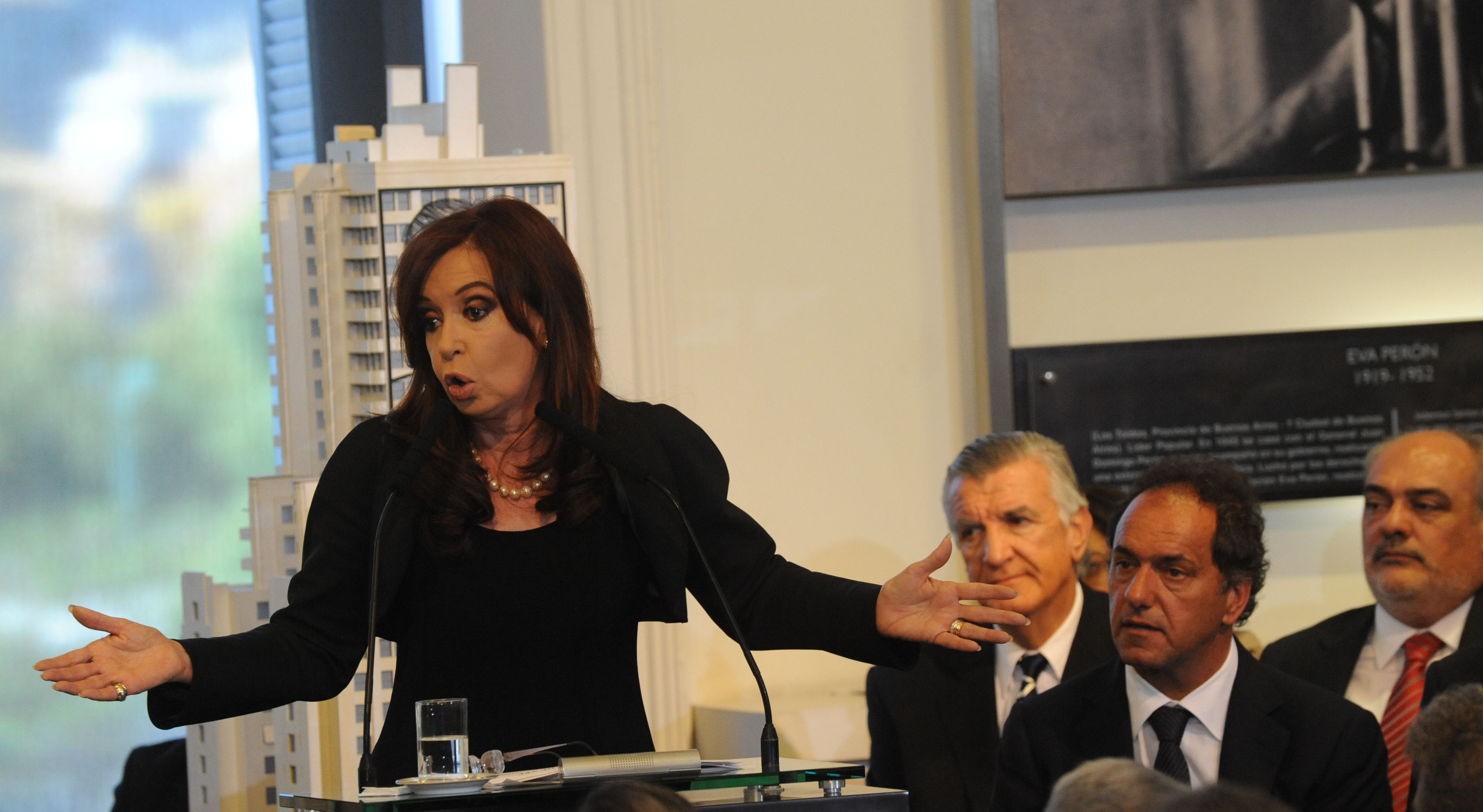
- President Cristina Fernández de Kirchner announces the bill to renationalize YPF.
- Date: 2012
- Location: Argentina
- Participants: Government of Argentina, Repsol, government of Spain, Petersen Group
- Outcome: Nationalization bill approved by Congress and signed on May 5, 2012; compensation agreement reached on November 27, 2013, for US$5 billion for a 51% stake.
- Website: www.ypf.com

President Cristina Fernández de Kirchner of Argentina introduced a bill on April 16, 2012 for the partial renationalization of YPF, the nation's largest energy firm. The state would purchase a 51% share, with the national government controlling 51% of this package and ten provincial governments receiving the remaining 49%. The bill was overwhelmingly approved by both houses of Congress, and was signed by the president on May 5.

The government of Argentina eventually agreed to pay US$5 billion in compensation to Repsol, which had previously owned YPF.

== Background ==
YPF was founded in 1922 as the first oil company in the world to be established as a state enterprise. The company grew to become largest in its sector in Argentina, and despite the divestiture of a sizable percentage of its extractive, refining, logistic, and retail infrastructure during its 1993 privatization, YPF in 2012 operated 52% of the nation's refinery capacity and accounted for 57% of the national market in gasoline and other motor fuels. Its share of petroleum and natural gas production nationally was 34% and 23%, respectively, in 2011; company revenues that year were US$13.7 billion.

The firm was privatized in 1993 on the initiative of President Carlos Menem and Economy Minister Domingo Cavallo pursuant to the State Reform Law of 1989, which authorized the president to present bills to Congress for the privatization of any of the numerous state enterprises in operation at the time. Madrid-based Repsol acquired a majority stake in 1999. Oil and gas production subsequently weakened while demand increased, and in 2011 Argentina recorded the first energy trade deficit since 1987 and it's still in deficit in 2022.

== Renationalization ==
Investment in exploration at YPF as a percentage of profits had been far below those in most other Repsol subsidiaries, and fell from 30 new wells in 1998 to eight in 2010 (French energy firm Total S.A. overtook YPF as the leading oil driller in Argentina). Its reserves of crude and natural gas fell 60% and 67% respectively between 1999 and 2011, and declines in output at the firm represented 54% of the nation's lost oil production and 97% in the case of natural gas.

Repsol and some market analysts blamed the decline in exploration and production on government controls on exports and prospecting leases, and price controls on domestic oil and gas. YPF, however, remained profitable throughout Repsol's tenure even as output fell, and net income from 1999 to 2011 at YPF totaled nearly US$16.5 billion.

The Kirchner administration in turn pointed to high dividend yields and low investment levels at YPF in relation to profits. Argentine Economy Minister Hernán Lorenzino claimed that asset stripping at YPF had financed Repsol's expansion in other parts of the world, while Repsol officials denied charges of underinvestment in its YPF operations and instead cited the Vaca Muerta discovery as a motivation for the takeover.

Vaca Muerta, a 30,000 km^{2} (11,600 mi^{2}) unconventional oil field with proven recoverable reserves of up to 927 million barrels, had been discovered by RepsolYPF in November 2011. Repsol executives declared however that government policies would have to change in order to allow investment in new production. Following bills signed by governors in six fossil-fuel producing provinces during March and April 2012 revoking YPF leases accounting for over a fifth of its production, the president announced on April 16 that the Argentine Government would acquire a majority stake in YPF. Repsol YPF Gas, a liquefied natural gas subsidiary in which Repsol had an 85% stake, was concurrently nationalized on April 19.

The Chinese state oil concern, Sinopec, was reported to have been in talks to buy out Repsol's share in YPF – a potential deal scuttled by the Argentine announcement.

== Resulting dispute ==
Repsol officials maintained that, per company statutes, the acquisition by any one party of stock held by Repsol equaling a 15% stake or more would trigger a mandatory purchase of Repsol's entire 57% stake (rather than the 51% sought). Repsol officials calculated compensation by multiplying the highest price earnings ratio reached by YPF in the prior two years by its earnings per share in 2011, and arrived at US$10.5 billion for a 57% stake. Argentine Deputy Economy Minister Axel Kicillof rejected these demands, however, citing debts of nearly US$9 billion. The book value of YPF was US$4.4 billion at the end of 2011; its total market capitalization on the day of the announcement was US$10.4 billion. Repsol claimed that the Argentine Government drove down YPF shares ahead of the announcement (market price of the shares declined by over half from February to April), and chairman Antoni Brufau estimated the company's potential loss at €5.7 billion (US$7.5 billion).

Repsol retaliated by canceling nine shipments of liquefied natural gas to Argentine state energy distributor Enarsa, claiming the government breached contracts following the seizure of YPF. Repsol filed a lawsuit at the World Bank’s International Center for Settlement of Investment Disputes on May 15. The Government of Spain petitioned the European Commissioner for Trade for sanctions against Argentine exports. The Spanish Government did unilaterally curtail biodiesel purchases from Argentina (its main provider), as well as from Indonesia. Following a complaint filed at the World Trade Organization by the Argentine Government as well as higher costs for biodiesel distributors in Spain itself however, boycotts of both Argentine and Indonesian biodiesel were lifted by January 2013.

An audit of Repsol documents conducted by Kicillof and Planning Minister Julio de Vido in May uncovered what Kicillof described as a "debasement of the company and a policy of creating shortages that would raise domestic prices to those prevailing internationally;" these findings were published on June 1 in the Mosconi Report. The Government of the Province of Santa Cruz published the results of an investigation of 13,000 inactive YPF oil wells on May 14, finding that 8,000 of these leaked and that at least US$3.5 billion of environmental damage had been caused by these; an environmental law enacted by the province in 2010 mandated the inventory and maintenance of all such wells. Other claims, including environmental damage in five other provinces, a tax debt in Chubut Province, and a judicial injunction issued against Repsol over their illegal sale in 2011 of 45 million shares belonging to an employees' severance fund, raised their potential liability to US$15 billion.

An agreement was reached with Repsol on November 27, 2013, whereby the latter would be compensated for a 51% stake in YPF with approximately US$5 billion in 10-year corporate bonds. Repsol sold its remaining 12% stake to Morgan Stanley the following May.

== The Petersen Group ==
The largest minority shareholder, the Petersen Group, held a 25% stake at the time of the renationalization, and had financed their initial purchase of 15% of the stock in 2007 with a vendor's loan from Repsol for €1.5 billion. The chairman and majority owner of the Petersen Group, Enrique Eskenazi, was close to President Néstor Kirchner, who supported Eskenazi's bid to become YPF's principal Argentine stockholder. Eskenazi benefited from a dividend distribution rate at YPF of 90%, which allowed the Group to repay its vendor's loan in installments. The 2008 agreement required Repsol to buy back shares owned by the Group and to assume the loan should the Madrid-based firm lose majority control of YPF. Sebastián Eskenazi, the son of the Petersen Group chairman and CEO of YPF until April 16, indicated however that the group would forego this option. The Group defaulted in May on a Credit Suisse loan taken in 2011 to raise its stake in YPF from 15% to 25%. Officials at Credit Suisse and at other creditors involved, including Banco Itaú, BNP Paribas, and Goldman Sachs, announced on May 11 that the Group's shares would be repossessed as collateral. Eton Park and Petersen Energia received no compensation and filed a lawsuit in 2015. In 2026, the United States Court of Appeals for the Second Circuit ruled 2–1 that the claims were not recognizable under Argentine law, saving Argentina $16–18 billion.

Repsol, as another of the Group's creditors affected by their default, also repossessed a block of shares, thus increasing their stake in YPF to 12%; following a steep rally in YPF shares, Repsol sold its stake a year later.

== Procedural and company developments ==
The Argentine Senate approved the takeover on April 26 with 63 votes in favor of the measure, three opposing it and four abstentions. The Chamber of Deputies approved the bill on May 4 with 208 votes out of 257, and the president signed the renationalization into law on May 5. Miguel Galluccio, an Argentine petroleum engineer with experience at both YPF and at oilfield services leader Schlumberger as president of its production management division in London, was appointed CEO.

Galluccio presented an investment program on June 5, 2012, to increase oil exploration by tenfold and gas exploration by twenty-fold, with the goal of raising production of oil and gas by 6% annually and of refined fuel by over 7% annually over five years. The US$39 billion plan would be largely self-financed, as well as by investments from Chevron Corporation and the periodic issuance of high-yield, 8.75% corporate bonds. These bond issuances were raised to US$1.5 billion per series in April 2015, as demand surged to US$4 billion.

YPF acquired a controlling stake in Metrogas (the nation's largest gas distributor) in November. YPF stock rose by 190% from its post-nationalization depths in mid-2012 to the announcement of a compensation agreement with Repsol in November 2013. Production declines of 6% annually under Repsol were likewise reversed. Overall output rose by 3% in 2013, and a further 8.7% in oil and 12.5% in gas during 2014. Output increased a further 3% in 2015.

Development prospects for the Vaca Muerta field, which by 2014 was estimated to contain at least 23 billion barrels of oil, attracted numerous joint exploratory ventures in subsequent years. The most significant such joint ventures include those signed with Chevron, Dow Chemical, and Petronas. The Vaca Muerta block operated jointly with Chevron produced 35,000 m^{3} daily by 2014.

Miguel Galuccio announced his resignation as CEO, effective April 30, 2016.

== See also ==
- Pink tide
