= Miguel Galuccio =

Argentine petroleum engineer (born 1968)

Miguel Matías Galuccio
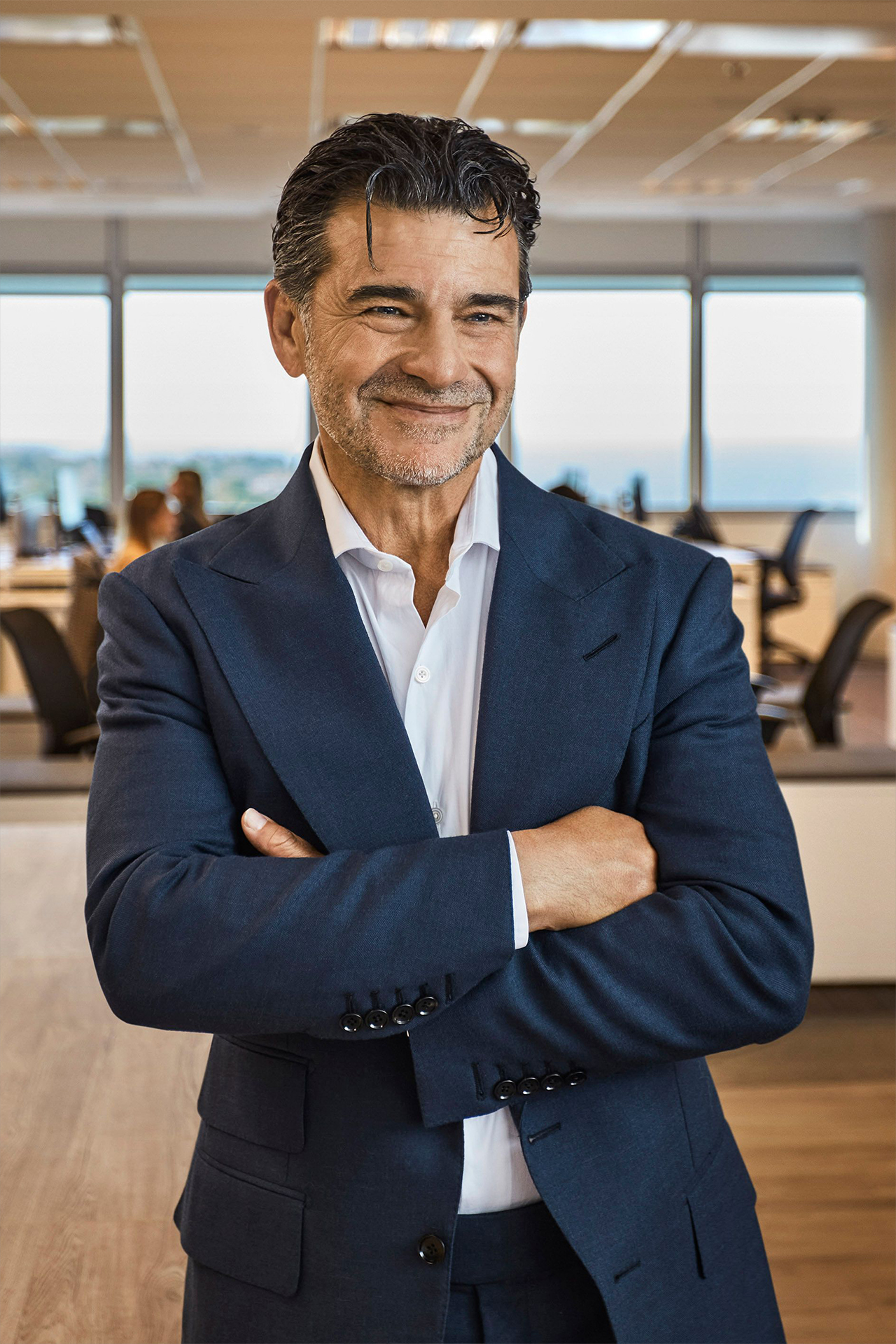
- Born: April 23, 1968 (age 58); Paraná, Entre Ríos, Argentina
- Education: Instituto Tecnológico de Buenos Aires (ITBA)
- Occupation: CEO in Vista Oil & Gas

Miguel Matías Galuccio (born April 23, 1968) is an Argentine petroleum engineer and executive. He was appointed CEO of the state energy firm YPF upon its renationalization on May 5, 2012. He is also the CEO of Vista Oil and Gas.

== Biography ==
Galuccio was born in Paraná, Entre Ríos Province, in 1968. He enrolled at the Institute of Technology of Buenos Aires (ITBA) and graduated with a degree in petroleum engineering in 1994.

Miguel Galuccio is an energy industry executive who has served in a variety of leadership roles in the energy industry.

He is the founder, Chairman and CEO of Vista, the first NYSE-listed independent energy company operating in the Vaca Muerta formation in Argentina.

He serves as an active board member of Schlumberger, the world’s largest oilfield services company, where he also began his international career. He held several senior positions at Schlumberger prior to serving as chairman and CEO of YPF, from May 2012 to April 2016.

Galuccio also co-founded and chairs GridX, a science-based company incubator focused on the creation of, and investment in, biotech startups. At present, GridX has formed companies targeting different sectors such as health, food, agriculture, energy, and materials, among others.
