= Torcuato di Tella =

Argentine industrialist and philanthropist

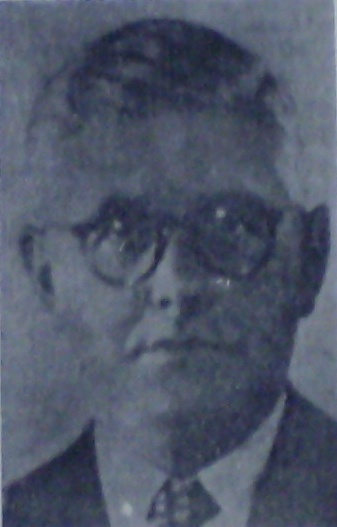
Torcuato di Tella

Torcuato di Tella (1892 – 1948) was an Argentine industrialist and philanthropist.

== Life and times ==
Torcuato di Tella was born in Capracotta, Italy, in 1892. He arrived in Argentina at age 13 and settled in Buenos Aires. A widespread 1911 bakery workers' strike prompted di Tella to develop a bread making machine, which he sold to a number of the city's panaderías as both a labor-saving device and a hedge against future strikes. The venture gave birth to Sección Industrial Amasadoras Mecánicas ("Bread Making Machine Industries"), or, simply, SIAM.

Di Tella enlisted in the Italian Army during World War I; upon his return, he enrolled in the University of Buenos Aires, earning a degree in hard sciences in 1921. The country's leading bread and pasta machine maker by the 1920s, di Tella's friendship with Enrique Mosconi, the Director of the newly established State oil concern YPF, helped result in a contract for their petroleum extraction pumps, pipes, and fuel dispensers, making SIAM a leading Argentine manufacturer. A military coup in 1930 resulted in the contract's rescission, however, prompting di Tella to convert his new factory in the southern Buenos Aires suburb of Avellaneda into the manufacture of industrial machinery and home appliances (particularly refrigerators), becoming an employer to 10,000 workers and the largest, domestically-based industrial conglomerate in Latin America.

Torcuato di Tella married a fellow Italian Argentine, María Robiola, and had two sons: Torcuato and Guido. He was politically active as a dedicated anti-fascist, assisting its victims in Italy, helping marshall opposition to Italian dictator Benito Mussolini and representing Argentina in numerous ILO conferences. He taught Economics and Management at his alma mater from 1944 and, never holding public office, di Tella drafted a number of work safety and other labor legislation proposals.

Torcuato di Tella died in 1948 at age 56, and per his wishes, his two sons (both engineers) took control of SIAM, renaming it Siam di Tella. The company continued to grow, albeit erratically, and in the 1960s became known for both its automobiles (producing 28,000 between 1962 and 1966) and its refrigerators (of which over 500,000 were made). The family established the Torcuato di Tella Institute, an educational and philanthropic society for the promotion of local artists, in his honor in 1958; the institute became a leading local promoter of avant-garde art in the 1960s. Competition from foreign subsidiaries, changing government policy towards free trade, and the vicissitudes of the Argentine economy itself helped bankrupt the company by 1981, however, and its last remnants were sold off in 1994.

His son, Torcuato S. and Guido di Tella founded the Torcuato di Tella University in 1991, the year Guido became Argentina's Minister of Foreign Relations.
