= Bank of the City of Buenos Aires =

Coordinates: 34°36′15.5″S 58°22′31″W

Banco Ciudad

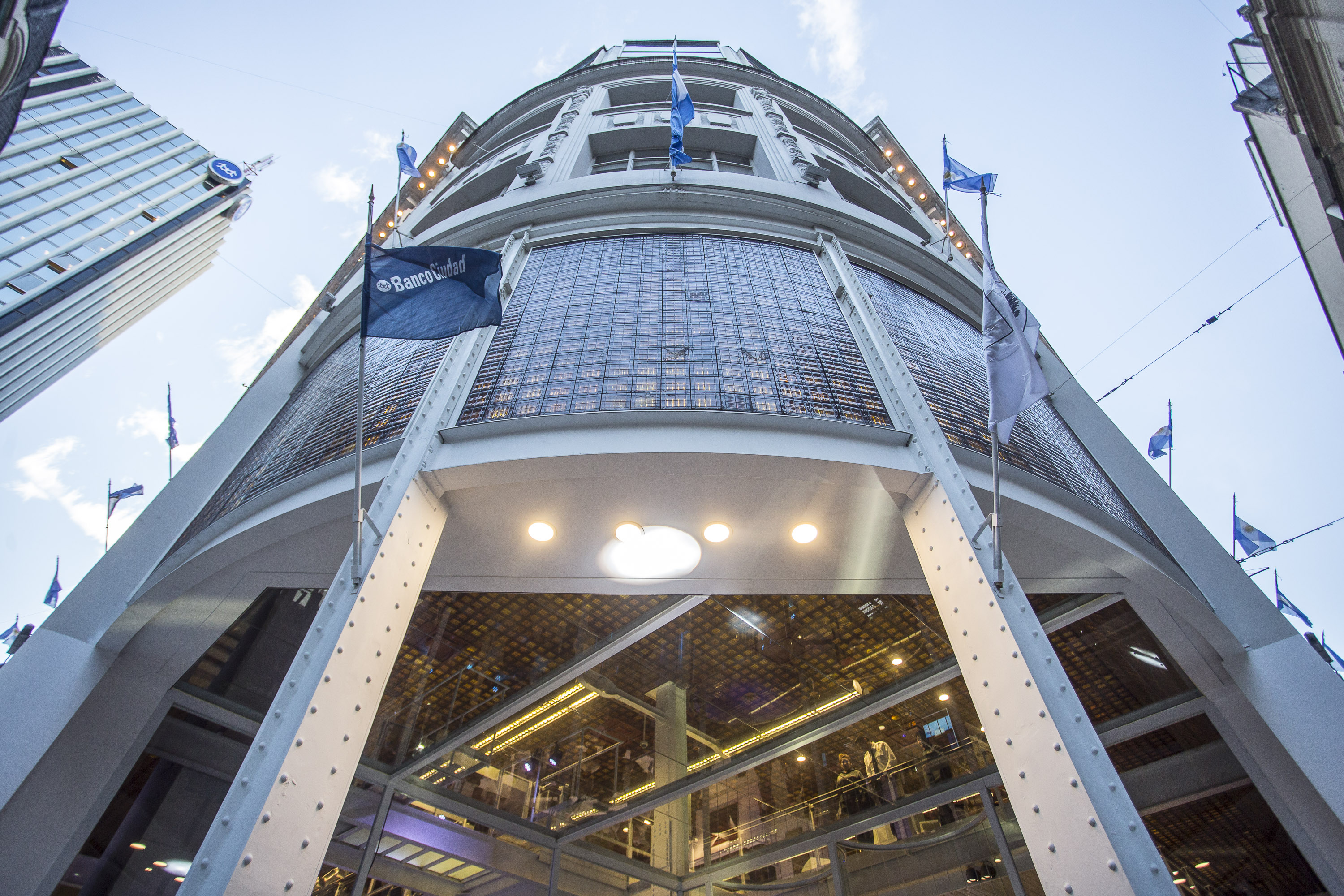
- Banco Ciudad headquarters
- Company type: Public bank
- Founded: 23 May 1878; 148 years ago
- Headquarters: Buenos Aires, Argentina
- Key people: Guillermo Laje (president); Fernando Jorge Elías (vice president)
- Products: Retail Banking; Business finance Trade finance Factoring; Mutual funds Pension funds Insurance; Mortgages; Consumer Finance; Credit cards
- Revenue: ▲US$ 600 million (2011)
- Net income: ▲US$190 million (2011)
- Total assets: ▲US$4.5 billion (4/2011)
- Number of employees: 3,150 (2/2010)
- Website: www.bancociudad.com.ar

The Bank of the City of Buenos Aires (Banco Ciudad de Buenos Aires), doing business as Banco Ciudad, is a publicly owned, municipal commercial bank in Buenos Aires, Argentina. It was founded on May 23, 1878, under the name Monte de Piedad (Piety Mount), with the purpose of fighting usury in the city (mostly targeting the growing wave of immigration in Argentina) by giving loans at a below-market interest, in order to reduce social inequalities.

== Overview ==
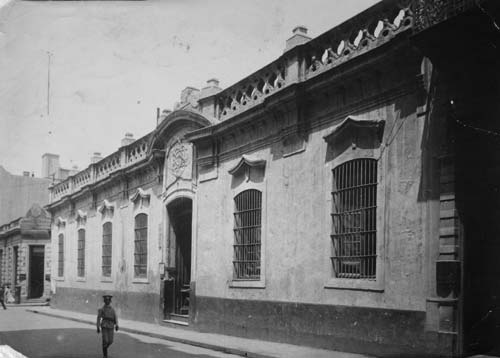
Monte de Piedad

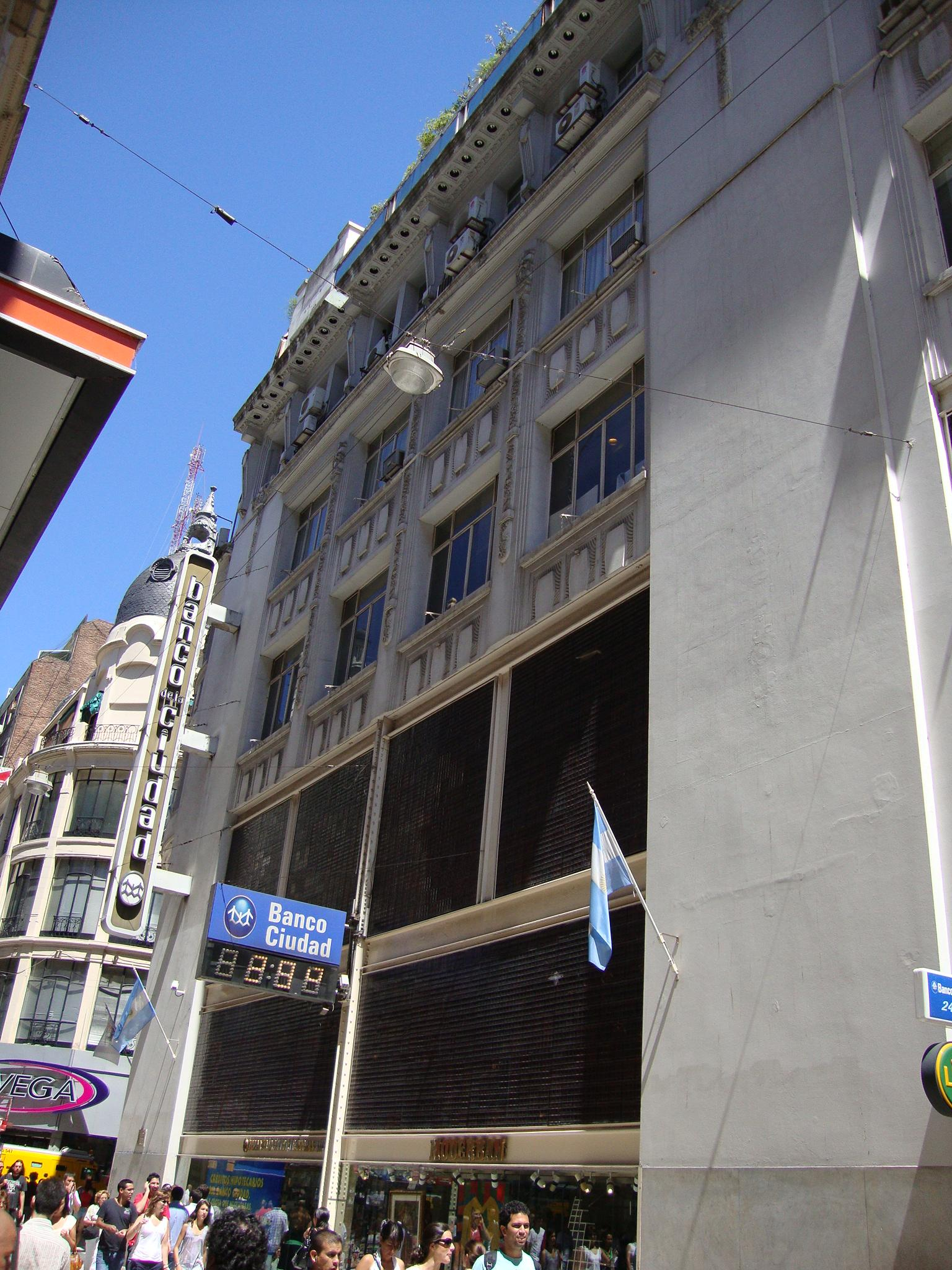
Florida Street headquarters

The bank was chartered on May 23, 1878, as the Monte de Piedad (Piety Mount) in a measure against the prevalence of usury in Buenos Aires (mostly targeting the growing wave of immigration in Argentina). The board of directors' first meeting on July 10 outlined the goal of "serving the working community, which is in the greatest need of such an institution." Opening its doors in a Montserrat ward residence formerly belonging to Viceroy Joaquín del Pino (1801–04), the bank grew quickly; in 1888, it was nationalized and transferred to the City of Buenos Aires.

Its new headquarters in the financial district was accompanied by new market capitalization, allowing it provide personal, business and mortgage loans and payday advances. It soon began to administer pension funds and became a leading local source for underwriting of initial public offering activity on the Buenos Aires Stock Exchange, government bonds, and foreign trade, as well. The institution was rechartered officially as the Municipal Savings and Loan Bank in 1904.

Following initially disappointing results, increased investment in bank branches, agencies and other forms of representation led to the institution's renewed growth, particularly during the tenure of bank president Enrique Peña, who in 1916 committed the institution to "combat usury in the most effective possible way – making branches readily available throughout the city so as to lessen inconvenience to those who need our services."

A nationalist coup in 1943 led to the sudden advent of Col. Juan Perón as the new regime's chief policy-maker. The new government quickly made the control of price gouging in banking and public services a policy centerpiece, and in 1944, the savings & loan was again re-chartered as the Municipal Bank of Buenos Aires to give depositors more commercial banking options in Argentina's growing public sector.

The bank became a leader in small business lending, and financed public housing projects in underprivileged areas. The city purchased a downtown lot on the massive Nueve de Julio Avenue (where the Mercado del Plata wholesaler stood) in 1947 for the construction of municipal offices, and an important branch was opened therein after the building's 1961 completion. The bank's headquarters were relocated to a refurbished Florida Street building, the former A la Ciudad de México department store, in 1968. These and other new offices allowed the bank to expand its larger-scale commercial lending activities. Its growing competition with the Bank of the Province of Buenos Aires led to the adoption of its current name in 1972.

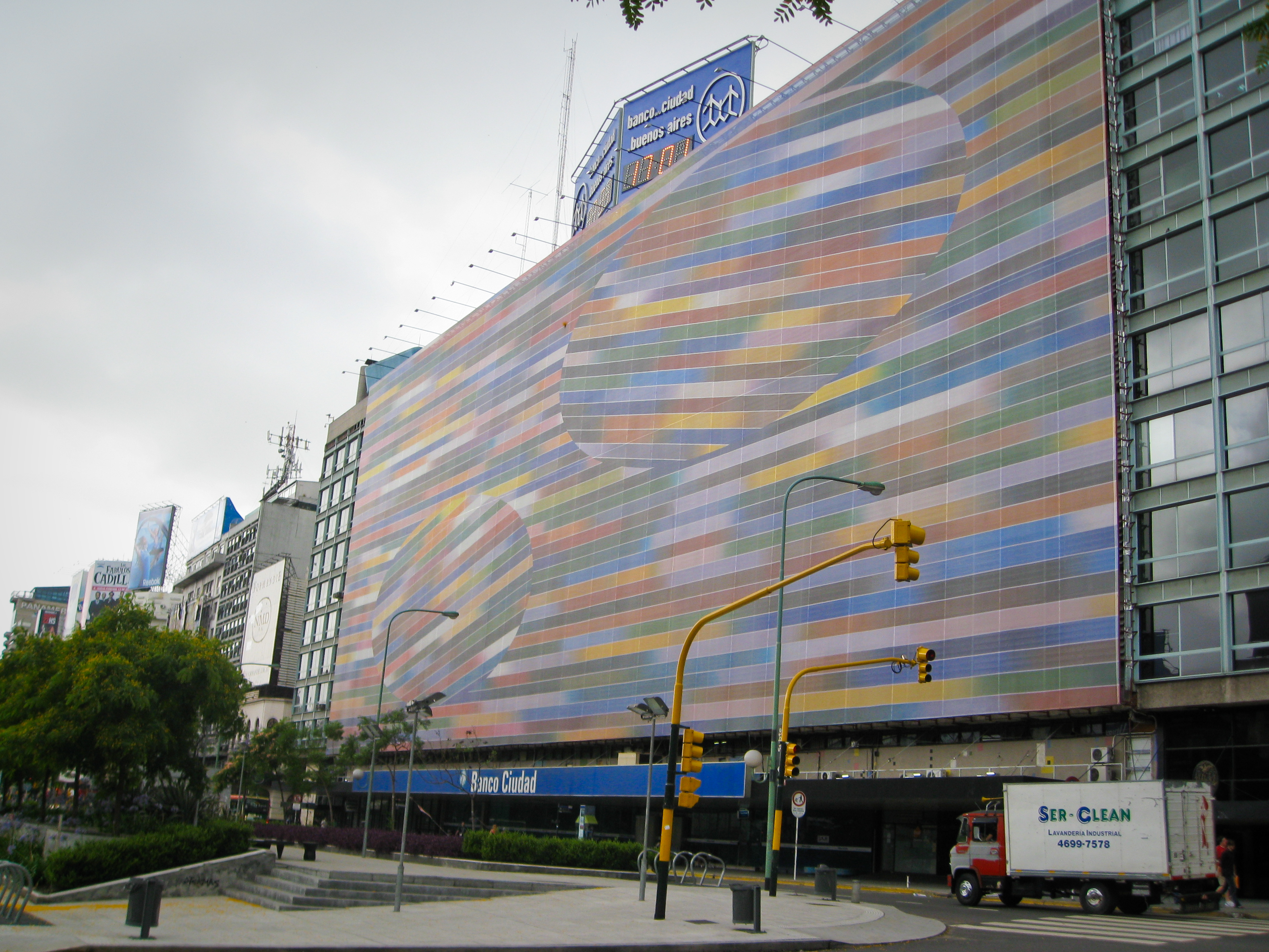
Ninth of July Avenue branch

The Bank of the City of Buenos Aires is the ninth-largest in Argentina by deposits, which in February 2010 totaled US$3.6 billion (3.6% of the domestic total), and its loan portfolio of US$2.8 billion made it the nation's eighth-largest lender; it maintained 61 branches, employing over 3,000 people.

=== Authorities ===
==== Bank of the city of Buenos Aires' Directory ====
The Directory is integrated by its president, Guillermo Laje, vice president, Fernando Jorge Elías, and general manager, Gustavo Jorge Cardoni.

==== Directors ====
The Directors are Delfina Rossi, Nicolás Massot, Gastón Rossi, Franco Moccia.

==== Syndic ====
The syndic of trustee is Paula Beatriz Villalba.

== Branches in Buenos Aires City ==
The bank has around fifty offices in all of Buenos Aires, some of them designed by MSGSSS studio in the 1960s, during the expansion at the end of the 1960s. They possess a representative aesthetic, with blue glass panes, metallic linings and white interiors, even though some offices keep the original appearance, with glass bricks on the front.

=== Headquarters ===
The current bank's head office was designed by MSGSSS studio in 1968. Since then, it has become a well-recognized architectural piece because of the extensive use of glass bricks as a construction material, the integral design of all its furniture, and the idea of building a bank with a glazed panel, open to the public on the pedestrian Florida St.

Located in a building that had been erected for a "A la Ciudad de México" store, on the corner of Florida and Sarmiento St., the structure was kept by the interior was totally remodeled, and display cases and marquees were open on the facade to showcase the items going up for auction and the bank activity to the walking public.

Between 1977 and 1981, an extension to the headquarters of the Bank of the City of Buenos Aires was built, with access through 630 Sarmiento St., today known as the "Centre Branch". This new access was commissioned to Aslan and Ezcurra architects, and consisted of a glazed tower with metal beams of seven underground levels, plus ground level and 18 floors.

In August 2016, the headquarters were re-inaugurated with an avant-garde remodeling, following the parameters outlined in its original construction. This re-inauguration had been planned in 2008 by the current president of the Central Bank, Federico Sturzenegger.

=== Esmeralda complex ===
A few blocks away, on 660 Esmeralda St., lies the Esmeralda complex, also known as the Sales Building, where the bank has been holding its public auctions since the 1930s. This building was also remodeled by MSGSSS in 1969, and it stands out because of its ramps and extensive counters with objects up four auction.

=== New Branch Project ===
In February 2010, the Bank of the City of Buenos Aires announced an architecture competition to design its new corporate office, in front of Parque Patricios, within the city's new Technological District.

For that purpose, the bank purchased a whole block between Uspallata, Atuel, Los Patos and Iguazú streets, which formerly belonged to the city's Institute of Housing. The winning proposal for the building would win the contract to erect it, so the studios competing had to be associated with contractors in order to present their projects.

In August 2010, the English Norman Foster and Partners won the competition, associated with the Argentinian designers Berdichevsky-Cherny y Edgardo Minond and CRIBA constructions. Their entire project would cost 200 million pesos, and would take 22 months to build.

Argentinian studios like Aisenson (second place), Richter-Dahl Rocha (third place), MSGSSS, Mario Roberto Álvarez and Associates, Antonini-Schön-Zemborain, Hampton-Rivoira, B4FS, Dujovne-Hirsch, Urgell-Penedo-Urgell, and the Uruguayan architect Rafael Viñoly also submitted their designs.

The construction started towards the end of 2010. The building was awarded in the 3rd Annual Awards for Excellence in Sustainability, organized by the American Planning Association, in the "Sustainable Building Project" category.

== History ==
=== Municipal Savings and Loans Bank ===
The board of directors first meeting after its establishment, on July 10, outlined the goal of "serving the working community, which is in the greatest need of such an institution."

The bank opened its doors in a Monserrat Ward residence that formerly belong to Viceroy Joaquin del Pino, it grew quickly and changed its name six times until it reached its current denomination. The first substantial change occurred in 1888 when, after the federalization of Buenos Aires, the bank was nationalized and transferred to the jurisdiction of the City of Buenos Aires. On September 30, 1904, through law 4351, the institution was called "Municipal Savings and Loans Bank".

Its new headquarters in the financial district were accompanied by new market capitalization, and it allowed it to provide personal, business and mortgage loans and payday advances. It soon began to administer pension funds and became a leading local source of underwriting of initial public offering activity on the Buenos Aires Stock Exchange, provincial and national government bonds, and foreign trade, as well. But the main change was that the bank was allowed to collect the public's deposits in Savings Accounts.

At first, it followed disappointing results, which increased investment in bank branches, agencies and other forms of representation, and led to the institution's renewed growth, particularly during the tenure of bank president Enrique Peña, who in 1916 committed the institution to "combat usury in the most effective possible way – making branches readily available throughout the city so as to lessen inconvenience to those who need our services."

=== Municipal Bank of Buenos Aires ===
A nationalist coup in 1943 led to the sudden advent of Col. Juan Perón as the new regime's chief policy-maker. The new government quickly made the control of price gouging in banking and public services a policy centerpiece, and in 1944, the bank was again re-chartered as the Municipal Bank of Buenos Aires, to give depositors more commercial banking options in Argentina's growing public sector.

The mass movements that appeared in Argentina since the forties integrated socially and politically urban classes derived from European immigration and rural inland workers, both of which became industrialized. This impacted on the evolution of the bank: social loans under a pledge had started to become a limited tool in a modernizing and growing country that converted its inhabitants into citizens. Municipal Bank had to expand its role then, as the new professionals and salaried employees required loans to buy and set up their own homes, and salesman and small industrial entrepreneurs needed to expand and modernize their facilities to keep up with the expanding internal market.

The bank became a leader in small business lending, and financed public housing projects in underprivileged areas. The city purchased a downtown lot on the massive Nueve de Julio Avenue (where the Mercado del Plata wholesaler stood) in 1947 for the construction of municipal offices, and an important branch was opened therein after the building's 1961 completion.

== First House B.A Credits ==
The First House B.A credit line is a response from the Bank of the City of Buenos Aires and the Instituto de Vivienda de la Ciudad (Institute of Housing of the City of Buenos Aires) to the housing problem in the city. This program offers mortgage credits with the lowest rate in the market, so people are able to choose and acquire their own homes, all through an objective and transparent allocation system.

The system gives a score to each applicant, and those people who reach a certain scoring are selected and notified through email, and given appointment to present their documentation in the Institute of Housing. Those people who do not make the cut are also informed of their situation via email, and are reminded they can register again the following month.

=== The conditions to purchase a house are ===
It has to be a single dwelling, for familiar use and permanent occupation.

The property must be worth up to $1.100.000 for applicants without children, and $1.300.000 with children.

The house cannot be a luxury residence, meaning the value cannot exceed the $27.000 per square meter. The appraisal will be performed by the Bank of the City of Buenos Aires.

Applicants can buy their property in the City of Buenos Aires as well as in the Great Buenos Aires, considered to be less than 100 km from the city limits.

=== Bank of the City of Buenos Aires ===
The bank's headquarters were moved to its current location, a refurbished Sarmiento and Florida Street building, on May 23, 1968, on the occasion of the 90th anniversary of its foundation. These and other new offices allowed the bank to expand its larger-scale commercial lending activities.

The relocation gave the bank the opportunity to create a new image with colored glazed bricks in large surfaces, both internal and external, as well as the creation of an advertising logo and the possibility to equip all of its offices and subsidiaries.

Its growing competition with the Bank of the Province of Buenos Aires led to the adoption of its current name, "Bank of the City of Buenos Aires", of May 16, 1972.

The bank risked being privatized during the nineties, but several political forces and the bank's own employees defended it, and so it managed to remain under the state's orbit.

After the modernization and cleanup process done over the last few years, the bank retook its social role, confirmed throughout its institutional history.
