= Siam Di Tella =

Argentine manufacturing company and brand

SIAM (Sección Industrial Amasadoras Mecánicas)
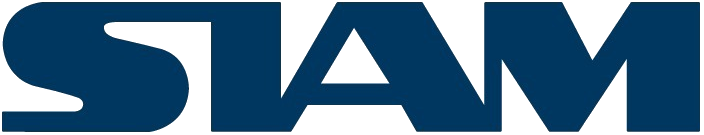

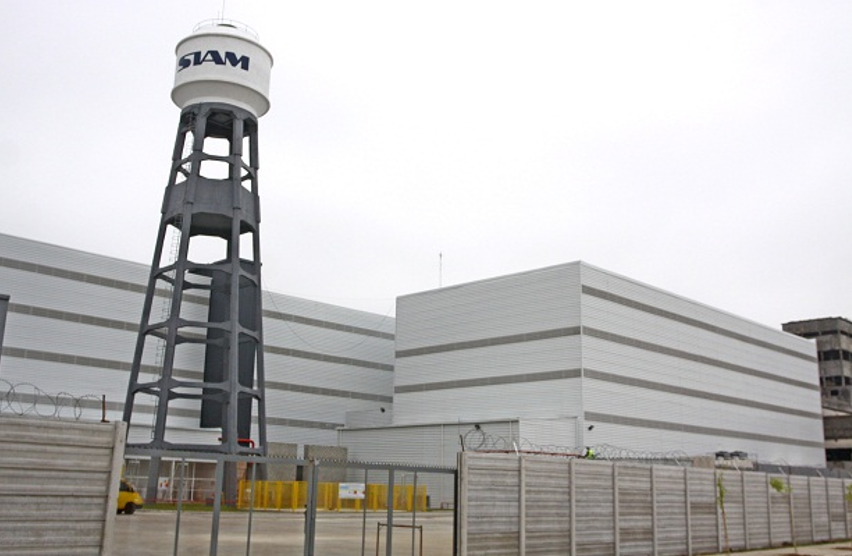
- SIAM plant in Piñeiro in April 2014
- Formerly: SIAM Di Tella
- Company type: Private
- Industry: Metalworking
- Founded: 1911
- Founder: Torcuato di Tella
- Defunct: 1981; 45 years ago
- Fate: Declared bankruptcy in 1981, assets sold. "SIAM" brand relaunched and original plant reopened in 2014
- Headquarters: Piñeiro, Buenos Aires, Argentina
- Key people: Luis Galli (Newsam CEO)
- Products: Bread machines; Refrigerators; Washing machines; Kitchens; Televisions; Scooters; Automobiles
- Owner: Newsan (2014–pres.)
- Website: siam.com.ar

SIAM (an acronym from Sección Industrial Amasadoras Mecánicas, formerly SIAM Di Tella) is an Argentine home appliance brand, currently owned by "Grupo Industrial Newsan", a leader of the segment in the region. The original "Siam Di Tella" company was founded in Buenos Aires by Torcuato di Tella in 1911, established as a manufacturer of mechanical bread machines. Subsequently, production was diversified by incorporating the production of refrigerators, washing machines, kitchens, televisions, scooters, vans, automobiles, and elements for private industry and the public sector, such as oil pumping equipment, large electrical transformers, steel pipes and generators for diesel-electric locomotives. By the 1940s, the company became the largest metalworking industry in South America.

The company was nationalized in 1972 and in 1986, during the government of Raúl Alfonsín, it was dismantled and sold separately to three private business groups (Techint, Pérez Companc and Aurora). After securing rights to the "SIAM" brand name, Newsan reopened the former Siam Di Tella plant in Piñeiro, Buenos Aires on 30 April 2014, with an investment of more than USD35 million.

Currently, Newsan (a company with more than 3,500 employees and licensee of Sanyo, Philco, and other electronics companies) manufactures refrigerators with the "SIAM" brand in the Piñeiro plant.

== History ==
=== Early years and development ===
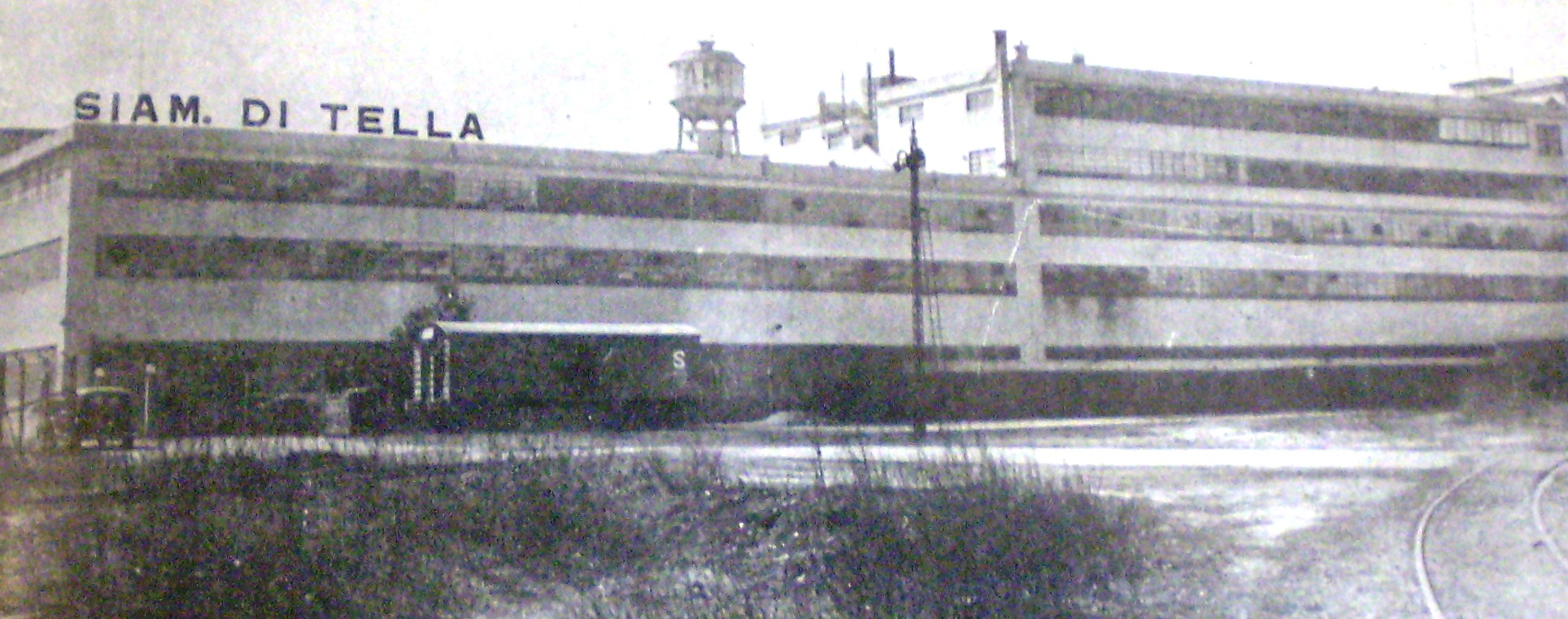
The Siam di Tella facility in Piñeiro, south of Buenos Aires, c. 1966

Founded in 1911 by Torcuato di Tella, an Italian Argentine immigrant, the firm began as a manufacturer of bread making machines, which came into great demand by local bakeries in the 1920s. Di Tella's friendship with Enrique Mosconi, the director of the newly established state oil concern YPF, helped result in a contract to build their fuel dispensers and Siam di Tella's growth into a leading Argentine manufacturer.

A military coup in 1930 resulted in the contract's rescission, prompting di Tella to convert his new factory south of Buenos Aires into the manufacture of industrial machinery and home appliances (particularly refrigerators), becoming the largest, domestically based industrial conglomerate in Latin America. The firm established a facility making commercial freezers under license from Westinghouse in 1935, and their trademark household refrigerator unit in 1948. Advertised as la reina del frío ("The Queen of Cold"), these became popular among Argentine consumers and their production expanded from 11,000 units annually in 1948 to 70,000 by 1958. Expanding into an array of big ticket appliances, as well as their motorcycle and motor vehicle ventures, Siam diTella expanded to 13 manufacturing facilities employing 9,000 by the 1960s.

=== Siambretta ===
Following the founder's death in 1948, the firm secured a licensing agreement with Italian motor scooter maker Lambretta. This initially consisted of a deal to import 2,000 obsolete model A's that had failed to sell in Italy, 75 of which were donated to President Juan Perón's youth group UES. Contemporary LD models were soon added to the range and in the early 1960s SIAM began producing an Li/TV Series 2 variant. Some of these were exported to Chile and Uruguay. Siambretta production ceased by 1970 with around 200,000 units having been sold.

=== Automobile production ===
SIAM automobiles
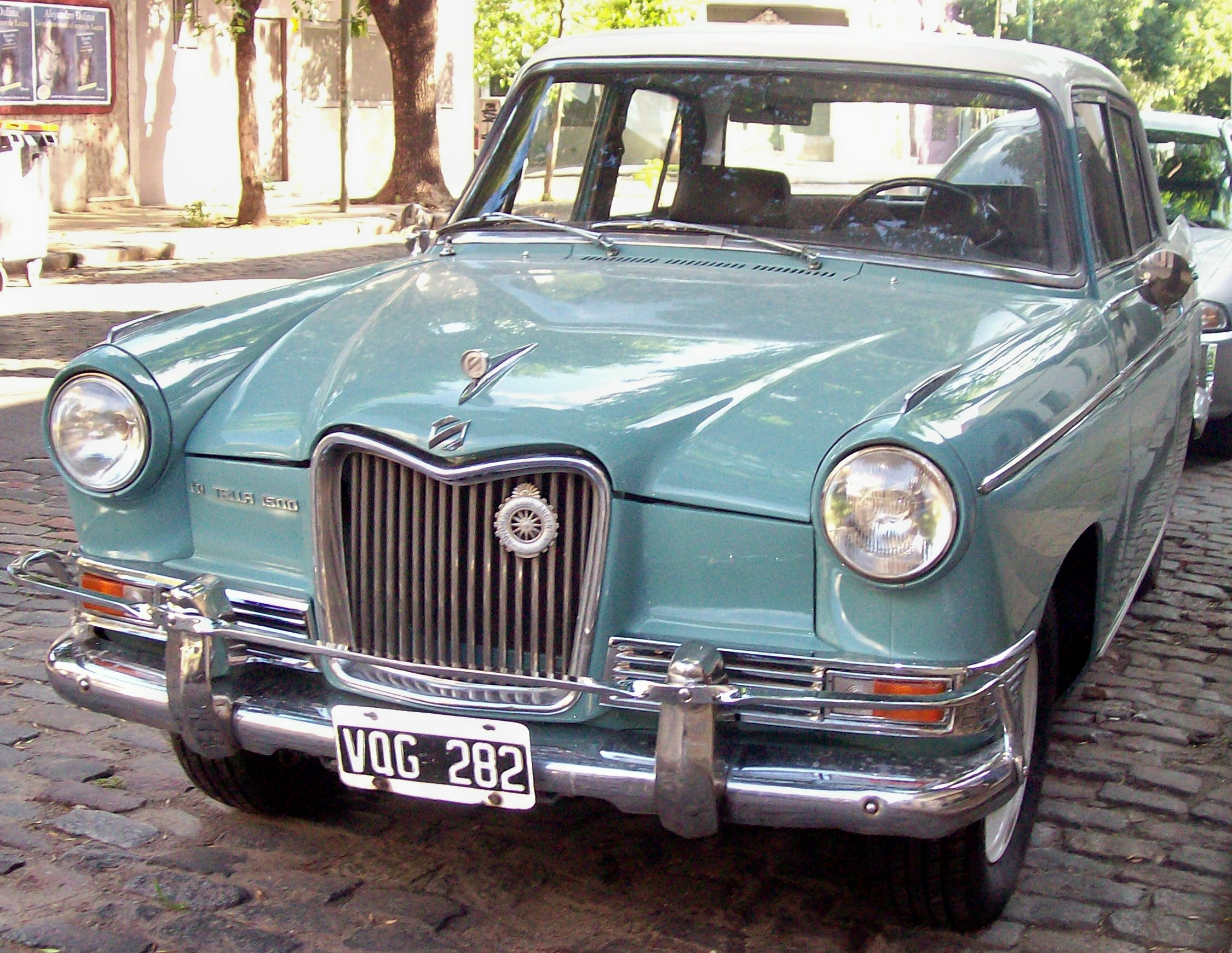
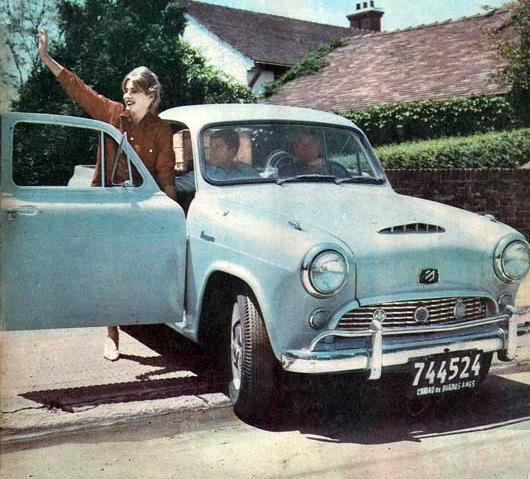
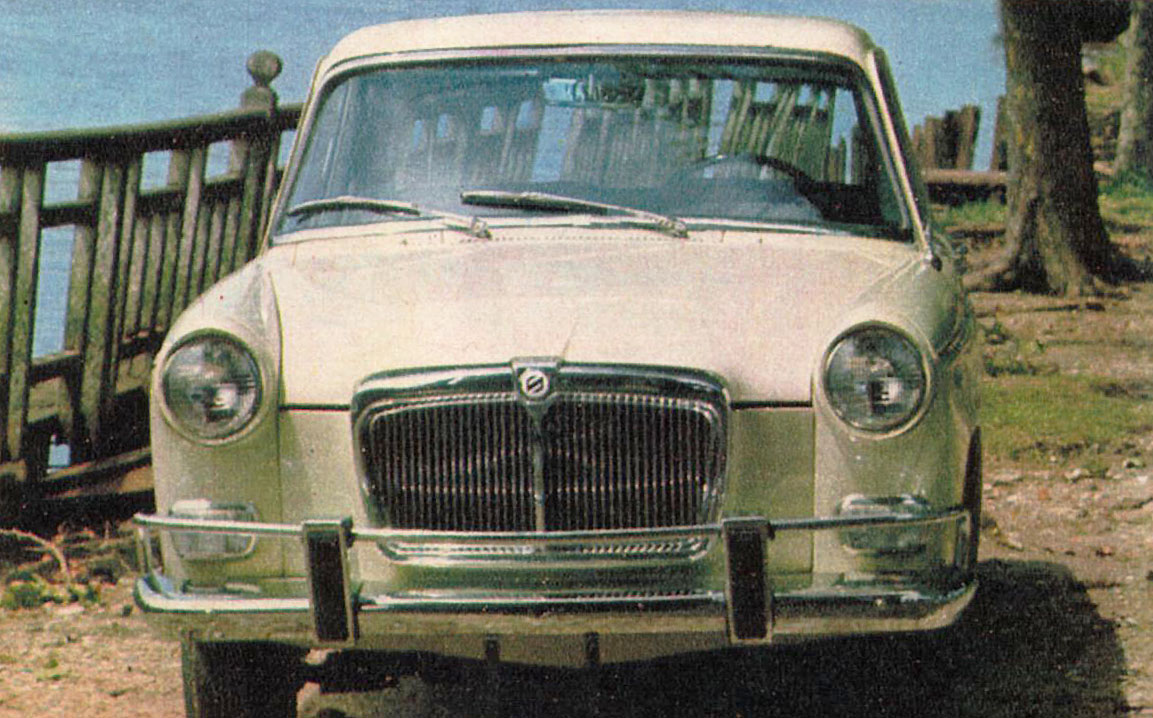
(Above): SIAM Di Tella 1500; (center): SIAM Di Tella Argenta first series; (below): SIAM Magnette 1622

Reforms by way of a Law of Foreign Investment and an Automobile Industry Framework drafted by adviser Rogelio Julio Frigerio and enacted by President Arturo Frondizi encouraged Siam to venture into the auto industry. A license obtained from the British Motor Corporation led to the Siam di Tella 1500; based on the British BMC Farina series of the late 1950s, using the front-end design of the Riley model. The car followed the specifications of the BMC car in most respects, but was fitted with a low compression version of the 1489 cc B-Series engine with a single carburettor (the option of twin carburettors was offered, but very rarely specified).

The vehicle became very popular among taxi drivers in Buenos Aires due to its spacious interior and its fuel economy compared to the US-derived vehicles previously popular as taxis. The 1500 was followed by the Traveller station wagon and the Argenta pick-up truck, then the upmarket "Magnette". The proliferation of domestic subsidiaries of U.S. and European automakers led to the bankruptcy of Siam's vehicle line in 1966; in all, around 61,477 units had been produced between 1959 and 1966. The automobile production facility was sold to Industrias Kaiser Argentina. IKA revitalised production with a variant of the Morris Oxford sold with two-tone leather seats and 1622cc engine as the Morris 1650; the base model Siam di Tella 1500 and the Argenta pick-up were rebadged Riley 1500 and the Magnette was uprated with twin carburettors and individual leather seats as the MG 1650 - sales of the Morris were good, but IKA was taken over by Renault in 1967 and production of this British-derived range of cars was shut down.

=== Production figures ===
Name	Type	Production	Units
Di Tella 1500	Sedan	1959–66	45,785
Di Tella Traveller	Station wagon	1963–66	1,915
Siam Magnette 1622	Sedan	1964–66	2,664
Di Tella Argenta (1st. series)	Pickup	1961–63	
Di Tella Argenta (2nd. series)	Pickup	1963–66	11,113
Total produced			61,477

=== Electromechanics division ===
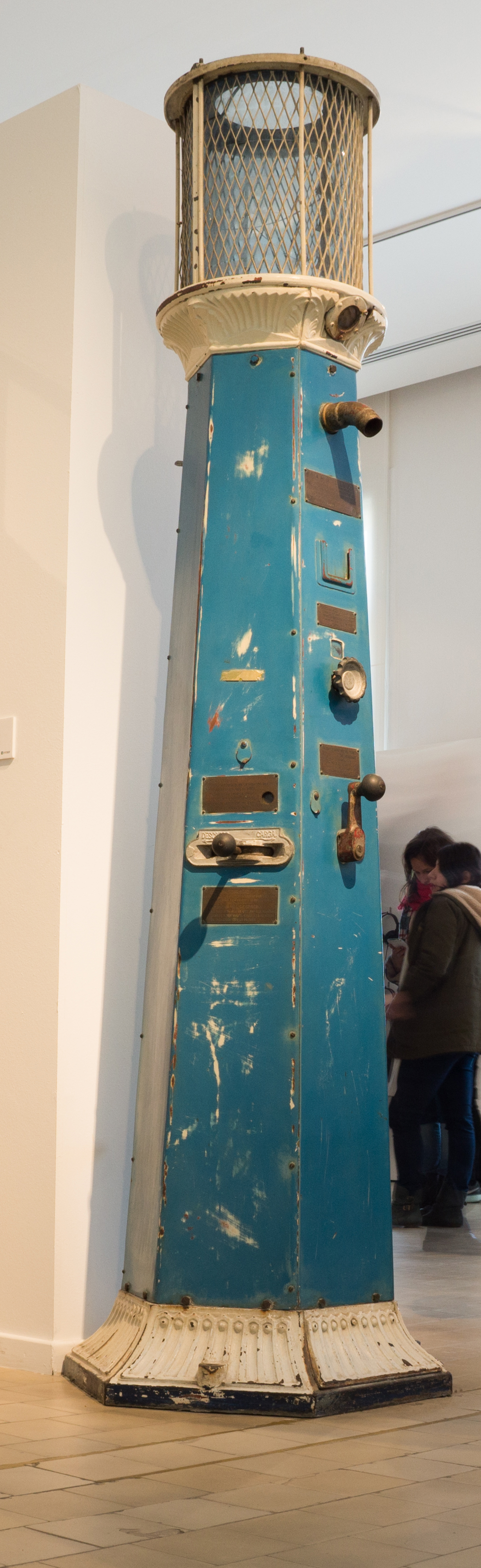
SIAM gasoline pump

In the late 1960s, the Electromechanical section of SIAM signed two contracts, which would ultimately allow it to produce heavy machinery in the country. The first, with the US company WABCO (Westinghouse Air Brake CO), for the production of three models of WABCO motor graders at its Monte Chingolo plant: these were 440, 444 and 660.

This contract was in force until the mid-80's, where, since 1984, SADE (Sociedad Argentina de Electrificación) took over the production of 130 H and 160 H motor graders under the SIAM SADE brand until the decade Of 90 '.

The second was with the International Harvester, for the production of the front loader IH Payloader H60B, which extended until the end of the 1970s.

=== Decline and reactivation ===
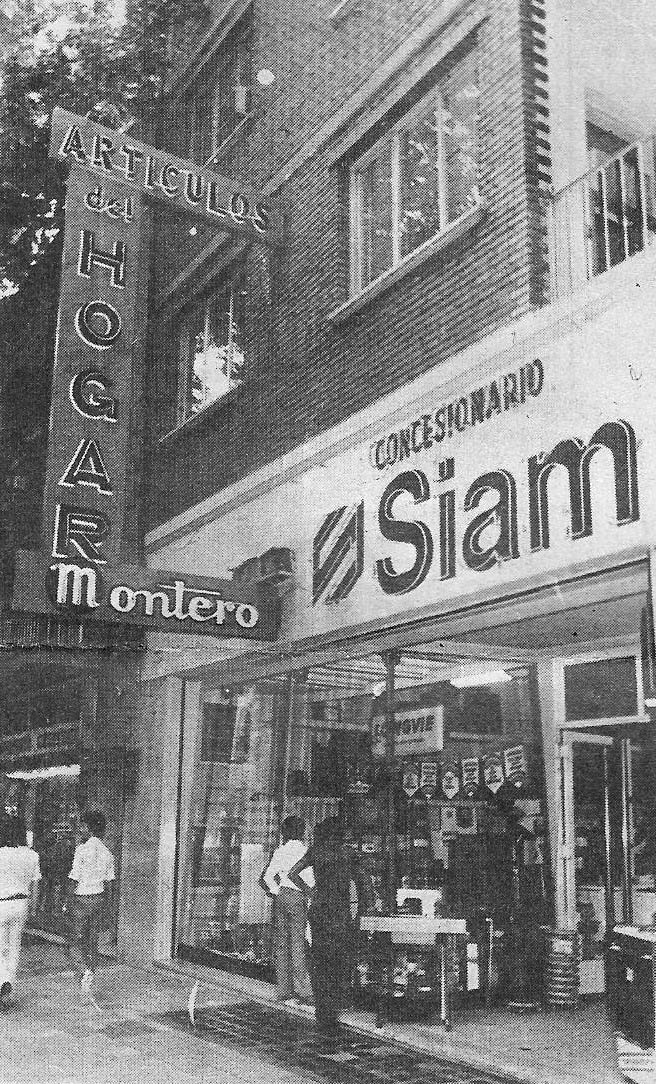
SIAM shop in Mendoza, 1979

Siam Di Tella focused on its appliance and machinery units, though losses stemming from its defunct vehicle unit led to growing debts with the state small business lender, BANADE. Paying the lender with company stock in lieu of cash, Siam gradually made the Argentine government its partner. The latter absorbed Siam in 1972, after which the firm expanded into foreign markets through exports of its refrigerators, and into the transformer industry. The March 1976 coup and the free trade and deregulatory policies enacted by the last dictatorship's Economy Minister, José Alfredo Martínez de Hoz, affected the company adversely, however.

Unable to compete with a flood of imported appliances in the late 1970s and beset by a national financial collapse in the early 1980s, Siam di Tella declared bankruptcy in 1981 and its facilities were sold by the National Government in 1986. The steel tube facility was sold to Techint, and their remaining appliance units to the Pérez Companc conglomerate and local appliance and electronics maker Aurora; another small appliance and parts facility in Monte Chingolo was acquired by Newsan in a joint venture with Sanyo in 1991. A renewed boom in imports ultimately led to the bankruptcy of Aurora in 1997.

The remaining employees formed the Julián Moreno CIAM Cooperative, Ltd. in 1997. They resumed the manufacture of appliances at the Piñeyro facility in 2002 and employ around 200 production workers. Newsan, which had reinaugurated Aurora's Ushuaia facility in 2011, announced the reintroduction of the popular SIAM refrigerator line in 2012. The SIAM refrigerator plant was reopened on May 1, 2014, in a ceremony led by Newsan Chairman Rubén Chernajovsky and Argentine President Cristina Fernández de Kirchner; the new plant has a capacity of 100,000 units annually.

== Legacy ==
Torcuato Salvador di Tella, the founder's eldest son, set aside 10% of the company's stock to establish the Torcuato di Tella Institute in 1958. Located on Buenos Aires' Florida Street during its heyday in the 1960s, the institute became the leading Argentine venue for avant-garde art and experimental theatre. The center closed in 1971, but reopened in the Belgrano neighborhood in 2007; the Torcuato di Tella University, established in 1991, is located nearby.

The Siambretta tooling was sold to a firm called 'Franco Brothers' who used it to produce a three-wheeled truck called the Frambretta. Low-scale production of this has continued into the 21st century.

The Cambridge-Oxford Owners Club is an international owners club for the Siam Di Tella 1500 and Magnette models, as well as Di Tella commercial vehicles and their British-built four- and six-cylinder counterparts. The club provides technical advice, spare parts information, and opportunities for members to exchange information about the vehicles.

== See also ==
- British Motor Corporation
- Universidad Torcuato Di Tella
- Torcuato di Tella Institute
