= Nicolás Massot =

Argentine politician

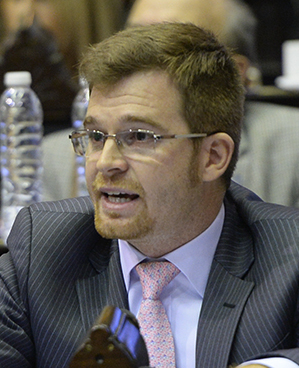

National Deputy
- Incumbent
- Assumed office 10 December 2023
- Constituency: Buenos Aires
- In office 10 December 2015 – 10 December 2019
- Constituency: Córdoba

Personal details
- Born: 16 July 1984 (age 42) Bahía Blanca, Argentina
- Party: Republican Proposal
- Other political affiliations: Juntos por el Cambio (2015–2023)
- Education: Torcuato di Tella University

Nicolás María Massot (born 16 July 1984) is an Argentine politician and economist. He currently serves as Director of Banco Ciudad de Buenos Aires, Argentina's third-largest public bank. He was a member of the Argentine Chamber of Deputies (lower house of the Argentine legislature) from 2015 to 2019.

== Career ==
He began his career as the General Director of Political and Institutional Reform under then-president Cristina Fernández de Kirchner. He served in that role until de Krichner's 2015 term ended. He then was elected a Deputy of the Argentine Nation for the Province of Córdoba, serving from December 2015 through December 2019. During his time in the legislature, he replaced Federico Pinedo as President of the Legislative Bloc of the PRO, after the later resigned to take a seat in the senate.

He has also worked for Argentina's Ministry of the Interior.

Massot has been married to Chiara Comoretto since 2017. The couple met in Argentina's National Congress. He received a degree in economics from the Universidad Torcuato di Tella.

Massot is currently preparing to contest the 2023 mayoral race in Tigre, where he has lived and served with the military for two years.

== Honors ==
In 2019, Massot was named one of Yale University's World Fellows.
