= Piñeiro, Buenos Aires =

Town in Buenos Aires Province, Argentina

Piñeiro
- Town
- Location in Buenos Aires province Piñeiro (Argentina)
- Coordinates: 34°40′11″S 58°23′19″W
- Country: Argentina
- Province: Buenos Aires
- Partido: Avellaneda
- Founded: 19 April 1893
- Elevation: 32 m (105 ft)

Population (2001 census [INDEC])
  - Total: 26,979
- CPA Base: B 1870
- Area code: +54 11

Piñeiro is a town in Avellaneda Partido of Buenos Aires Province, Argentina. It forms part of the urban agglomeration of Greater Buenos Aires.
