= Guido di Tella =

Argentine businessman, academic and diplomat

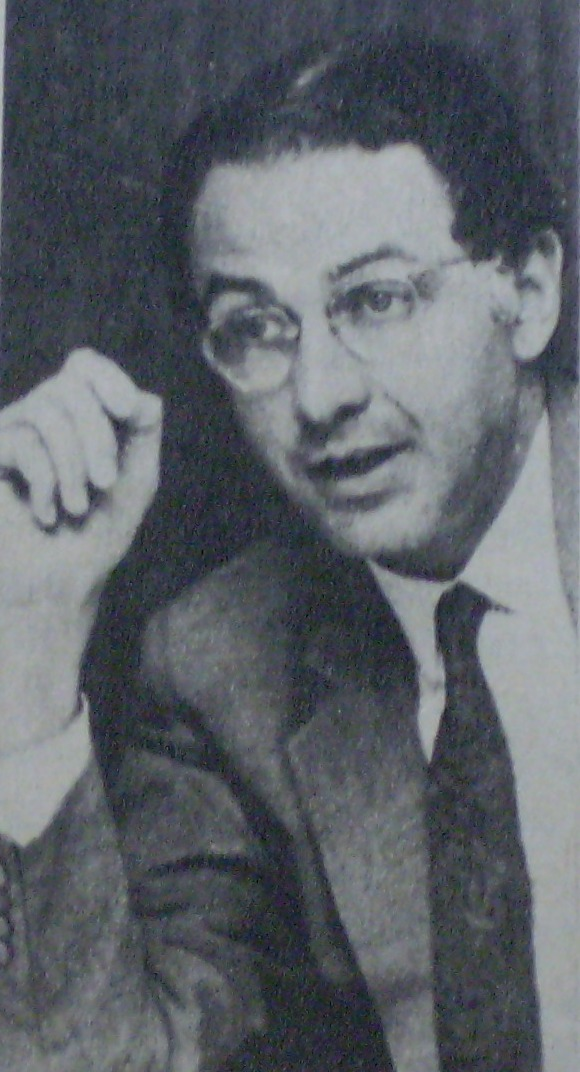

Minister of Foreign Affairs of Argentina
- In office January 31, 1991 – December 10, 1999
- President: Carlos Menem
- Preceded by: Domingo Cavallo
- Succeeded by: Adalberto Rodríguez Giavarini

Personal details
- Born: Guido José Mario Di Tella; June 12, 1931 Buenos Aires, Argentina
- Died: December 31, 2001 (aged 70) Buenos Aires, Argentina
- Party: Justicialist Party (1955-2001) Christian Democratic Party (1954-1955)
- Spouse: Nelly Ruvira
- Education: University of Buenos Aires; Massachusetts Institute of Technology

Guido di Tella (June 12, 1931 – December 31, 2001) was an Argentine businessman, academic and diplomat who served as minister of foreign affairs.

== Life and times ==
Guido José Mario di Tella was born in Buenos Aires in 1931. His father, Torcuato di Tella, was an Italian Argentine industrialist who founded Siam di Tella, a company that manufactured industrial machinery and household appliances.

== Early career ==
Guido lost his father at age 17 and, following his father's wishes, studied engineering at the University of Buenos Aires with the aim of managing the family business, which employed around 5,000 people. He became involved in politics and co-founded the Christian Democratic Party of Argentina in 1954. After graduating in 1955, he pursued a PhD in economics at the Massachusetts Institute of Technology, completing it in 1959. He married Nelly Ruvira, and they had five children.

After returning to Argentina, he co-founded the Torcuato di Tella Institute with his brother Torcuato, establishing it as an educational and cultural foundation. By this time, Guido di Tella had become a supporter of Peronism, an uncommon stance among members of Argentina's upper class. He believed that overcoming class-based prejudice against the largely working-class Peronist movement was necessary for Argentina to become, in his words, a “serious country.” He taught at the University of Buenos Aires and the Catholic University of Argentina, and helped develop the Di Tella Institute into a major supporter of avant-garde art in Argentina during the 1960s. His continued support for Perón led to a brief expulsion from Argentina in the early 1970s. During this period, he was a visiting fellow at St Antony's College, Oxford.

Di Tella was part of Juan Perón's entourage during his brief visit to Argentina in November 1972, which was permitted in advance of the 1973 general elections. After Juan Perón's death in July 1974, his widow and successor, Isabel Perón, appointed Di Tella as deputy economy minister. He held the position until the military coup in March 1976. Following the coup, he spent several years in exile in Oxford, where he wrote a book about his experiences. Although he returned to Argentina in 1989, he maintained ties to Oxford, keeping a residence there and visiting annually.

== Foreign minister ==
Following Carlos Menem's election as president in 1989, Di Tella was appointed deputy economy minister under Miguel Roig. After Roig's death shortly thereafter, Di Tella became ambassador to the United States. A cabinet reshuffle in February 1991 led to his appointment as foreign minister, succeeding Domingo Cavallo, who became economy minister. By this time, Argentina had already begun restoring diplomatic ties with the United Kingdom and strengthening relations with the United States. Diplomatic relations with the UK were reestablished in February 1990, and Argentina had participated in the Gulf War.

However, Argentina also had a long tradition of voting against the U.S. at the United Nations, and for years was an active member of the Non-aligned Movement. Di Tella carried out Menem's realignment of Argentine foreign policy towards the "Washington Consensus," outlining a new U.S.-Argentine entente the Foreign Minister famously described as "carnal relations." Di Tella's efforts also led to a 1997 decision by U.S. President Bill Clinton to designate Argentina a major non-NATO ally.

He also worked to strengthen relations with the United Kingdom, and in November 1991 signed commercial cooperation agreements on the Exclusive Economic Zone around the Falkland Islands with British Foreign Secretary Douglas Hurd. His outreach efforts toward Falkland Islands residents, including personally signed annual postcards, had limited success. However, they contributed to a more favorable view of Argentina among some islanders, who saw him as the first Argentine politician to acknowledge that any resolution would require consultation with the island's population.

== Later life ==
Di Tella retired from public service with the change of administrations in December 1999, on which occasion he was made an honorary fellow of St. Antony's (a rare distinction). He visited the Falkland Islands as an ordinary citizen (a concession he had obtained for Argentine nationals while Foreign Minister), in October 2000, and was warmly received.

Illness forced di Tella to retire from politics, however, and 2001 was marked by an investigation into his possible role in the illegal, Menem-era sale of arms to Croatia and Ecuador (each embroiled in wars, at the time); he maintained his innocence, and was eventually spared further trial because of his ill health. Secluded in his estancia outside Navarro, Buenos Aires, di Tella suffered a stroke on New Year's Eve, 2001, dying at age 70. He was survived by his widow, Nelly, and his five children.

== See also ==
- Government of Argentina
- Military coups in Argentina
- Politics of Argentina
