= YPF =

Argentine energy company

YPF S.A.

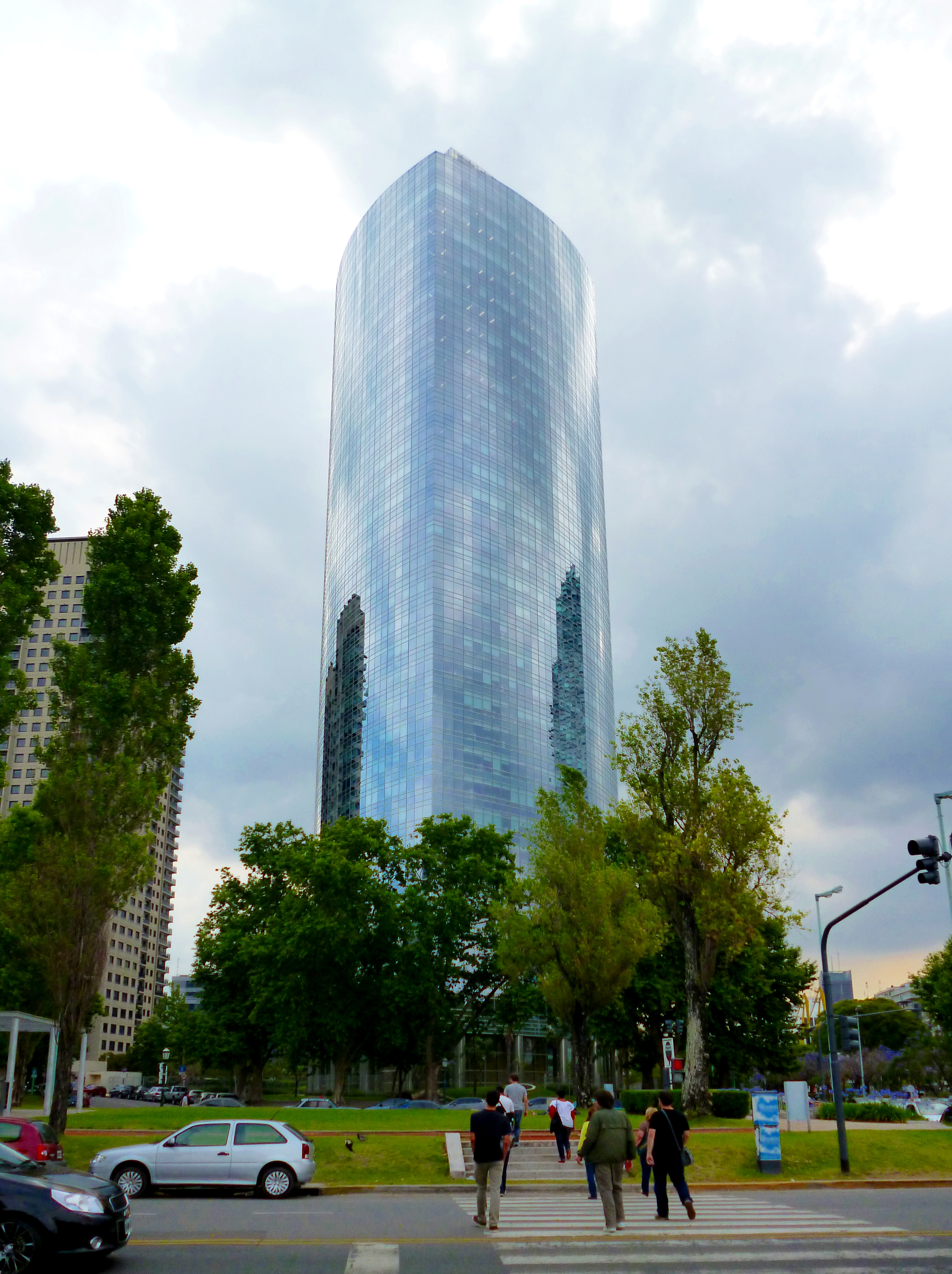
- YPF Tower in Puerto Madero, 2010
- Type: Sociedad Anónima
- Traded as: BCBA: YPFD; NYSE: YPF; MERVAL component
- Industry: Petroleum and natural gas
- Founded: June 3, 1922; 104 years ago
- Founder: Government of Argentina (Hipólito Yrigoyen's administration)
- Headquarters: Buenos Aires, Argentina
- Area served: Argentina
- Key people: Horacio Daniel Marín (president)
- Products: Petroleum; Natural gas Petrochemicals
- Services: Fuel stations LNG transportation Oil refining
- Revenue: ▲US$18.75 billion (2022)
- Net income: ▲US$2.23 billion (2022)
- Total assets: US$25.9 billion (2022)
- Owner: Government of Argentina (51%)
- Number of employees: 23,471
- Parent: Secretary of Energy
- Website: ypf.com

YPF S.A. (Spanish pronunciation: ['i 'pe 'efe], formerly Yacimientos Petrolíferos Fiscales; English: "Fiscal Oilfields") is a vertically integrated, majority state-owned Argentine energy company, engaged in oil and gas exploration and production, and the transportation, refining, and marketing of gas and petroleum products. In the 2020 Forbes Global 2000, YPF was ranked as the 1360th largest public company in the world.

Founded in 1922 under President Hipólito Yrigoyen's administration, YPF was the first oil company established as a state enterprise outside of the Soviet Union, and the first state oil company to become vertically integrated.

YPF's first director was Enrique Mosconi, who took up his charge in 1922, remaining there until 1930. During his run on the company, Mosconi advocated economic independence and starting in 1928, nationalization of oil supplies; the latter, however, was never achieved due to a 1930 military coup against Yrigoyen backed by, among others, foreign oil interests.

YPF was privatized under president Carlos Menem and was bought by the Spanish firm Repsol in 1999; the resulting merged company was called Repsol YPF.

The renationalization of 51% of the firm was initiated in 2012 by President Cristina Fernández de Kirchner. The government of Argentina eventually agreed to pay $5 billion compensation to Repsol.

== History ==
=== Early development ===
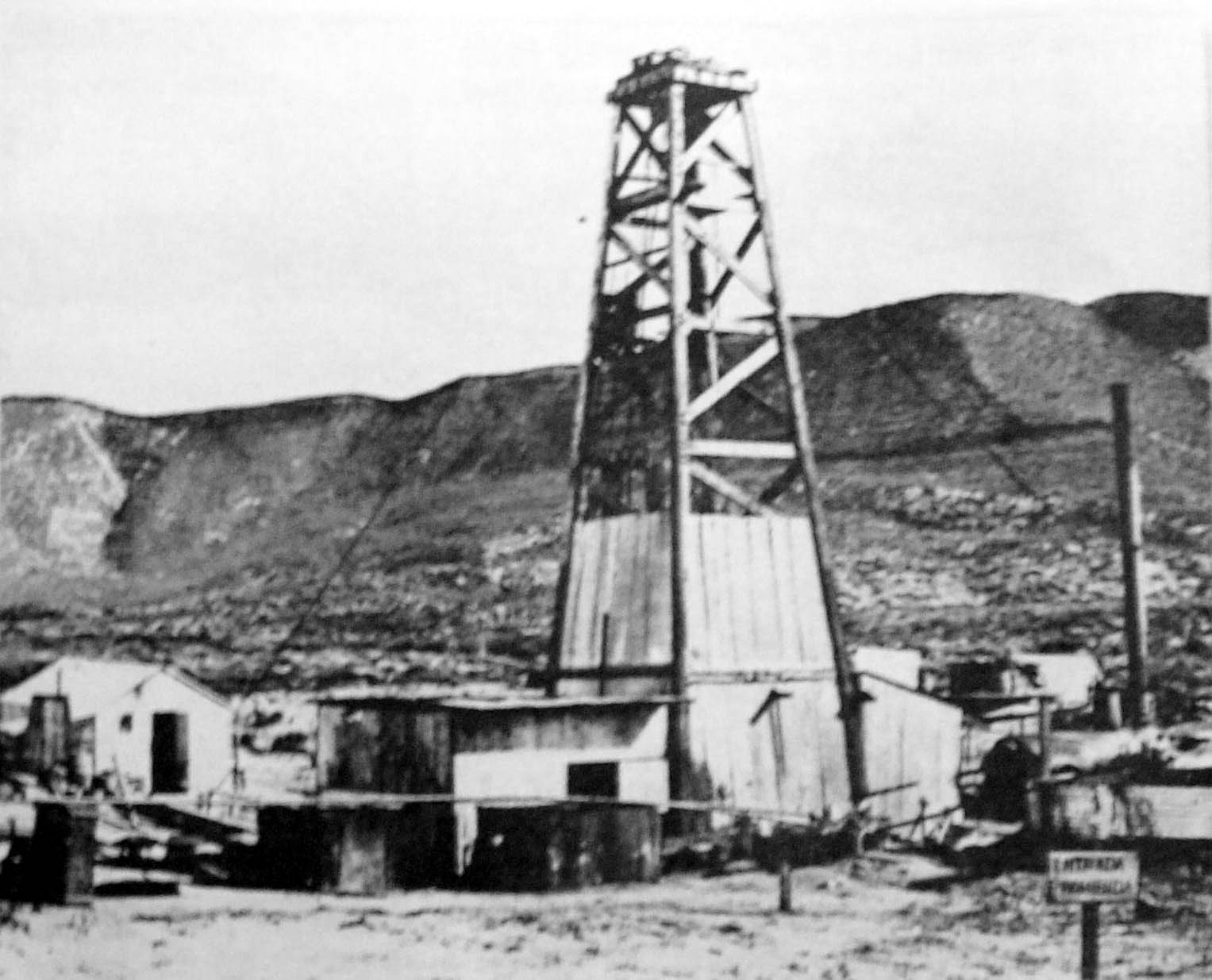
First oil well in Comodoro Rivadavia, 1907

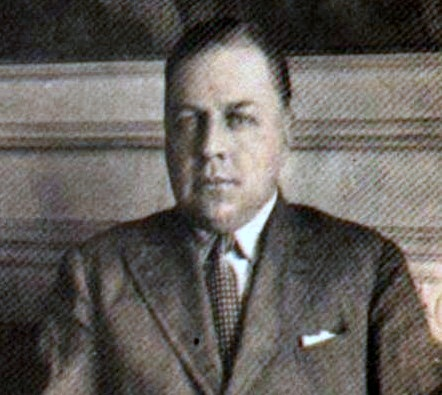
General Enrique Mosconi, on whose initiative YPF was founded

The company, specializing in the exploration, production, refining and commercialization of petroleum, had its origin in 1907, when oil was discovered near the city of Comodoro Rivadavia in Chubut. Following World War I, oil had become an important resource, leading to struggles between rival powers to gain control of it.

YPF was created by President of Argentina Hipólito Yrigoyen on 3 June 1922. It was the first entirely state-run oil company in the world, the second being the French Total founded in 1924 by the conservative Prime Minister Raymond Poincaré. YPF's creation was followed by the creation of ANCAP in Uruguay (1931), YPFB in Bolivia (1936), Pemex in Mexico (1938), ENAP in Chile (1950), and Petrobras in Brazil (1953). Mosconi served as YPF's first director.

YPF bought its first tanker in the United States in 1923, and built not only several extracting facilities, but whole towns and cities, such as Comodoro Rivadavia; Caleta Olivia in Santa Cruz; Plaza Huincul in Neuquén; and General Mosconi in Salta. Bolstered by production in Comodoro Rivadavia, the firm produced 2.2 million barrels in its first year of operation (1922); this represented over three-quarters of domestic production and nearly a fourth of Argentina's oil consumption that year. Contracts signed in 1923 with Bethlehem Steel allowed YPF to begin the production of gasoline and kerosene.

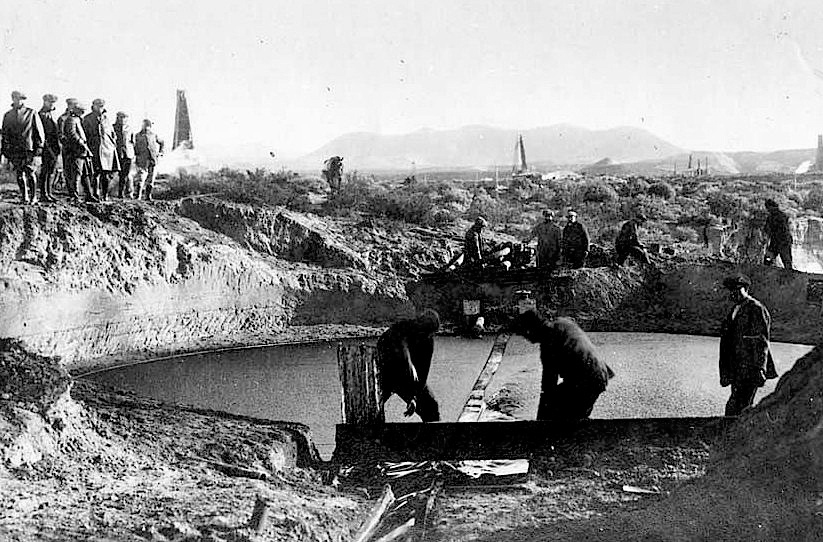
Group of YPF workers at an oil well in Chubut, 1923

Mosconi, who had previously been in charge of the Aeronautics division of the Army, proposed to Joaquín Corvalán, governor of Salta Province, the exploitation of Salta's oil by YPF, offering 13% royalties for the province. Corvalán, allied with the Standard Oil of New Jersey, rejected Mosconi's proposal, however, referring to the concept of "provincial autonomy". This refusal led Mosconi to evolve in favor of the nationalization of oil supplies in order to strengthen Argentina's independence.

The first YPF oil refinery was inaugurated in December 1925 in La Plata, and was at the time the tenth largest in the world. According to Mosconi, this spawned the beginning of "the mobilization of all sort of resistance and obstacles" from the oil trusts, in particular from Standard Oil, which was one of the most influential foreign companies in Argentina, with a presence in Comodoro Rivadavia, Jujuy, and Salta.

The Chamber of Deputies approved a law on 28 September 1928, establishing a state monopoly on oil. The monopoly, however, was not absolute, being limited to oil exploration, exploitation and transport, but excluding selling and imports. Private firms opposed themselves to the law project, refusing to pay a 10% royalty. The bill was supported by President Marcelo Torcuato de Alvear but was ultimately blocked by the conservatives in the Senate.

Oil nationalization became an important theme of Yrigoyen's electoral campaign of 1928, although the Yrigoyenistas focused their criticism on Standard Oil of New Jersey, abstaining themselves from attacking British Empire interests, to which Argentina's economy was closely linked (in particular Royal Dutch Shell).

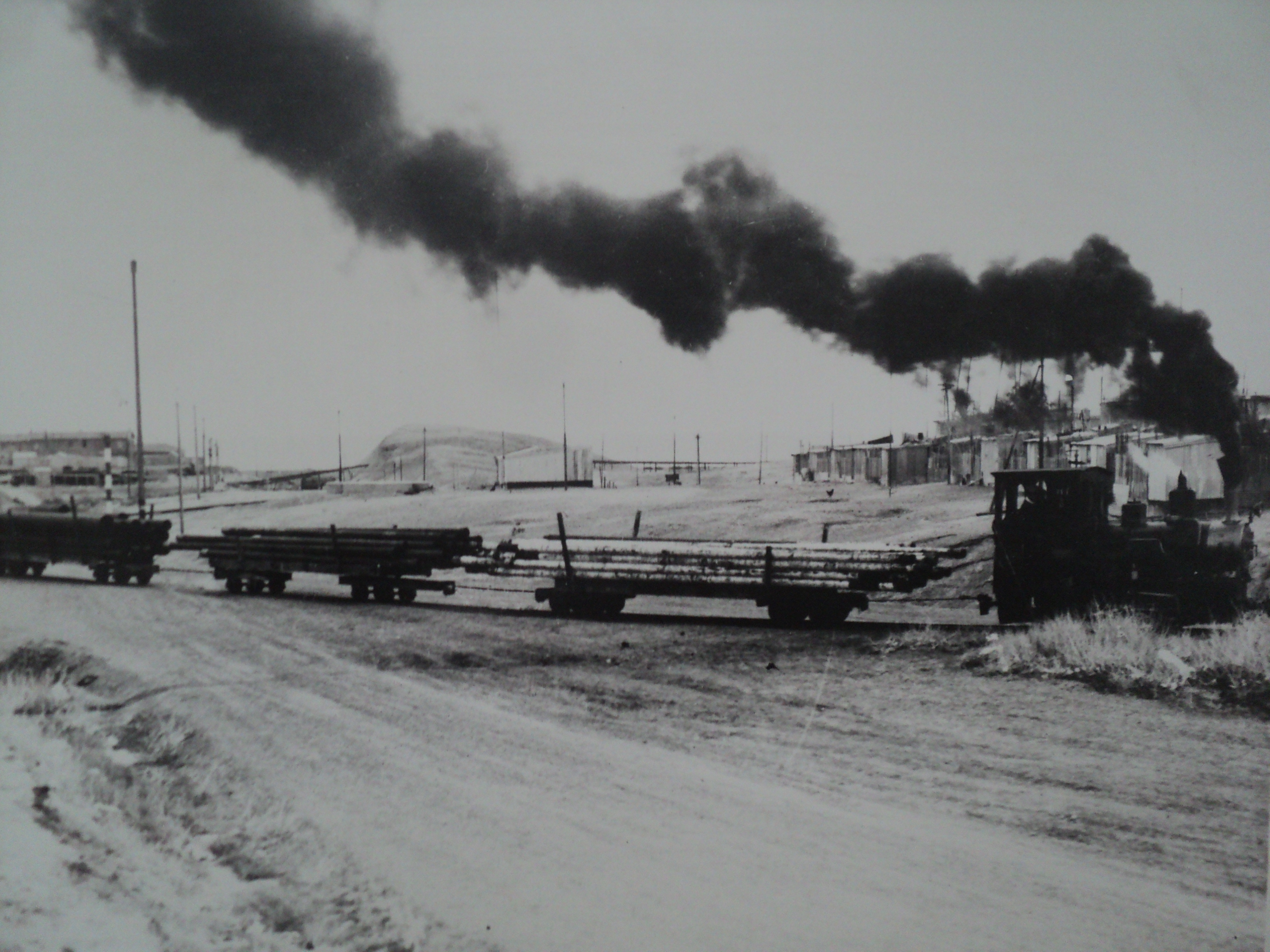
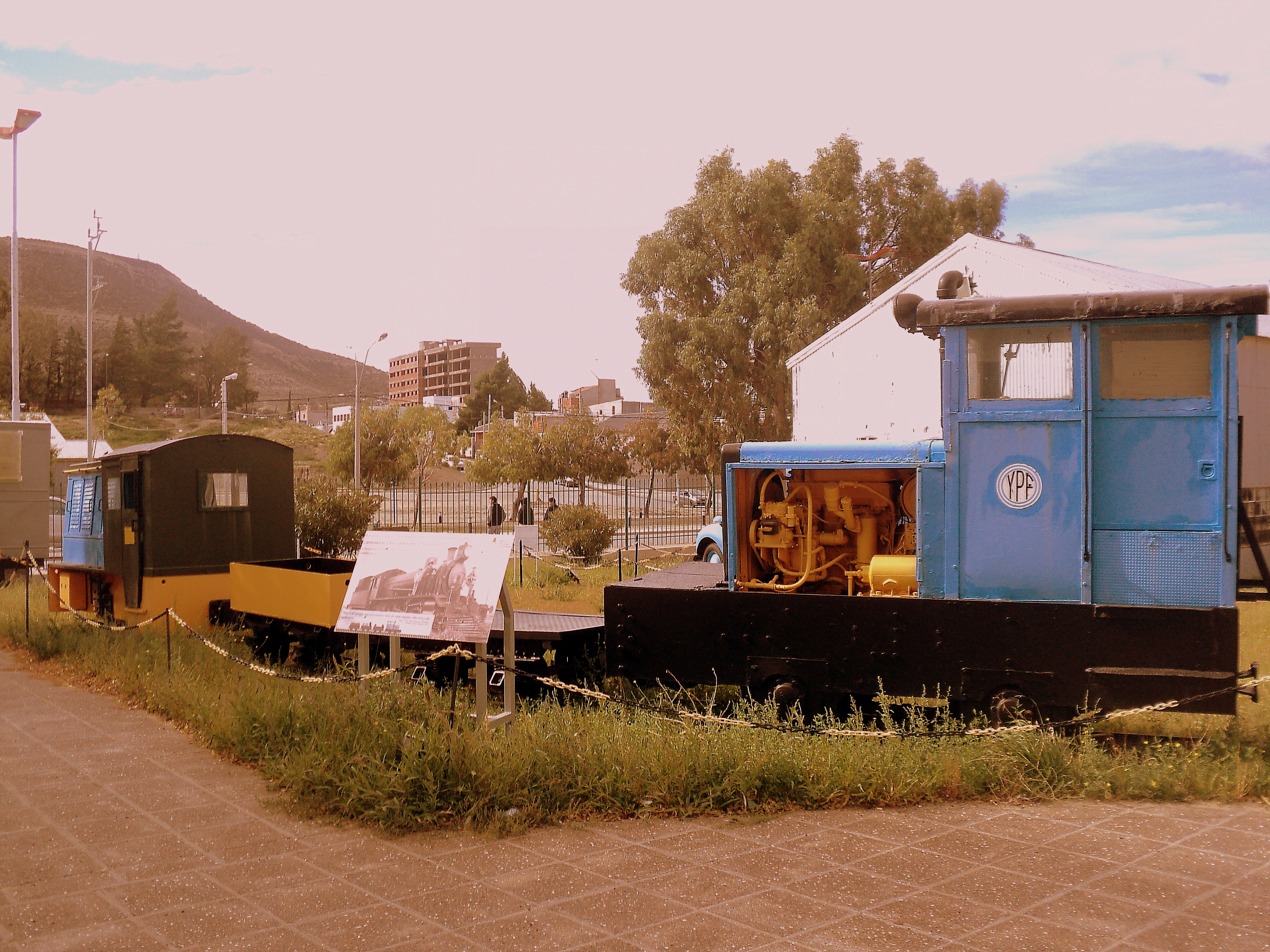
The Comodoro Rivadavia Railway joined oil wells of the region until its closure in 1978. Left: an YPF's freight train crossing the Km. 3 district in Comodoro Rivadavia; right: a train exhibited at the Petroleum Museum in 2013

Following Yrigoyen's victory in the 1928 elections, YPF, still directed by Enrique Mosconi, reduced oil prices in May 1929, leading to the cheapest petroleum in the world and to an important increase in YPF's sales compared to its rival private companies, forcing them to also lower their prices. Mosconi also reduced the price of kerosene and agrochemicals to contribute to the development of the interior regions of Argentina. YPF produced 5.5 million barrels by 1929, and though its share of domestic output had declined to 58% (from 77% in 1923) amid a sharp rise of Esso and Royal Dutch Shell production in Chubut, the firm now covered a third of the nation's oil market. A partnership with distributor Auger & Co. signed in 1925 resulted in a network of over 700 filling stations selling 178 million liters (47 million gallons) by 1930 – an 18% market share. Company revenues in 1930 reached US$25 million.

The Petroleum Institute (Instituto del Petróleo) was created on 30 December 1929, and directed by Ricardo Rojas, the rector of the University of Buenos Aires. Foreseeing conflicts with US private companies, Mosconi proposed an agreement with the Soviet state company Amtorg, which was to allow Argentina to import 250,000 tons of petroleum each year, paid by trade with leather, wool, tannin and mutton. The agreement was to be made official in September 1930, along with the complete nationalization of oil resources; but on 6 September 1930, Yrigoyen was deposed by a military coup headed by General José Félix Uriburu, and the project was withdrawn.

=== Energy self-sufficiency ===
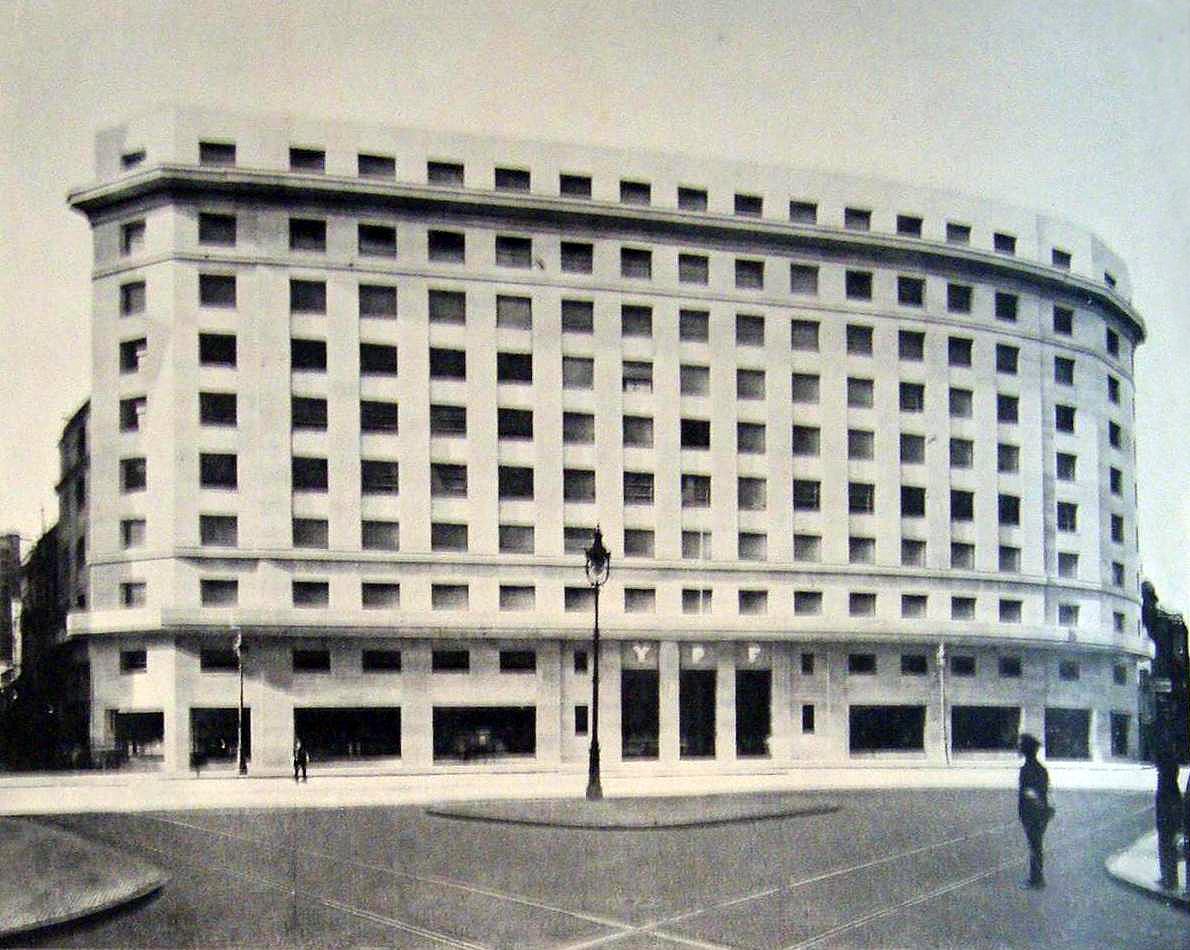
Former headquarters on Diagonal Norte Avenue (1938)

The coup was lobbied for chiefly by Standard Oil, whose interests in Salta Province and neighboring Bolivia conflicted with those of YPF. The subsequent Concordance regime supported YPF, however, and its role as the nation's leading oil distillates retailer was bolstered by a 1936 agreement with the Automóvil Club Argentino (ACA) to supply a chain of ACA service stations. Oil production by YPF continued to grow, and soon eclipsed private production: from just over 5 million barrels (37% of the total) in 1934, production grew to 15 million in 1945 (67%). The development of the nation's sizable natural gas resources also originated largely from YPF. Drawing from an initiative by YPF director Julio Canessa, President Juan Perón ordered that the gas flared off in YPF oil extraction should instead be captured, and sold by a state company, thus establishing the sister firm Gas del Estado ("State Gas") in 1946. The nation's first gas compressor and what at the time was the world's longest gas pipeline were completed by 1949, leading to a fifty-fold increase in natural gas production. Oil production at YPF surpassed 25 million barrels (84% of the nation's total) by 1955.

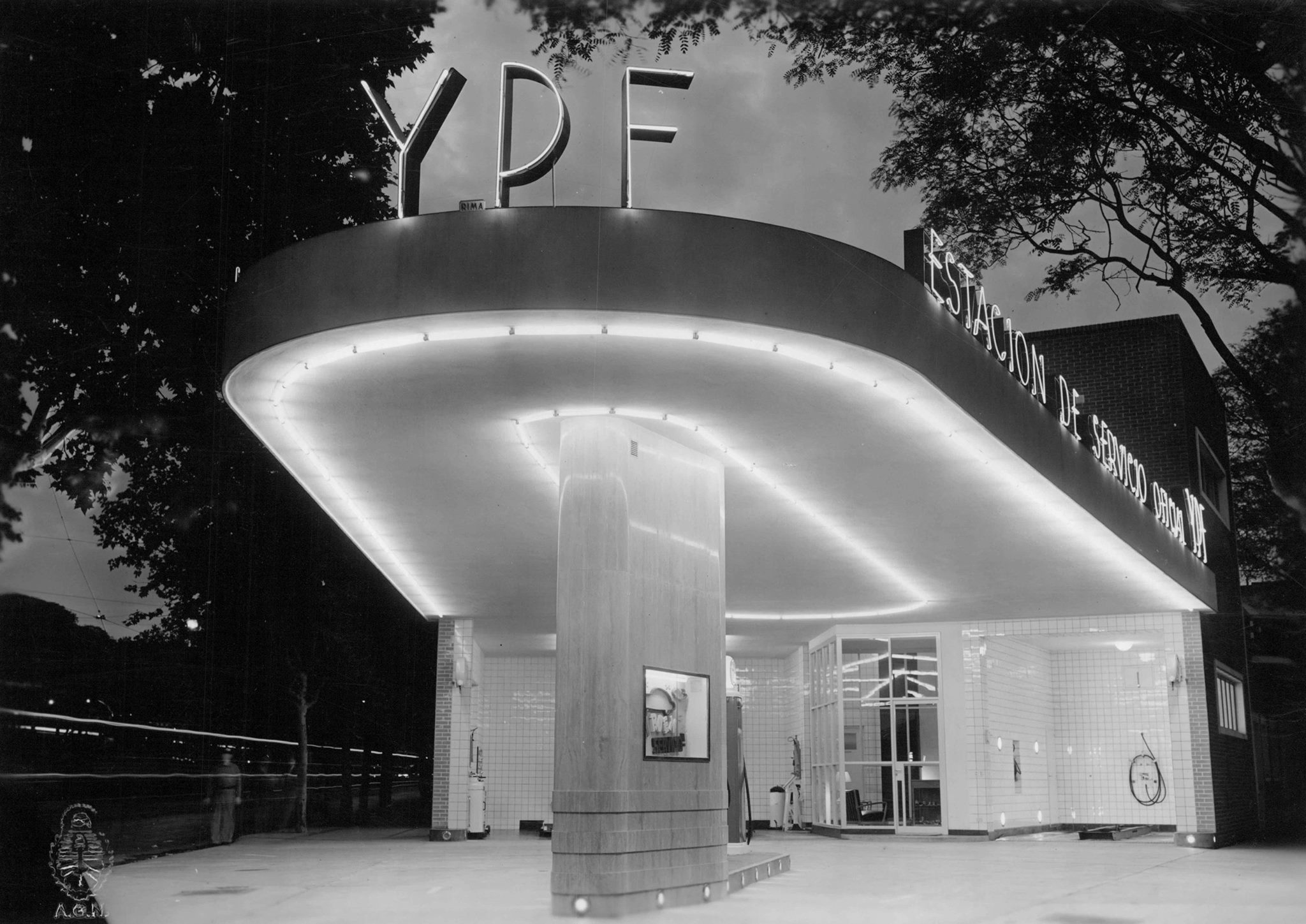
YPF gas station in Chacarita, Buenos Aires (1951)

This gain was partly offset by a 40% drop in private-sector output, however, such that overall oil production rose by only one-third during the Peronist decade while annual consumption nearly doubled to 70 million barrels. The nation's oil supply thus shifted from 60% domestic in 1945, to 60% imported by 1954. Oil imports by 1955 rose to US$300 million, or over one fourth of total merchandise imports. Perón had made economic nationalism a policy centerpiece. YPF was granted an exemption from steep oil import tariffs levied on private firms, and Article 40 of the Constitution of 1949 stipulated the nationalization of all energy and mineral resources. The deteriorating oil deficit led Perón to court foreign investment in the sector as early as 1947, however, when an oil drilling contract was signed by YPF with U.S. firm Drilexco. Total exploration doubled, and significant reserves in Salta Province were developed. A more controversial joint venture with Standard Oil of California was signed in 1955 for the eventual production of up to 56 million barrels a year. These initiatives were opposed by much of the Army, the opposition UCR, and among others Perón's point man on national oil policy, YPF head Julio Canessa, who was dismissed. The venture ended following Perón's overthrow in September.

Former YPF logo

An erstwhile critic of both the Drilexco and Standard Oil contracts, President Arturo Frondizi enacted policies in 1958 which granted foreign firms rental contracts by YPF over new wells to foster exploration and production. A key part of the developmentalist economic policy advanced by Frondizi, this policy was made with the caveat that oil and gas resources themselves would be renationalized. Thirteen contracts were signed with mainly U.S. firms, whereby each contractor would earn 40% of the revenues produced from the new wells. Private production, which had virtually ceased, grew to become one third of the nation's total. YPF itself benefited by way of a royalty bonanza, which financed record investments. These in turn led a doubling of YPF production to 65 million barrels; including the private sector, Argentina's oil production thus nearly tripled to 98 million barrels by 1962, and despite higher consumption, imports fell to merely one sixth of total demand.

These contracts created a controversy referred to by Frondizi himself as the "oil battle," and were ultimately cancelled by President Arturo Illia in 1963 over concerns that YPF would be deprived of adequate returns for its exploration investments; of the foreign firms which had taken part in the 1958 bids, only Amoco remained. The cancellations cost US$50 million in indemnity payments, though they proved fortuitous after the company's discovery of the Puesto Hernández field in 1965. Puesto Hernández, near Rincón de los Sauces, Neuquén Province, was later declared the "national energy capital" due to its having at the time around half of Argentina's reserves of oil and natural gas. This discovery allowed YPF output to rise by 50% between 1965 and 1968 to 95 million barrels, its share of the nation's oil output growing from two-thirds to three-fourths. New oil field rental contracts were signed following a 1967 policy change enacted by President Juan Carlos Onganía which had the goal of achieving self-sufficiency in oil by 1975. Regaining its monopoly on oil imports in 1971 (which still averaged around 15 million barrels), YPF retained a majority of production (75%), as well as refining and distribution (60%), of petroleum in Argentina. The firm operated 7 refineries and 3,000 service stations by 1977, while production reached 118 million barrels.

=== Decline and privatization ===
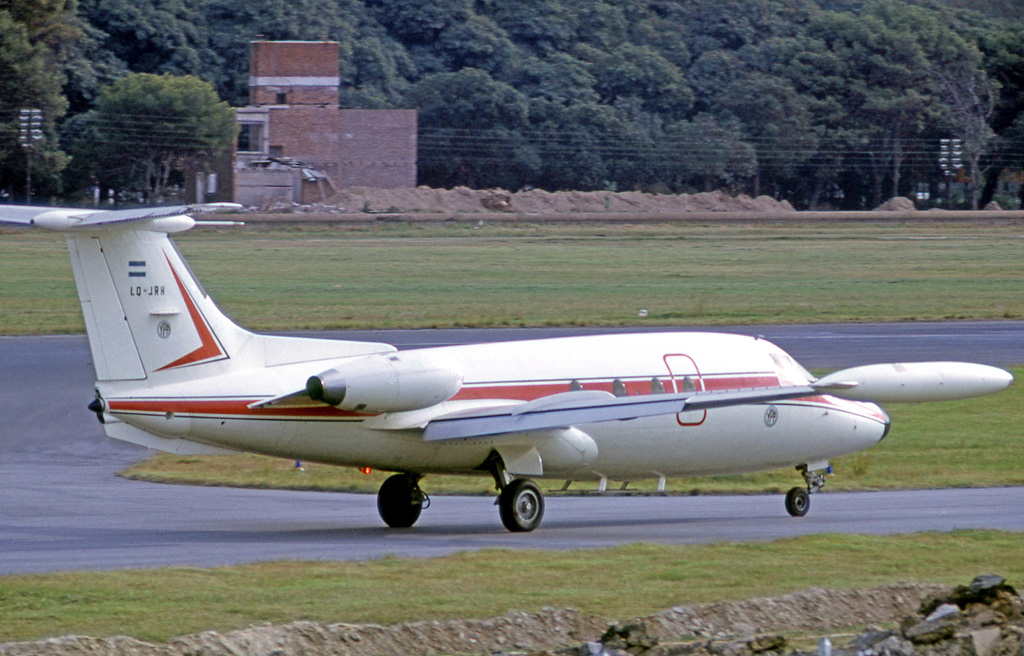
YPF business jet, Aeroparque Newbery, 1972

Perón's return to Argentina and to the presidency in 1973 was followed by the addition of nearly 20,000 employees (YPF employed 53,000 by 1976). It also coincided with the 1973 oil shock, however, and the US$470 million in added oil import costs combined with larger payrolls to erase profits in 1974, while production declined slightly. The dictatorship installed in a March 1976 coup initially presided over a revitalization and streamlining of YPF. Output increased by 20% and its finances initially improved following a wave of layoffs that returned employment levels to around 35,000 by 1979.

The military government was openly hostile to YPF's paramount position in the oil industry, however. The company lost money every year after 1975 and by 1981 was US$4.1 billion in debt. YPF losses resulted, at least in large part, from policy decisions beyond its control. Government policy after 1976 kept oil prices well below inflation, with the consequence that costs increased faster than income. YPF also bore an extremely heavy tax burden, as 68.4% of its revenues were paid as tax to the national and provincial governments, as well as a long list of state agencies that included the National Energy Fund, the National Highway Council, and the Provincial Road Fund. Another serious drain resulted from the failure of other state enterprises such as Argentine Railways and the national airline to pay YPF for their fuel in full and on time. These intergovernmental accounts represented 20% of YPF's sales and were as much as ten years in arrears. The tax policy of the military government followed the same path as its civilian predecessors, a path that regarded YPF as a convenient source of funds to ease the country's chronic and serious fiscal deficit position.

The death in a plane crash of the firm's director, Raúl Ondarts, and the appointment of General Guillermo Suárez Mason in 1981 was followed by a period of severe mismanagement, moreover. Powerful as head of the First Army Corps (which committed many of the "Dirty War" atrocities), Suárez Mason installed many of his hard-line Army Intelligence colleagues in managerial posts at YPF. They in turn diverted large quantities of fuel into the director's newly established company Sol Petróleo, a dummy corporation used by Suárez Mason and his appointees for embezzlement as well as to divert funds to the Contras and the fascist organization P2 (to which the director belonged).

Suárez Mason had YPF borrow heavily not only to cover such asset stripping but also at the behest of Economy Minister José Alfredo Martínez de Hoz, whose bid for currency strength and policy of financial deregulation required a sharp rise in foreign debt to maintain. YPF debts thus rose 142-fold during Suárez Mason's tenure, at the end of which in 1983 the company recorded a US$6 billion loss (the largest in the world at the time).

YPF nonetheless remained the 365th largest firm in the world, with sales of over US$4 billion in 1992. Argentine President Carlos Menem initiated the privatization of YPF through an IPO on the New York and other stock exchanges on 28 June 1993, at a value of US$3 billion for stock equal to a 45% share in the company. During the 18 months prior to the IPO, YPF underwent a massive restructuring process led by its new CEO José Estenssoro, who had been appointed by President Menem. The staff of YPF was reduced from 52,000 to 10,600 through layoffs agreed with unions and outsourcing of services to companies established by former YPF employees during the restructuring process. The financial bottom line for the company was increased from a loss about $1 billion in 1991 (although the accounting system at the time could not accurately compute actual profit) to a profit of $1 billion in 1993, and the underlying value of YPF was increased from about US$2 billion to the US$9 billion after privatization.

Estenssoro stayed on as CEO, and further streamlined the company while expanding its reach outside Argentina, acquiring Maxus Energy Corporation of Dallas for US$740 million in 1995. Estenssoro died in a plane crash in Ecuador, where Maxus maintained wells, in May of that year. His policy of high exploration investments was maintained by his successor, Nells León, and reserves expanded by 50% while production rose from 109 million barrels in 1993 to a record 190 million in 1998; of the latter total, 32 million were produced by Maxus operations in Ecuador and elsewhere.

=== Repsol acquisition ===
Madrid-based multinational corporation Repsol purchased 98% of YPF in 1999 in two stages: a 15% share sold by the national government for US$2 billion, and a further 83% for over US$13 billion including all remaining public sector shares (10%, equally divided between the nation and the provinces) as well as most of the outstanding investor shares. The union of the two companies took on the name Repsol YPF; YPF would represent 40% of the new firm's reserves and over 50% of its production.

The Petersen Group (property of the Eskenazi family of Buenos Aires) entered into a partnership with Repsol in 2007 by acquiring a 15% stake in YPF; the group bought another 10% of the company for US$1.3 billion on 4 May 2011. A majority of the firm's shares (58%) remained under the control of Repsol, while 16% remained in private portfolios; the Argentine Government retained the golden share. In 2014, Repsol exited the Argentine market, giving up its stake in YPF.

=== Renationalization ===
Argentine international energy trade recorded an imbalance of US$3 billion in 2011, the first negative figure since 1987, and the relationship between YPF and the government became difficult. Investment in exploration at YPF as a percentage of profits had been far below those in most other Repsol subsidiaries. Market analysts and Repsol blamed the decline in exploration and production on government controls on exports and prospecting lease awards, and price controls on domestic oil and gas. Political risks and government intervention, including price controls, have discouraged foreign investment in oil production in Latin America in general. President Cristina Fernández de Kirchner raised YPF frequently in speeches during March 2012, claiming that underinvestment and excessive dividends at the firm had caused declines in output. Governors in six fossil-fuel producing provinces subsequently revoked YPF leases representing a fifth of its oil production.

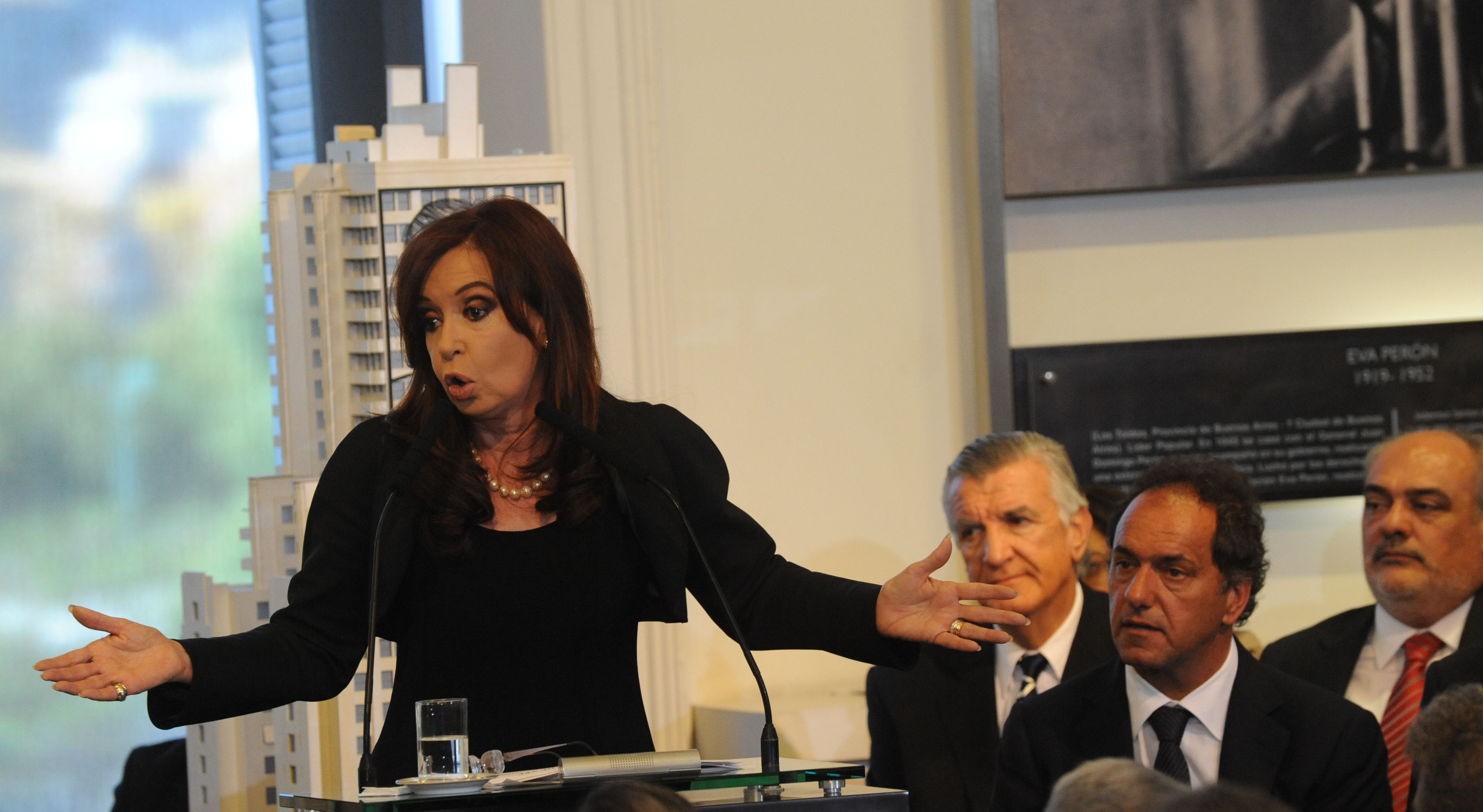
Cristina Fernández de Kirchner announces the bill to re-nationalize YPF, April 2012.

Citing Brazilian oil giant Petrobras as an example, the president announced the introduction of a bill on 16 April 2012, for the renationalization of YPF: the national government would purchase a controlling 51% share, with ten provincial governments receiving the remaining 49%. Planning Minister Julio de Vido was appointed to head the Federal intervention, replacing CEO Sebastián Eskenazi. Repsol YPF CEO Antonio Brufau, Spanish Prime Minister Mariano Rajoy, and other Spanish officials objected to the nationalisation, accusing the Argentine government of driving down YPF shares ahead of the announcement (market price of the shares declined by over half from February to April). Economy Minister Hernán Lorenzino claimed in turn that asset stripping at YPF had financed Repsol's expansion in other parts of the world.

Responses included a diplomatic offensive by Rajoy in other countries in the region, assurances by Industry Minister José Manuel Soria of "clear and decisive" Spanish government measures, Foreign Minister José García-Margallo y Marfil's admonition that Argentina had "shot itself in the foot" by damaging relations with Spain, and other threats.

The Chinese state oil concern, Sinopec, was reported to have been in talks to buy out Repsol's share in YPF – a potential deal scuttled by the Argentine announcement. Both Repsol and YPF shares fell sharply before and after the announcement, and the cost of insuring Argentine government bonds against default rose, as did those of Spain. Repsol Chairman Brufau estimated the company's potential loss at €5.7 billion (US$7.5 billion).

The largest minority shareholder, the Petersen Group, had financed their initial purchase of 15% of the stock with a vendor's loan from Repsol for €1.5 billion. The 2008 agreement required Repsol to buy back shares owned by the Group and to assume the loan should the Madrid-based firm lose majority control of YPF. Sebastián Eskenazi indicated however that the group would forgo this option.

The Senate of Argentina approved the takeover on 26 April with 63 votes in favor of the measure, three opposing it and four abstentions. The Chamber of Deputies in turn approved the bill on 4 May with 208 votes out of 257 and six abstentions. The president signed the renationalization into law on 5 May. Miguel Galluccio, an Argentine petroleum engineer with experience at both YPF and at oilfield services leader Schlumberger as president of its production management division in London, was appointed CEO.

Argentine Deputy Economy Minister Axel Kicillof rejected Repsol's initial demands for payment of US$10.5 billion for a 57% stake in YPF (the state sought 51%), citing debts of nearly US$9 billion. The book value of YPF was US$4.4 billion at the end of 2011; its total market capitalization on the day of the announcement was US$10.4 billion. Repsol officials submitted the matter to the World Bank ICISD for arbitration. The Argentine government and Repsol reached agreement in principle on compensation in November 2013, and on 25 February 2014, Repsol announced final agreement that the Argentine government would provide Repsol with guaranteed Argentine government bonds of varying maturities, the nominal amount varying to assure that Repsol would in fact receive US$5 billion in compensation for the 51% of YPF nationalized.

YPF also acquired a controlling stake in Metrogas (the nation's largest gas distributor) in November 2012. A joint exploratory venture for the development of tight oil and shale gas at the Vaca Muerta field was signed with Chevron Corporation on 16 July 2013. Following its renationalization, rapidly rising investment levels at YPF have been funded mostly via internal financing, by Chevron, and by the periodic issuance of high-yield corporate bonds. These bond issuances were raised to US$1.5 billion per series in April 2015, as demand surged to US$4 billion.

In December 2019, the recently inaugurated President Alberto Fernández put Guillermo Nielsen in charge of YPF. Nielsen was replaced by Pablo Gerardo González in January 2021.

=== Reprivatization plans ===
President-elect Javier Milei stated after his election in 2023 that YPF was one of the state-controlled companies that he planned to privatize.

In August 2026, YPF agreed to sell its 70% stake in Metrogas, the gas distributor it had acquired in 2012, to Edenor for US$780 million, as part of a broader review of its asset portfolio. Businessman José Luis Manzano, who controlled Edenor and already held a minority stake in Metrogas, prevailed over rival biddersa Central Puerto, MSU, Grupo Pierri, and Litoral Gas. The sale remained subject to regulatory approval and a subsequent tender offer for the shares not held by Edenor.

== Operations ==
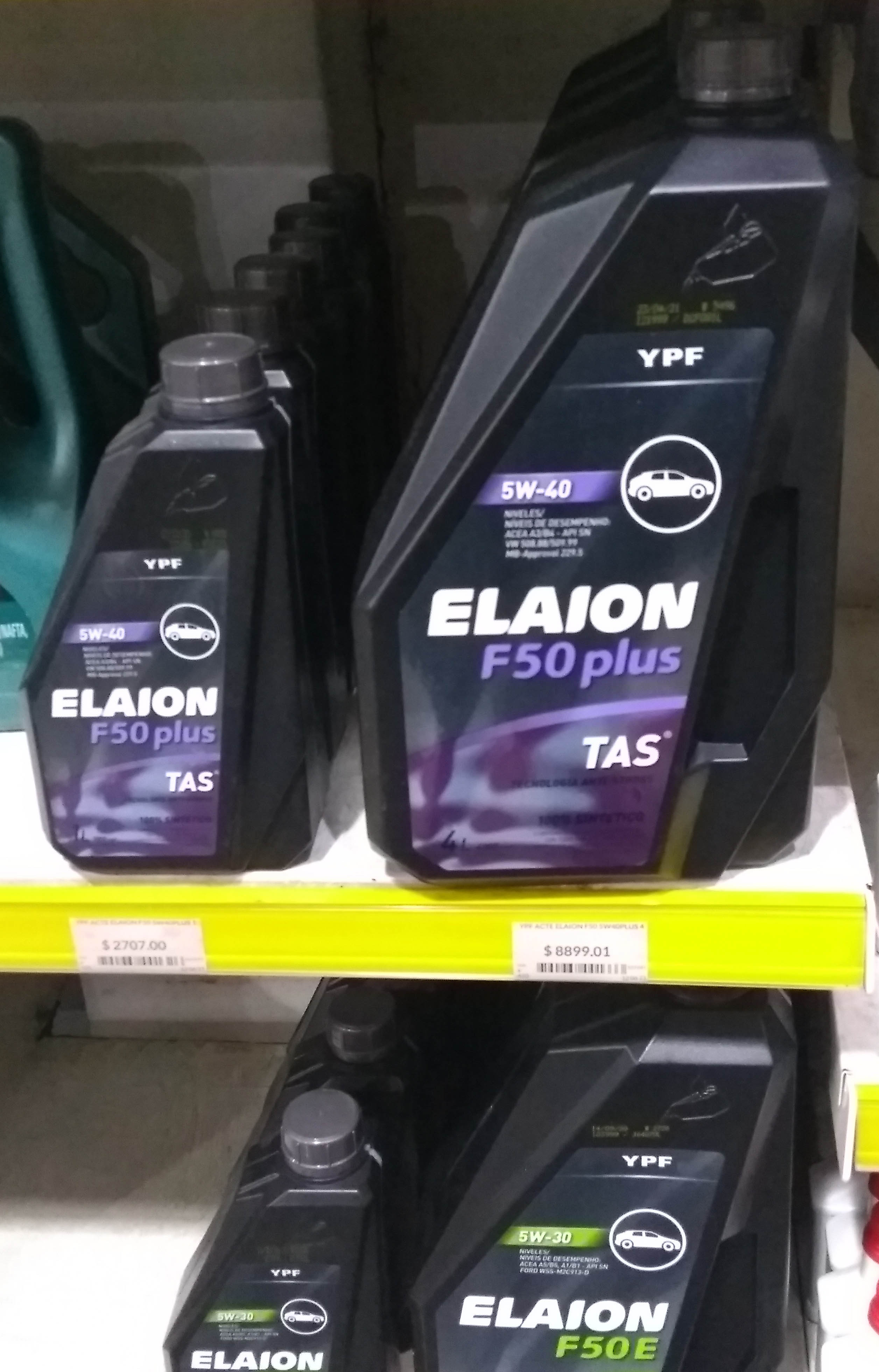
"Elaion" motor oil brand of YPF

The company remained the largest in its sector in Argentina despite declining production, operating 52% of the nation's refinery capacity in three facilities and 1,600 filling stations. Its sales of gasoline and other motor fuels totaled 12.15 billion liters (3.21 billion gallons) in 2011, accounting for 57% of the national market.

Oil production in Argentina peaked in 1998 at 308 million barrels and declined steadily afterward, reaching 209 million in 2011. Natural gas production also declined, from 52 billion m^{3} in 2004 to 45.5 billion. The company's production of oil had fallen by 43% between 1998 and 2011, and of natural gas by 37% from its high in 2004. Oil exploration fell from 30 wells in 1998 to 8 in 2010 (French energy firm Total S.A. overtook YPF as the leading oil driller in Argentina).

YPF shares of total output fell 8 points to 34% in oil, and 12 points to 23% in natural gas; its declines in output represented 54% of lost oil production and 97% in the case of natural gas. The company's oil production had declined by a further 7%, and gas by 9%, during 2011. Production declines of 6% annually under Repsol were reversed following the renationalization, however. Amid sharp increases in profitability and investment, output in 2013 rose by 3.4% in oil and a 2.2% in gas, and a further 8.7% and 12.5% in oil and gas, respectively, during 2014.

YPF announced the discovery in November 2011 of an 8071 km^{2} unconventional oil field, Vaca Muerta, with recoverable reserves of 22.8 billion barrels of oil equivalent, and potential to extend to an area of up to 30,000 km^{2} (11,600 mi^{2}). Its reserves of crude and natural gas, not including the new shale finds, fell 60% and 67% respectively between 1999 and 2011.

The firm's new headquarters, the Repsol-YPF Tower, was designed by César Pelli and inaugurated in 2008. After YPF's renationalization it was renamed to YPF Tower.

YPF is part of the eight companies that make up the Vaca Muerta Oil Sur (VMOS) that received a US$2 billion loan for the crude oil export pipeline and terminal to be constructed and connect Vaca Muerta with the Atlantic coast of Río Negro in July 2025. In July 2026, the 437 kilometer project was already more than 70% complete and it is expected to reach exports up to 550,000 barrels of oil per day in 2027.

On 28 October 2025, YPF acquired the remaining 50% stake in Refinería del Norte (Refinor) from Hidrocarburos del Norte for US$25.2 million, so that it now controls 100% of the stock, including more than 70 service stations.

YPF sold its 50% stake in Profertil in December 2025 for US$596 million.

YPF submitted a LLL Oil development project to Argentina's Large Investment Incentive Regime (RIGI) in May 2026. The proposed US$25 billion investment would be used over the course of 15 years for the drilling of 1,152 wells.

=== Company statistics ===
Year	Petroleum output (million barrels)	Natural gas output (billion cu ft)	Petroleum reserves (million barrels)	Natural gas reserves (billion cu ft)	New exploratory wells	Net revenue (million USD)	Profits after tax (million USD)
1992	101	493	1029	10918	17	4094	271
1993–95	130	423	1136	8965	82	4445	693
1996–98	182	490	1458	9812	34	5854	758
1999–2001	173	606	1592	10472	13	7806	842
2002–04	154	631	1255	7923	11	5974	1455
2005–07	127	651	677	4739	14	8544	1527
2008–10	111	544	601	3805	7	10531	1219
2011	100	441	583	3695	n.a.	13795	1289

Notes: unless specified. Three year periods are averages. Output data from 1995 to 2011 includes Maxus Energy and other overseas units, typically around 20% of YPF's worldwide total. Exchange rate from IMF.
* excludes Maxus Energy.

== See also ==
- Enarsa
- Bridas
- YCF
