= 2023 Buenos Aires provincial election =

| ← 2019 | 22 October 2023 | 2025 → |
- Turnout: 10,439,895 (75.51%) ▼4.49 pp
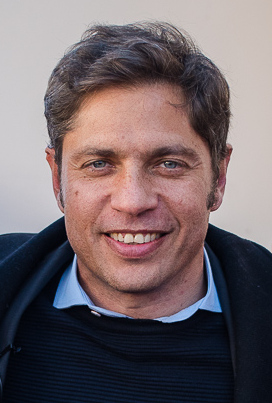

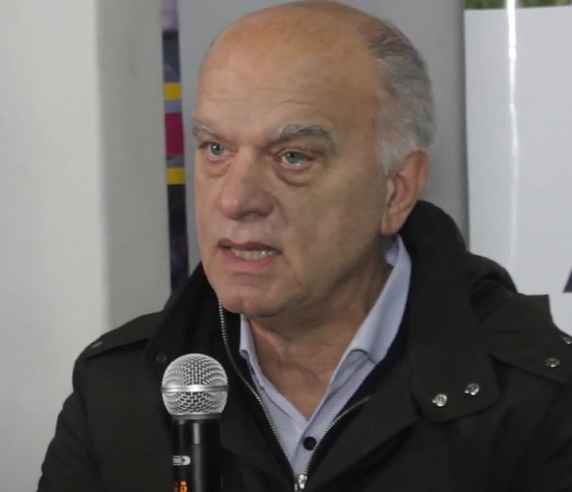

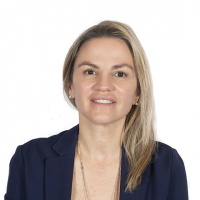

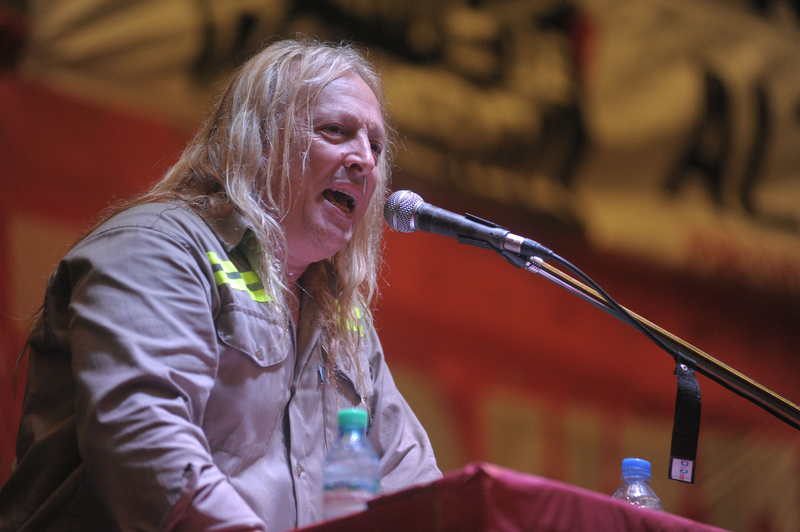
| Candidate | Axel Kicillof | Néstor Grindetti |
| Party | Justicialist Party | PRO |
| Alliance | Union for the Homeland | Juntos por el Cambio |
| Running mate | Verónica Magario | Miguel Fernández |
| Popular vote | 4,233,092 | 2,511,108 |
| Percentage | 44.88% | 26.62% |
| Candidate | Carolina Píparo | Rubén Sobrero |
| Party | Independent | Socialist Left |
| Alliance | La Libertad Avanza | Workers' Left Front |
| Running mate | Francisco Oneto | Nathalia González Seligra |
| Popular vote | 2,319,085 | 366,657 |
| Percentage | 24.59% | 3.88% |
- Map showing the seats won by each party in each partido Kicillof (88) Grindetti (43) Píparo (3)
Governor before election
Axel Kicillof
Justicialist Party–UP
Elected Governor
Axel Kicillof
Justicialist Party–UP

General elections were held in Buenos Aires Province on 22 October 2023, alongside national elections. The governor and vice governor, as well as half of the Chamber of Deputies and a half of the Senate were renewed. In addition, the municipal offices in the 135 partidos were renewed as well.

The candidacies of each major coalition were defined in the open, simultaneous, and mandatory primaries (PASO), which took place on 13 August 2023. Lists that won at least 1.5% of the votes (including blanks) qualified to the general election.

Incumbent governor Axel Kicillof, of Union for the Homeland (UP), was re-elected to a second term with 44.88% of the vote. Analysts pointed to Kicillof's successful re-election bid as a major factor in bolstering the shock victory of UP presidential hopeful Sergio Massa in the first round of the country's presidential elections.

== Results ==
=== Governor and Vice Governor ===
| Candidate | Running mate | Party | Votes | % |
|---|---|---|---|---|
| Axel Kicillof | Verónica Magario | Union for the Homeland | 4,330,482 | 44.94 |
| Néstor Grindetti | Miguel Fernández | Juntos por el Cambio | 2,563,582 | 26.61 |
| Carolina Píparo | Francisco Oneto | La Libertad Avanza | 2,367,294 | 24.57 |
| Rubén Sobrero | Nathalia González Seligra | Workers' Left Front – Unity | 373,819 | 3.88 |
| Total | | | 9,635,177 | 100.00 |
| Valid votes | | | 9,635,177 | 90.24 |
| Invalid votes | | | 61,207 | 0.57 |
| Blank votes | | | 980,563 | 9.18 |
| Total votes | | | 10,676,947 | 100.00 |
| Registered voters/turnout | | | 14,059,933 | 75.94 |

=== Chamber of Deputies ===
| Party | Votes | % | Seats | |
| Party | Votes | % | Won | Total |
|---|---|---|---|---|
| Union for the Homeland | 2,010,461 | 41.91 | 17 | 36 |
| Juntos por el Cambio | 1,390,250 | 28.98 | 16 | 38 |
| La Libertad Avanza | 1,215,467 | 25.34 | 13 | 16 |
| Workers' Left Front – Unity | 181,320 | 3.78 | 0 | 2 |
| Total | 4,797,498 | 100.00 | 46 | 92 |
| Valid votes | 4,797,498 | 89.09 | | |
| Invalid votes | 32,714 | 0.61 | | |
| Blank votes | 554,658 | 10.30 | | |
| Total votes | 5,384,870 | 100.00 | | |
| Registered voters/turnout | 7,122,920 | 75.60 | | |

=== Senate ===
| Party | Votes | % | Seats | |
| Party | Votes | % | Won | Total |
|---|---|---|---|---|
| Union for the Homeland | 2,227,289 | 47.00 | 11 | 21 |
| Juntos por el Cambio | 1,178,759 | 24.87 | 7 | 20 |
| La Libertad Avanza | 1,132,641 | 23.90 | 5 | 5 |
| Workers' Left Front – Unity | 200,547 | 4.23 | 0 | 0 |
| Total | 4,739,236 | 100.00 | 23 | 46 |
| Valid votes | 4,739,236 | 89.66 | | |
| Invalid votes | 28,915 | 0.55 | | |
| Blank votes | 517,459 | 9.79 | | |
| Total votes | 5,285,610 | 100.00 | | |
| Registered voters/turnout | 6,937,013 | 76.19 | | |

== See also ==
- 2023 Argentine provincial elections
- 2023 Buenos Aires City elections
