= 2014 G20 Brisbane summit =

Meeting of heads of state regarding economic issues

2014 G20 Brisbane Summit 9th G20 summit
- 15–16 November 2014
- Logo of the G20 Australia 2014 summit
- Host country: Australia
- Motto: Acting Together to Lift Growth and Create Jobs, Building a Stronger, More Resilient Global Economy and Strengthening Global Institution
- Cities: Brisbane; Canberra; & Perth.::
- Venues: Brisbane Convention & Exhibition Centre
- Participants: G20 members Guest invitees: Mauritania, Myanmar, New Zealand, Senegal, Singapore, Spain
- Chair: Tony Abbott

The 2014 G20 Brisbane summit was the ninth meeting of the G20 heads of government/heads of state. It was held in Brisbane, the capital city of Queensland, Australia. The hosting venue was the Brisbane Convention & Exhibition Centre at South Brisbane. The event was the largest ever peacetime police operation in Australia.

On 1 December 2013 Brisbane became the official host city for the G20. The City of Brisbane had a public holiday on 14 November 2014. Up to 4,000 delegates were expected to attend with around 2,500 media representatives. The leaders of Mauritania, Myanmar, New Zealand, Senegal, Singapore, and Spain were also invited to this summit.

== Agenda ==
European leaders expressed their desire to support the recovery since the 2008 financial crisis. European Commission President Barroso and European Council President Van Rompuy stressed the importance of coordinated growth strategies as well as finalising agreements on core financial reforms, and actions on tax and anti-corruption.

According to Waheguru Pal Singh Sidhu the main objectives of the summit were to "provide strategic priority for growth, financial rebalancing and emerging economies, investment and infrastructure, and employment and labour mobility". Professor of international finance law at the University of New South Wales Ross Buckley suggested that the summit should have emphasised the implementation of existing strategies rather than seeking agreement towards reforms.

Climate change was not included as a subject for discussion at the summit; Australian prime minister Tony Abbott stated he did not want the agenda "cluttered" by subjects that would distract from economic growth. Officials from the European Union and United States of America were reported to be unhappy with this decision. At each of the previous summits climate change was included on the agenda.

The Australian media stated that Australia will have had a significant effect on the agenda. Mike Callaghan, the director of the G20 Studies Centre at the Lowy Institute for International Policy has stated that if the G20 meeting was to attain significant outcomes it should focus on boosting infrastructure spending, multilateral trading systems and combating base erosion and profit shifting (BEPS). The discussion on tax avoidance had been fuelled by a disclosure of confidential tax agreements between more than 340 multinational corporations and Luxembourg (see also Luxembourg Leaks).

== Preparations ==
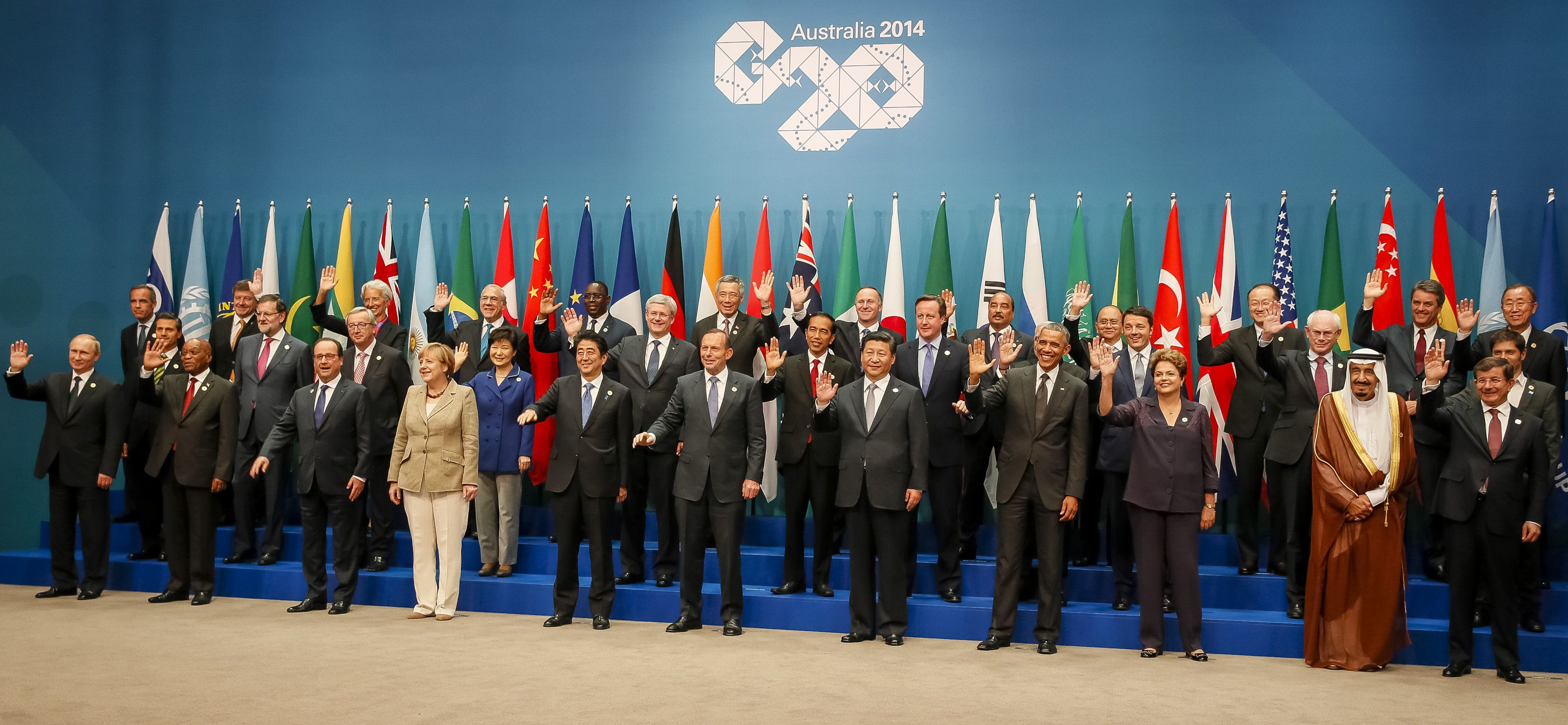
The G20 leaders wave on the final day of the forum

At the 2011 G20 Cannes summit, then-Prime Minister Julia Gillard was asked to have Australia host the 2014 summit. Brisbane was selected over the much larger Sydney because Brisbane Airport was better equipped to cater to significant increases in plane arrivals. Additionally, the Sydney Convention & Exhibition Centre would be undertaking renovations at the time. The Parliament of Queensland passed the G20 (Safety and Security) Act 2013 on 29 October 2013.

The event involved a complex security operation. Event organisers needed to ensure that appropriate security measures were in place to protect visitors, while minimising disruptions to inner-city residents and businesses. About 6,000 police from Queensland, wider Australia and New Zealand ensured security at the event, and more than 600 volunteers provided assistance at the summit.

Roads between the central business district and the Brisbane Airport were temporarily closed. Around 1,500 security specialists including interstate and overseas personnel together with thousands of Queensland police made patrols. Public transport services were reduced in the central business district and surrounding suburbs. One wing in a major Brisbane hospital was reserved for the exclusive use of world leaders during the summit.

A secure, government wireless network was required for public safety communications during the summit. Telstra established the network in Brisbane, the Gold Coast and Cairns before the event and later continued rolling it out across South East Queensland.

The Australian Government rented 16 bombproof Mercedes Benz S-Guard limousines specially for the summit at a cost of AU$1.8 million. Some world leaders however, including Barack Obama and Vladimir Putin planned to bring their own vehicles.

800 people were involved in a security exercise, which tested responses to security issues, crowd management and transport for over 10 hours on 6 October 2014. Actors portraying delegates were used, which involved a mock world leader arriving from a Qantas Boeing 737-800 at Brisbane Airport into a 13-vehicle motorcade consisting of police motorbikes, police cars, sedans, vans, an SUV and a ute, which travelled from the airport to a Brisbane hotel.

The cost of hosting the event was estimated at around AU$400 million.

== Associated meetings ==
G20 finance ministers and central bank governors met several times in 2014. Sydney hosted a meeting on 21–23 February 2014 followed by a meeting in Cairns, Queensland in September 2014. At the September meeting participating countries agreed to automatically exchange tax information to reduce tax evasion. Canberra hosted a meeting for G20 finance and central bank deputies in 2014. The Youth 20 Summit was the official G20 youth event held in Sydney in July 2014. A meeting of G20 trade ministers took place in Sydney during July, and the annual G20 Labour and Employment Ministerial Meeting was held in Melbourne during September. Officials-levels meetings of public servants took place throughout the year to prepare for the ministerial meetings.

== Security measures ==
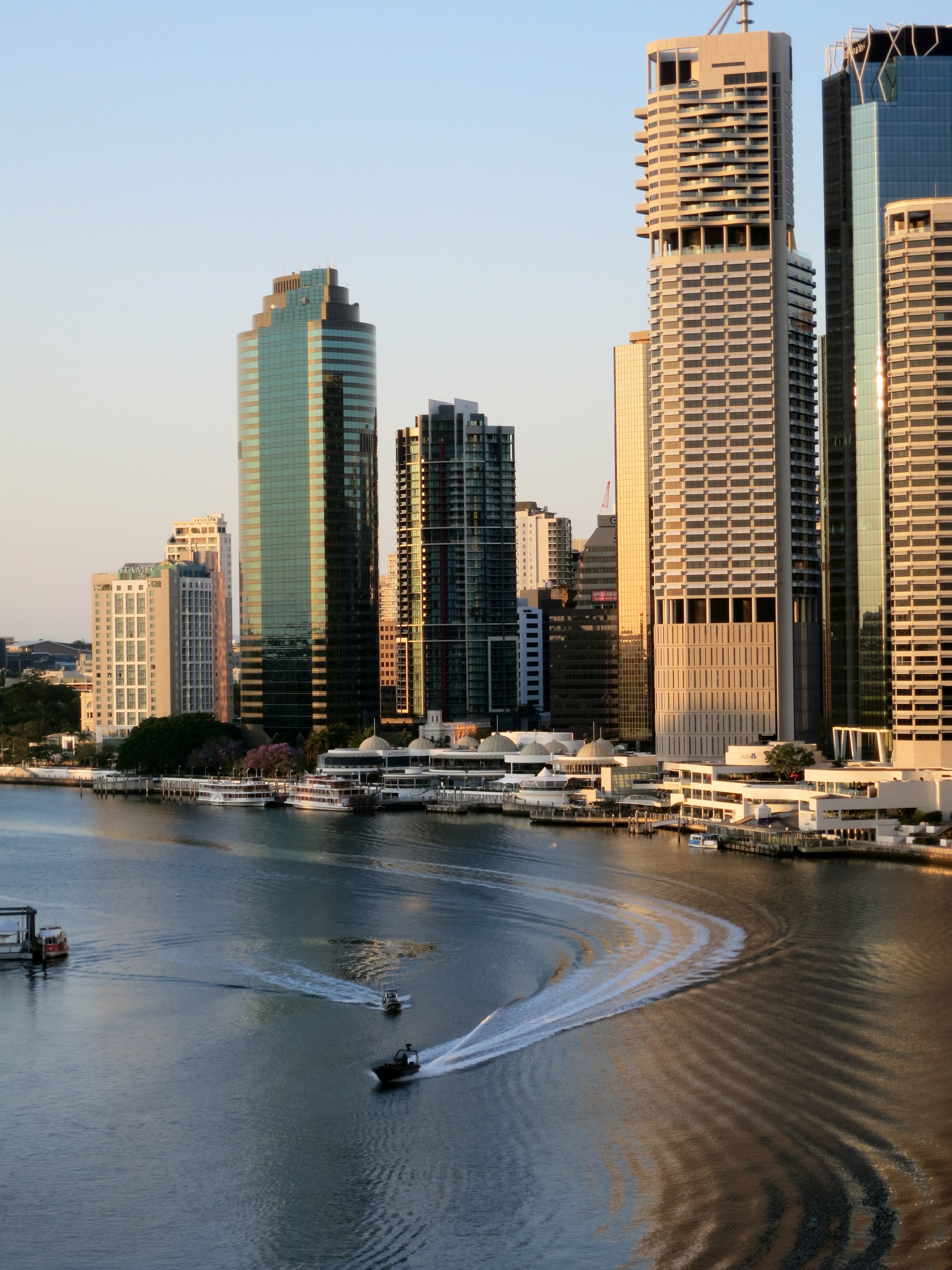
Police boats patrolling the Brisbane River on the day before the summit

A declared area took effect from 8 November with several restricted areas which were to be fenced and guarded by police. Freedom of movement for ordinary citizens was restricted. According to the G20 (Safety and Security) Regulation 2014 and article 12 of the G20 (Safety and Security) Act 2013, residents living in these areas had to have a security clearance performed, and their car given a security pass. Residents not receiving a security clearance were forced to leave the area, but were paid accommodation expenses.

The G20 legislation suspended important civil liberties, including the absolute right to arrest without warrant, in addition to the Police Powers Act 2000, to detain people without charge, to predispose the courts into not giving arrested individuals bail, extensive searches of the person without warrant. Officers had the backing of increased penalties when lawful directions are not followed. The Peaceful Assembly Act of 1992 was suspended during the G20 meeting dates. Size of placards were strictly regulated, as was permission to protest, and the location of protests. Legal observers were in force to observe the use of police power during this time. Heavy fines were enforceable due to the legislation. Most offences carried between 50 and 100 penalty units worth of fines. A penalty unit in 2014 was $110.

== Attendance ==
This meeting was the first time an Argentine President could not be in attendance; Cristina Fernández de Kirchner was ill, and so was represented by Economy Minister Axel Kicillof.

== Issues involving Russia ==
Opinion was divided both in Australia and elsewhere on whether Russian president Vladimir Putin should have been allowed to attend the G20 summit, following Russia's response to Malaysia Airlines Flight 17 being shot down as well as pro-Russian actions in Ukraine earlier in the year. Australia's foreign minister, Julie Bishop, approached other G20 countries about banning Putin from the meeting, and stated that this consultation found that there was not the necessary consensus to exclude him. A poll taken in July 2014 found 49% of Australians did not think Putin should be allowed to attend. It was confirmed in September that Putin would attend, with Abbott stating that "The G20 is an international gathering that operates by consensus – it's not Australia's right to say yes or no to individual members of the G20".

In November 2014, Russia sent a fleet of warships into international waters off the coast of Australia to accompany Putin's visit. The fleet consisted of Varyag, Marshal Shaposhnikov, a salvage and rescue tug, and a replenishment oiler. Australia responded by sending Stuart and Parramatta, as well as a P-3 Orion surveillance plane, to monitor the Russians. Although Russia had previously sent warships to accompany presidential attendance at international summits, the size of fleet and the lack of official notification to the host country made this an unprecedented move.

At the private leaders' retreat, held shortly before the official opening of the summit, Canadian Prime Minister Stephen Harper told Russian President Vladimir Putin "I guess I'll shake your hand but I have only one thing to say to you: You need to get out of Ukraine." The incident occurred as Putin approached Harper and a group of G20 leaders and extended his hand toward Harper. After the event was over, a spokesman for the Russian delegation said Putin's response was: "That's impossible because we are not there." According to Harper, he replied: "Well, that’s why it’s a waste of my time to talk to you."

== Participating leaders ==
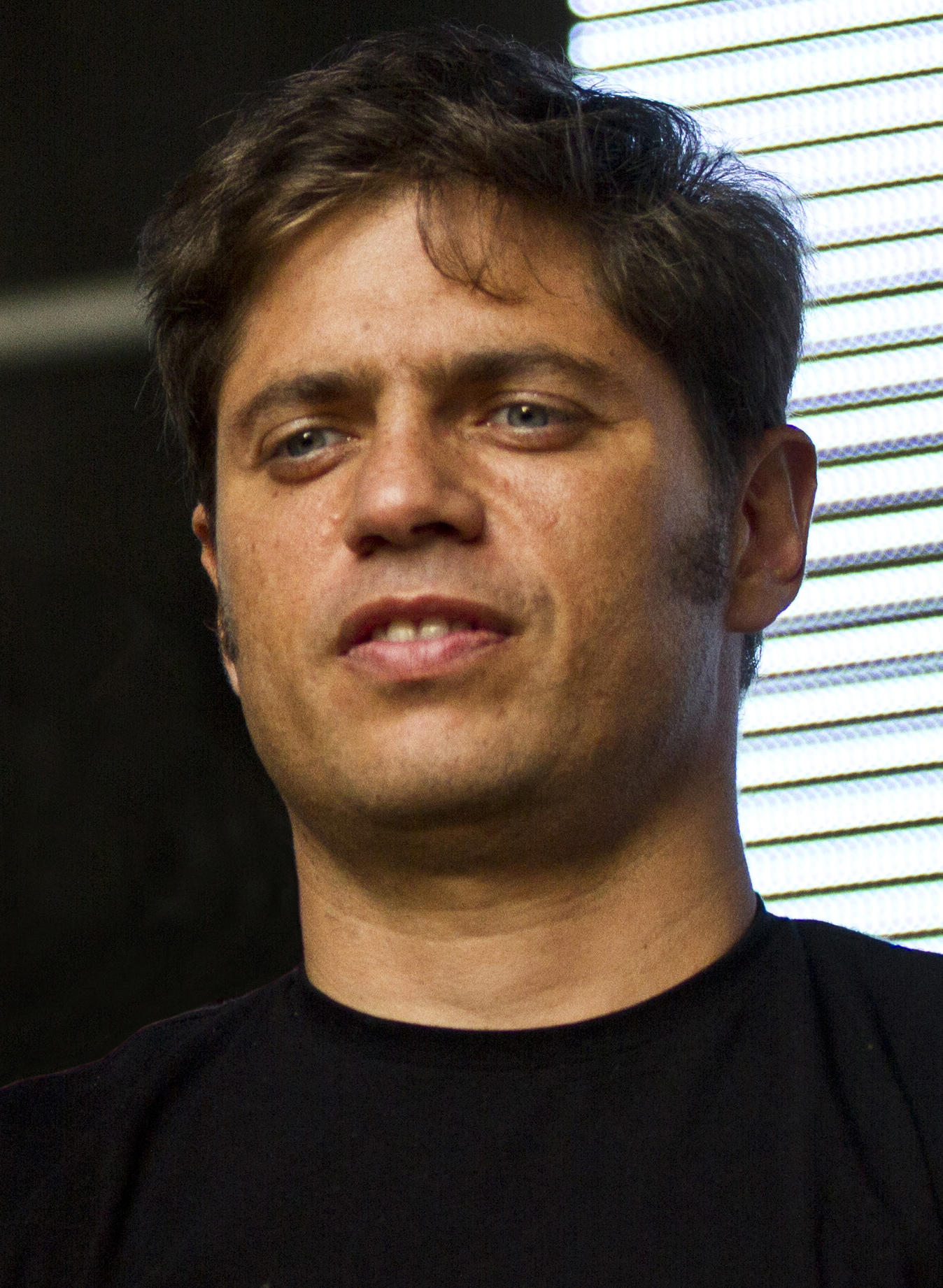
(Argentina) Argentina
Axel Kicillof, Minister of Economy

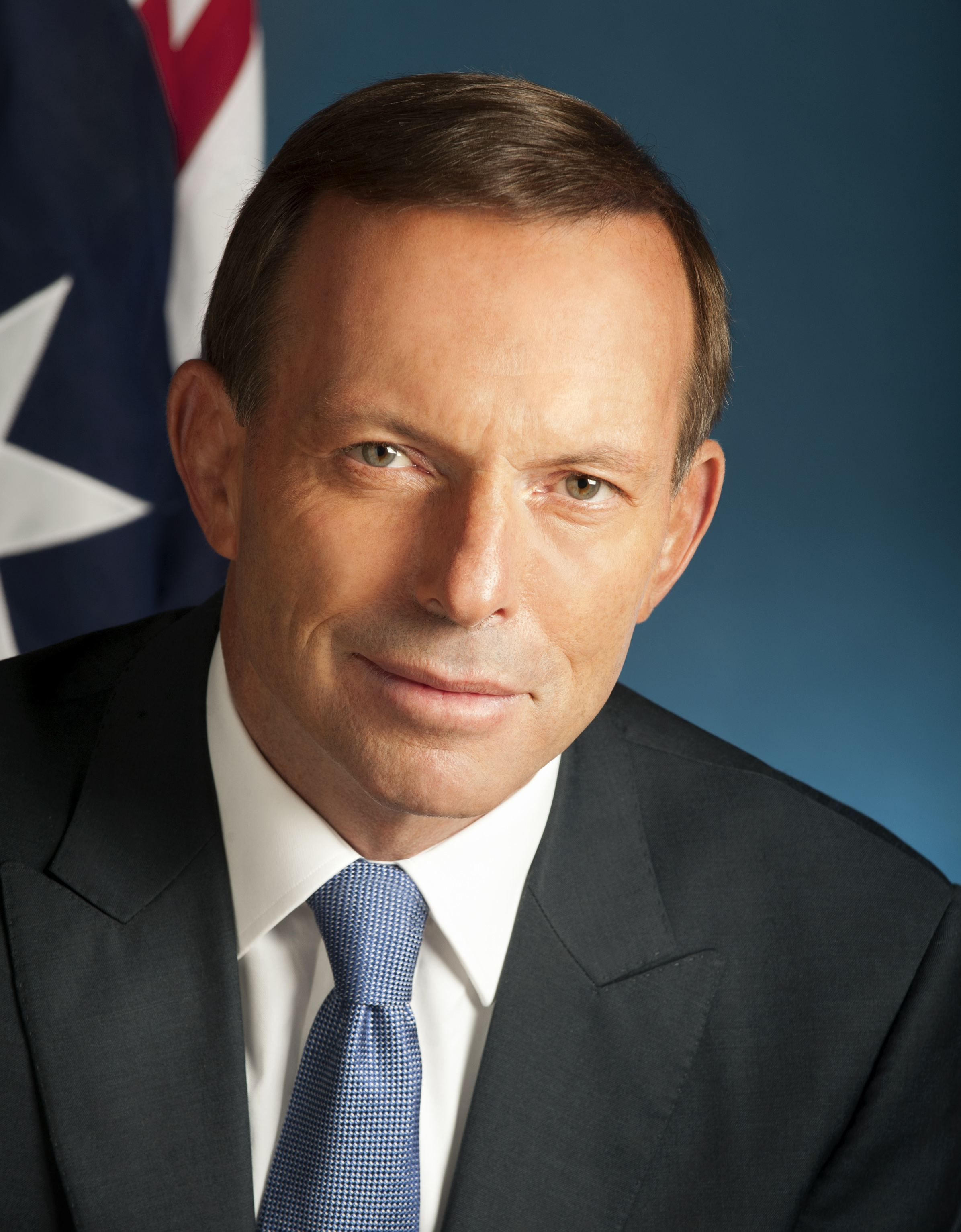
(Australia) Australia
Tony Abbott, Prime Minister (Host)

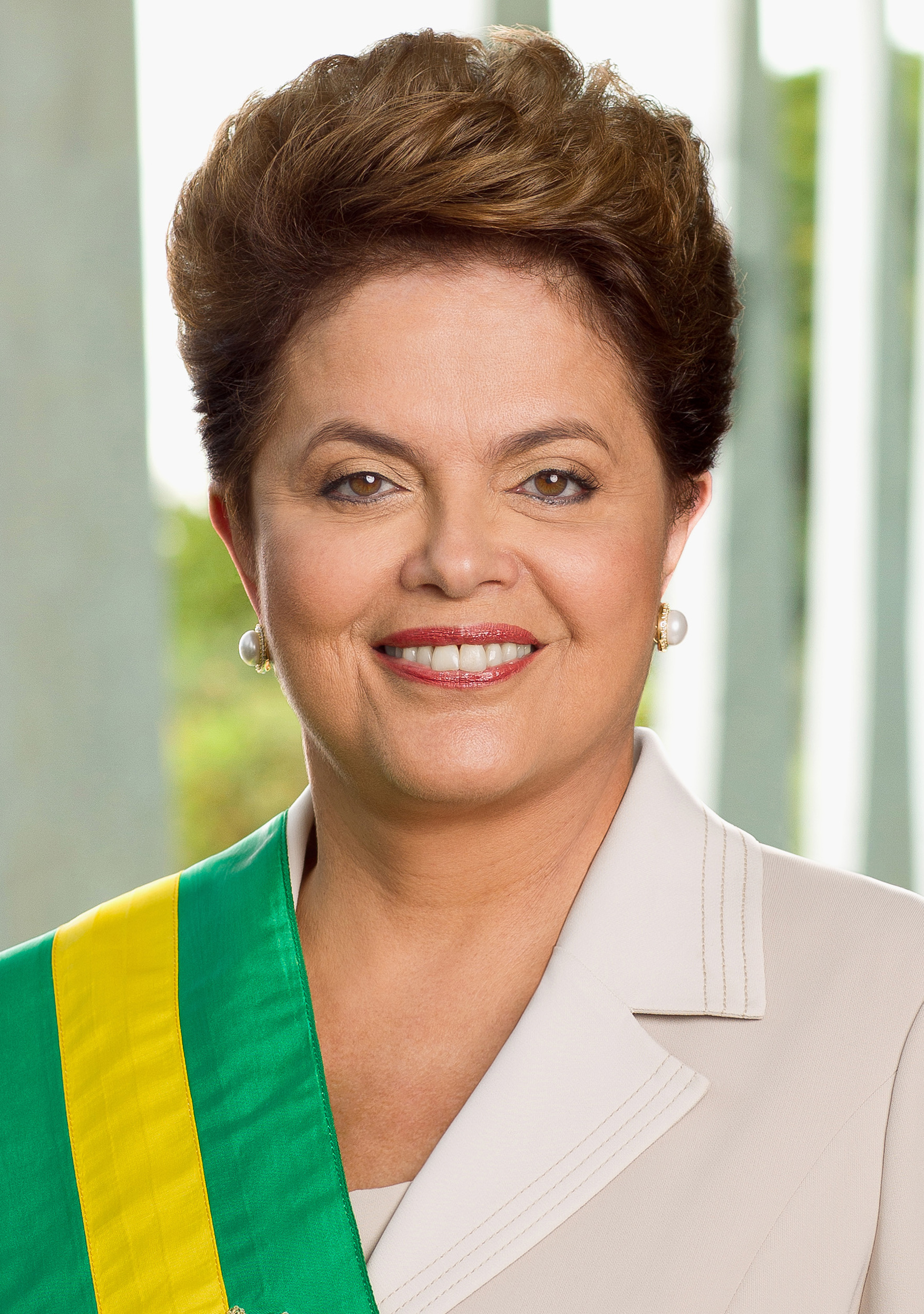
(Brazil) Brazil
Dilma Rousseff, President

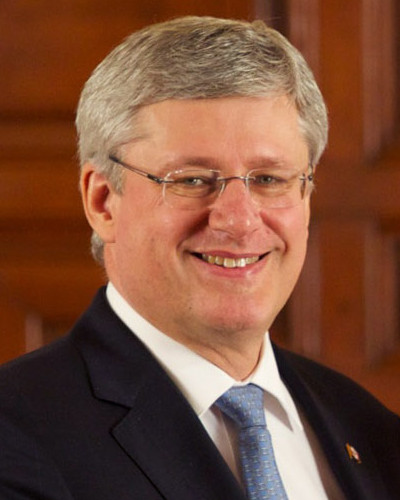
(Canada) Canada
Stephen Harper, Prime Minister

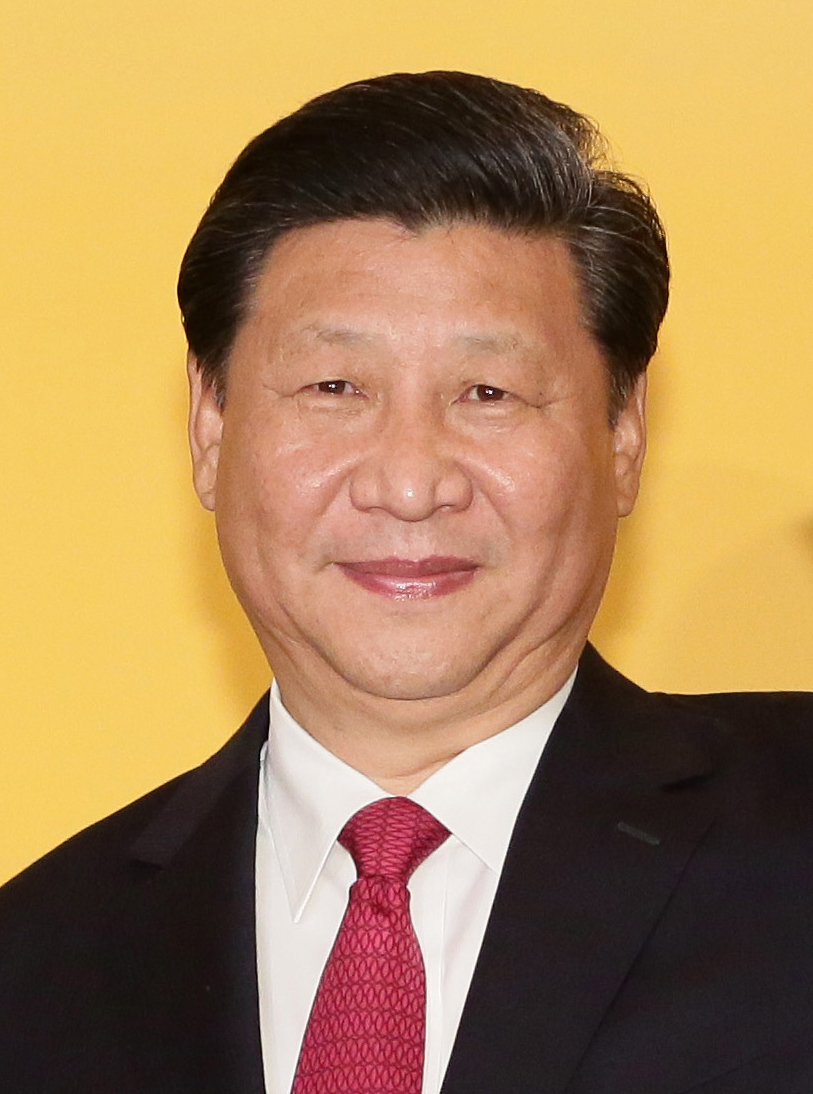
China
Xi Jinping, President

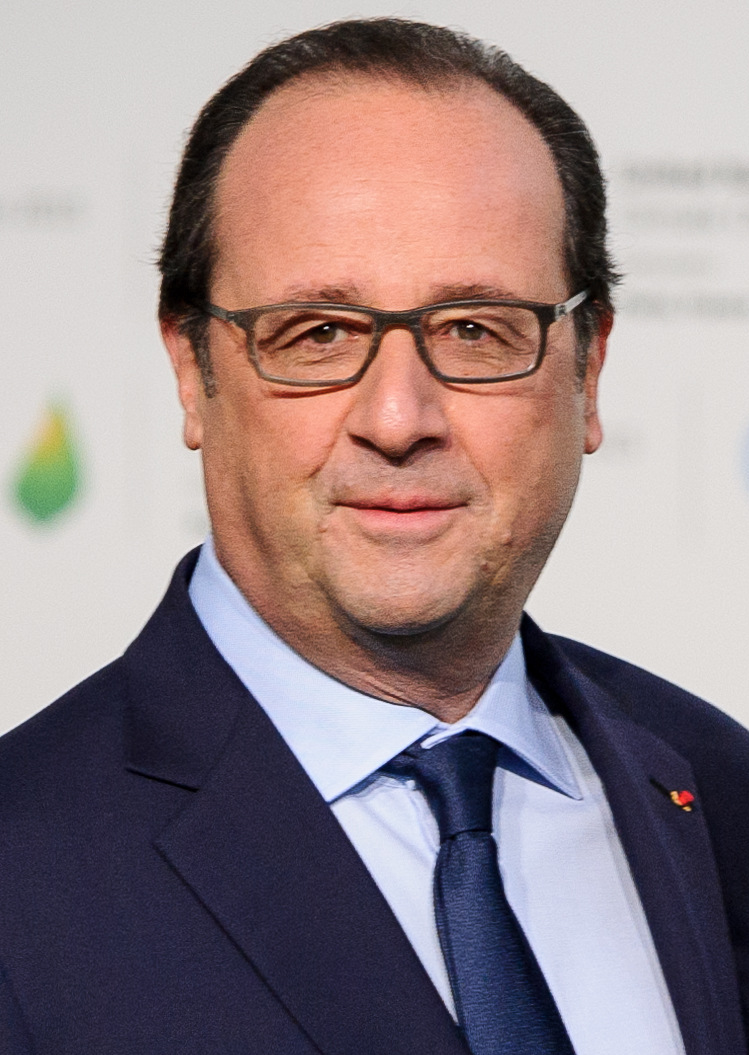
(France) France
François Hollande, President

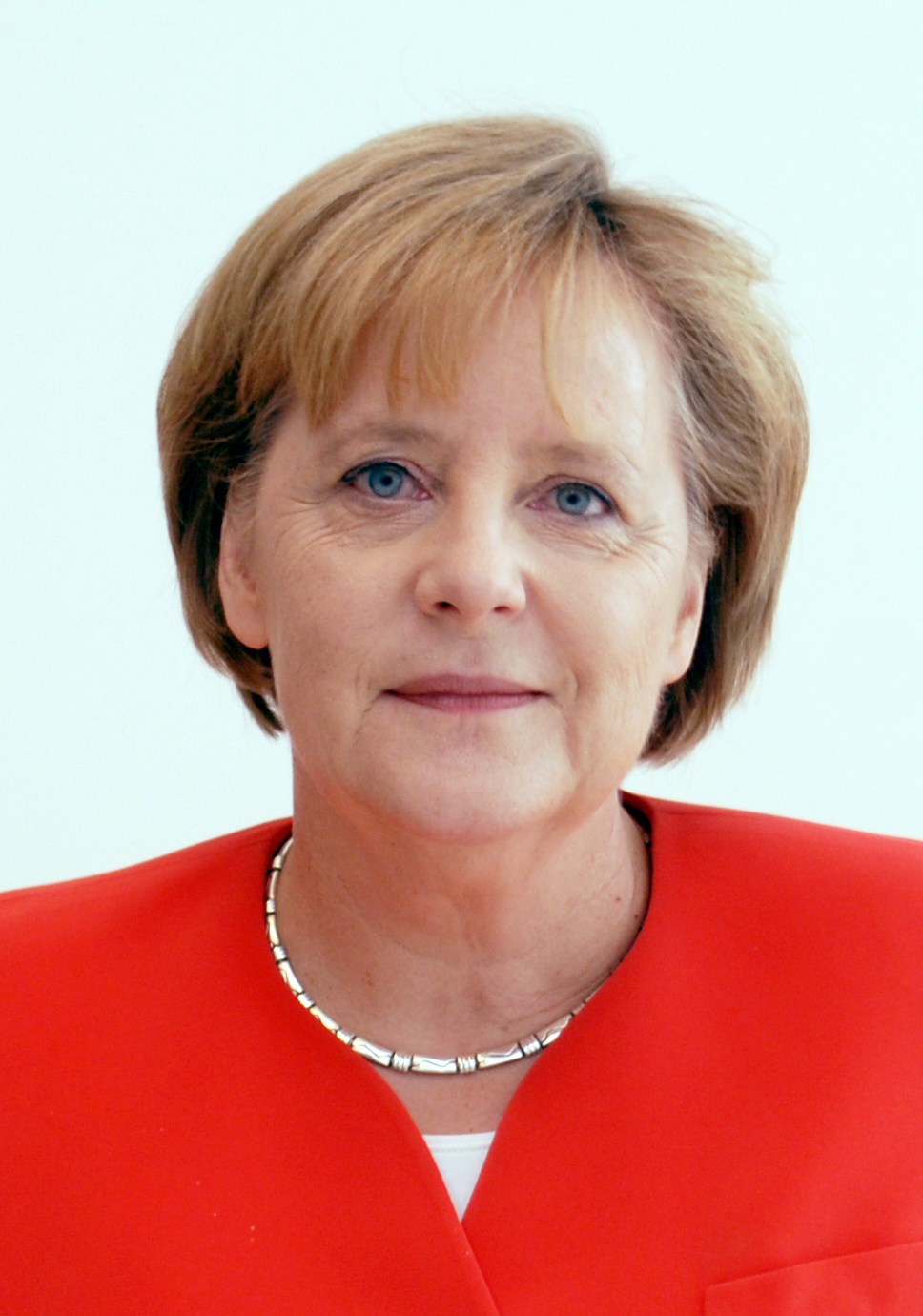
(Germany) Germany
Angela Merkel, Chancellor

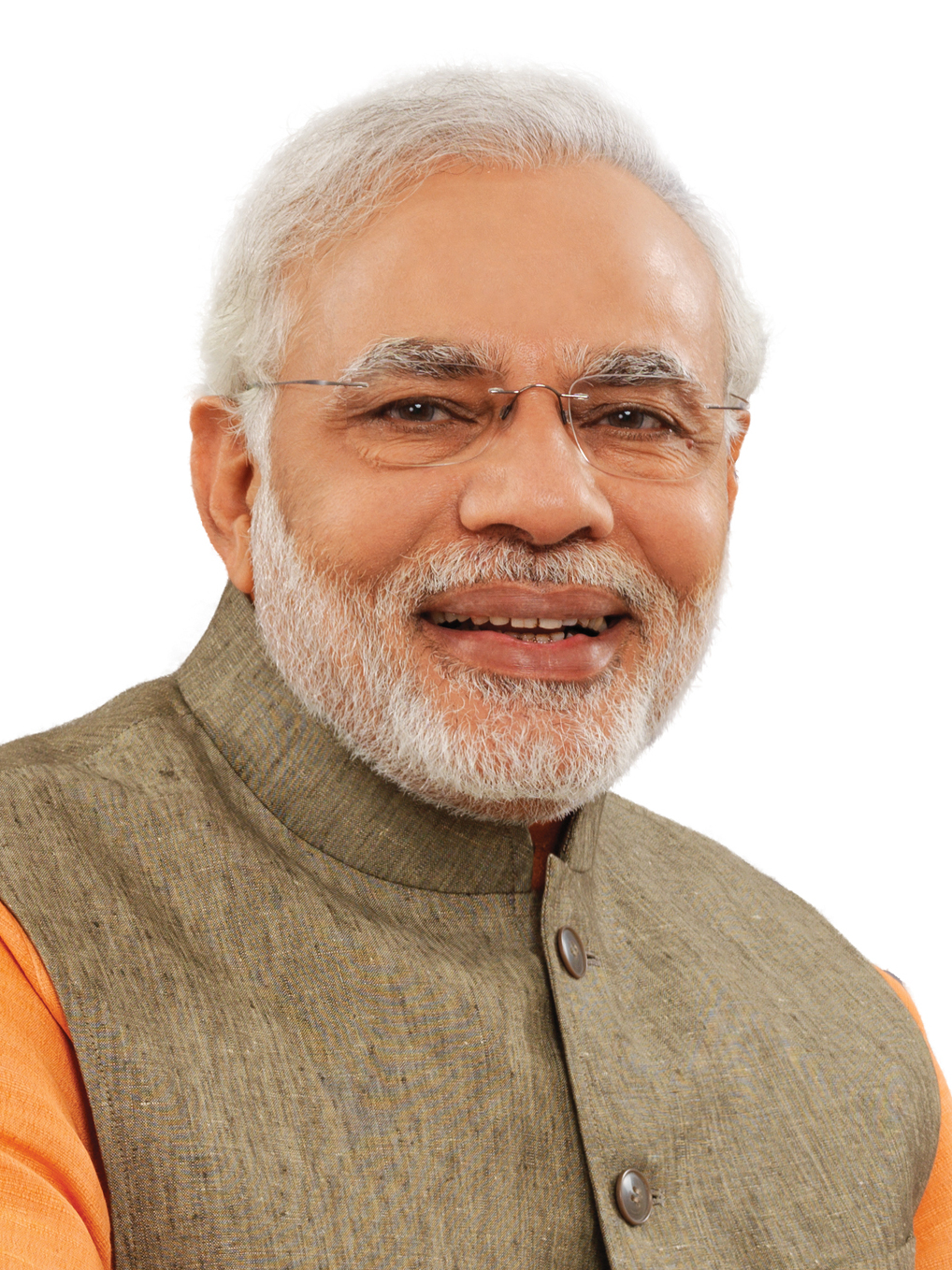
(India) India
Narendra Modi, Prime Minister

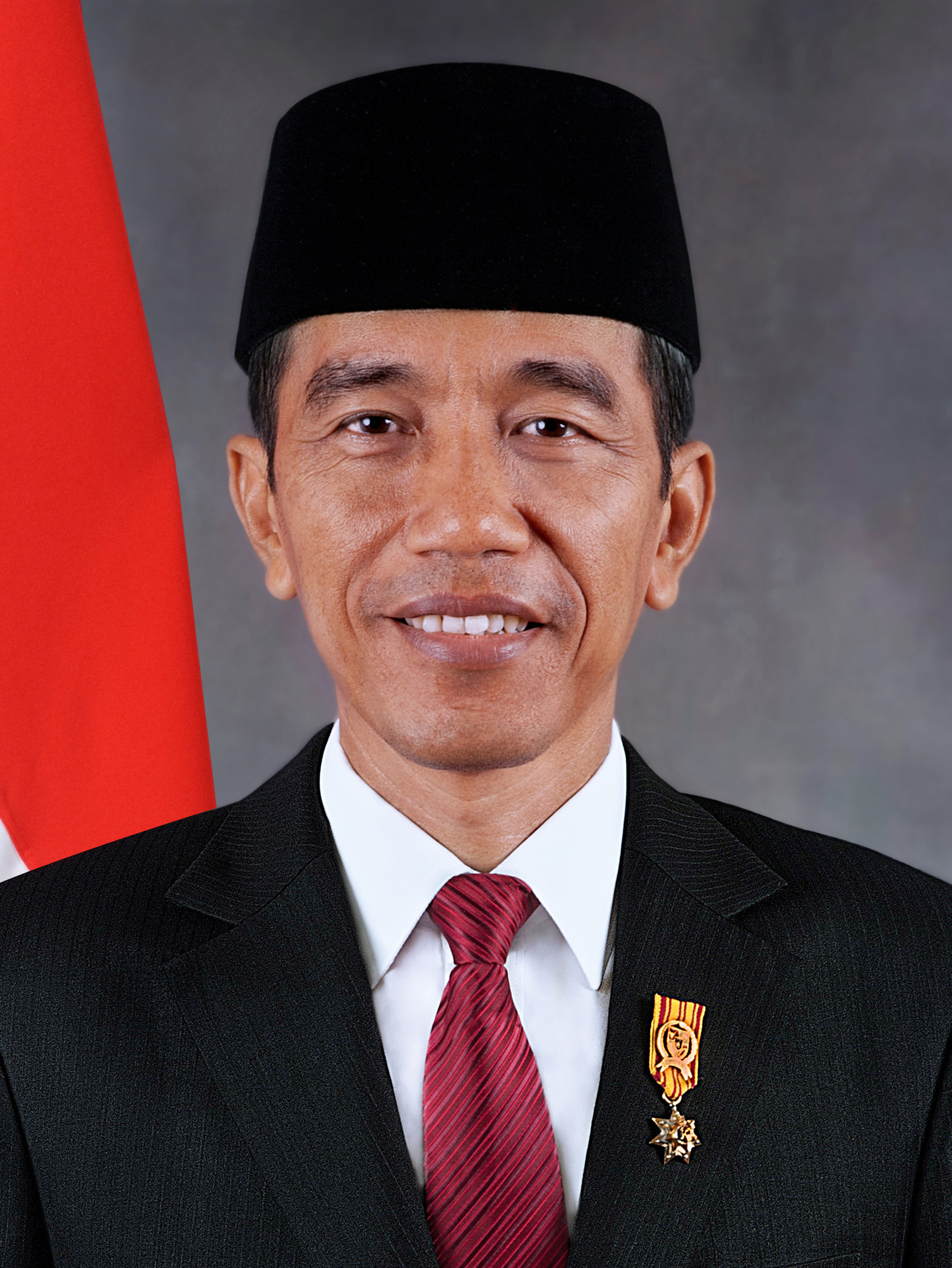
(Indonesia) Indonesia
Joko Widodo, President

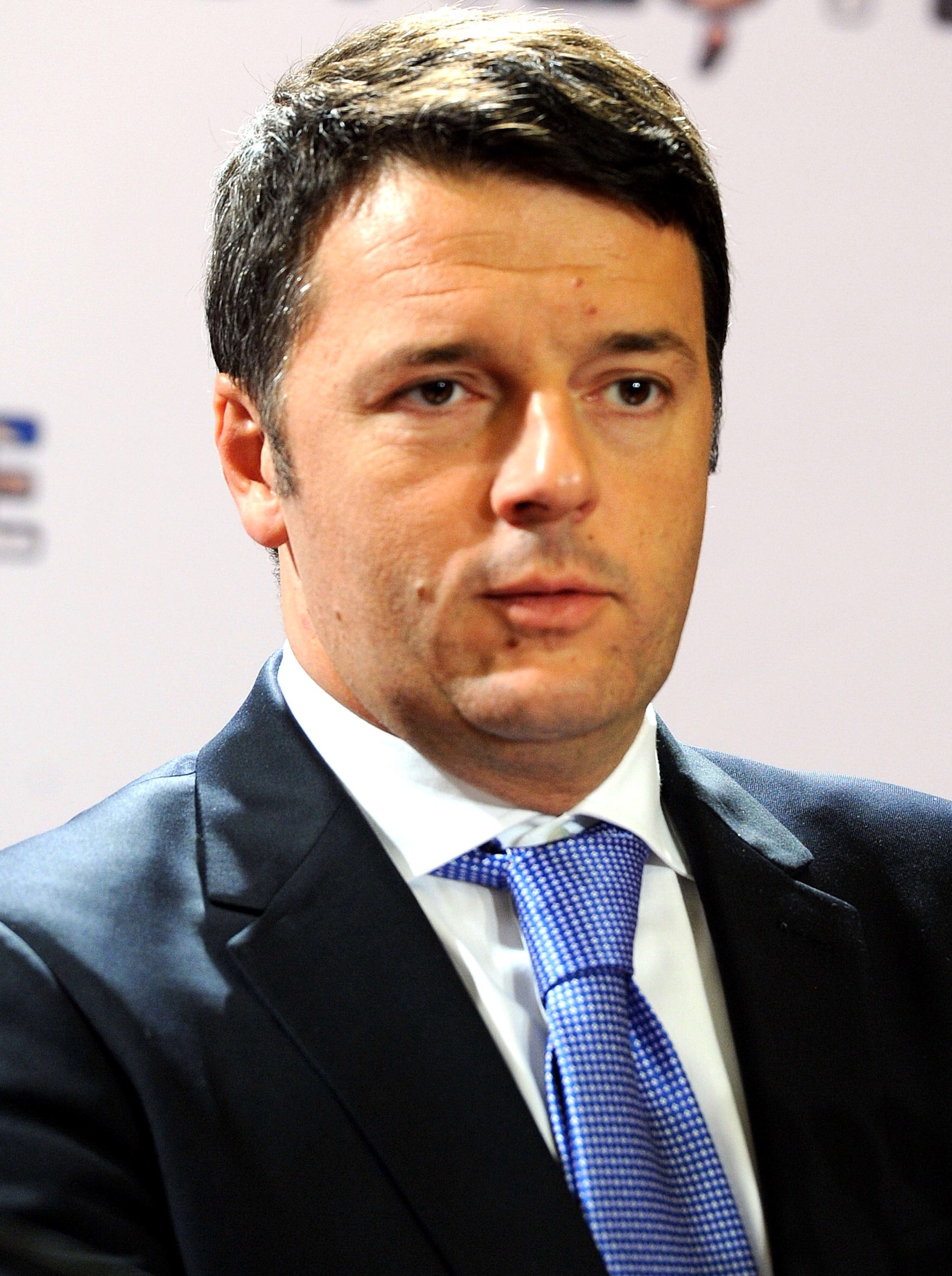
(Italy) Italy
Matteo Renzi, Prime Minister

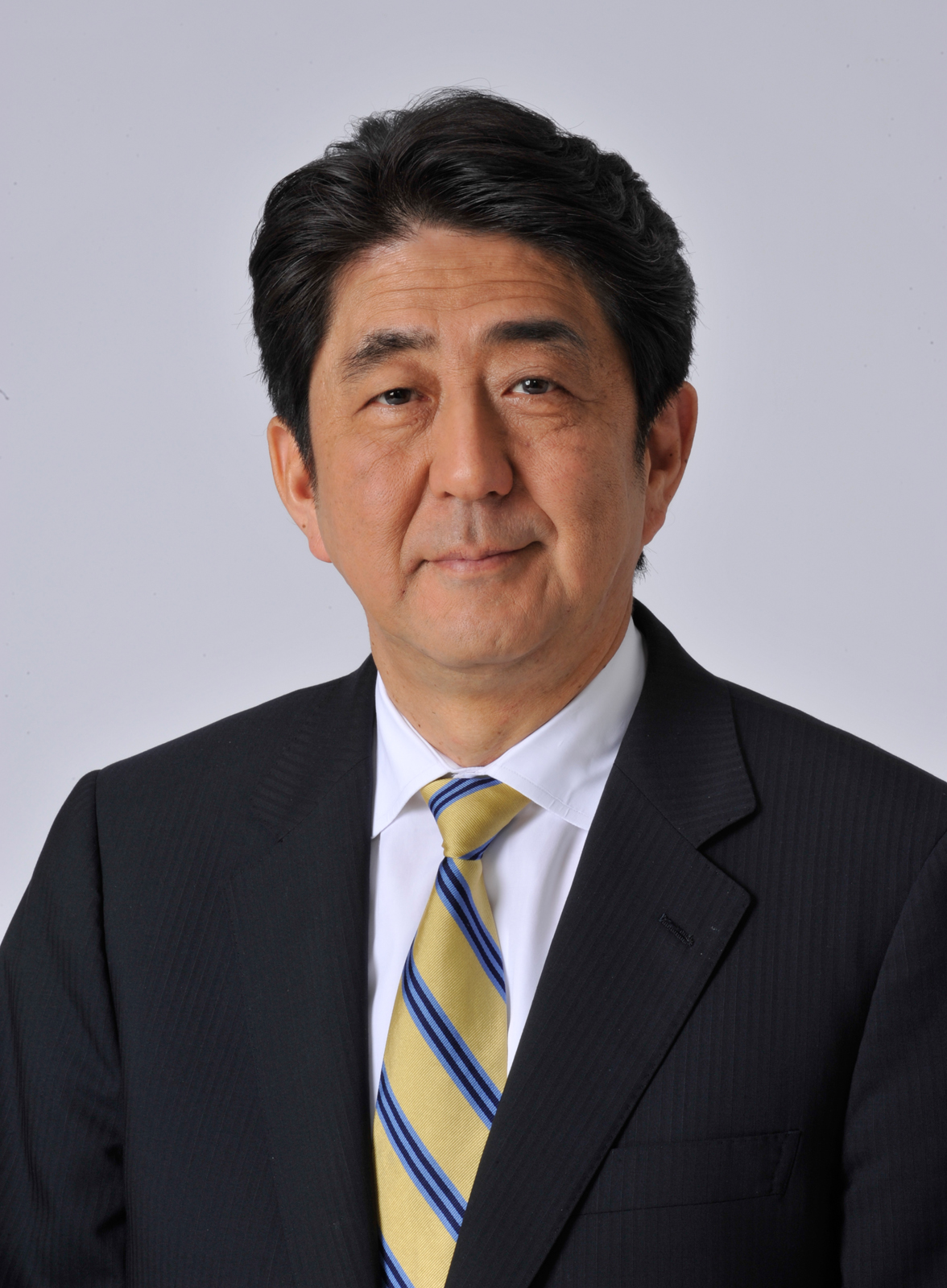
(Japan) Japan
Shinzō Abe, Prime Minister

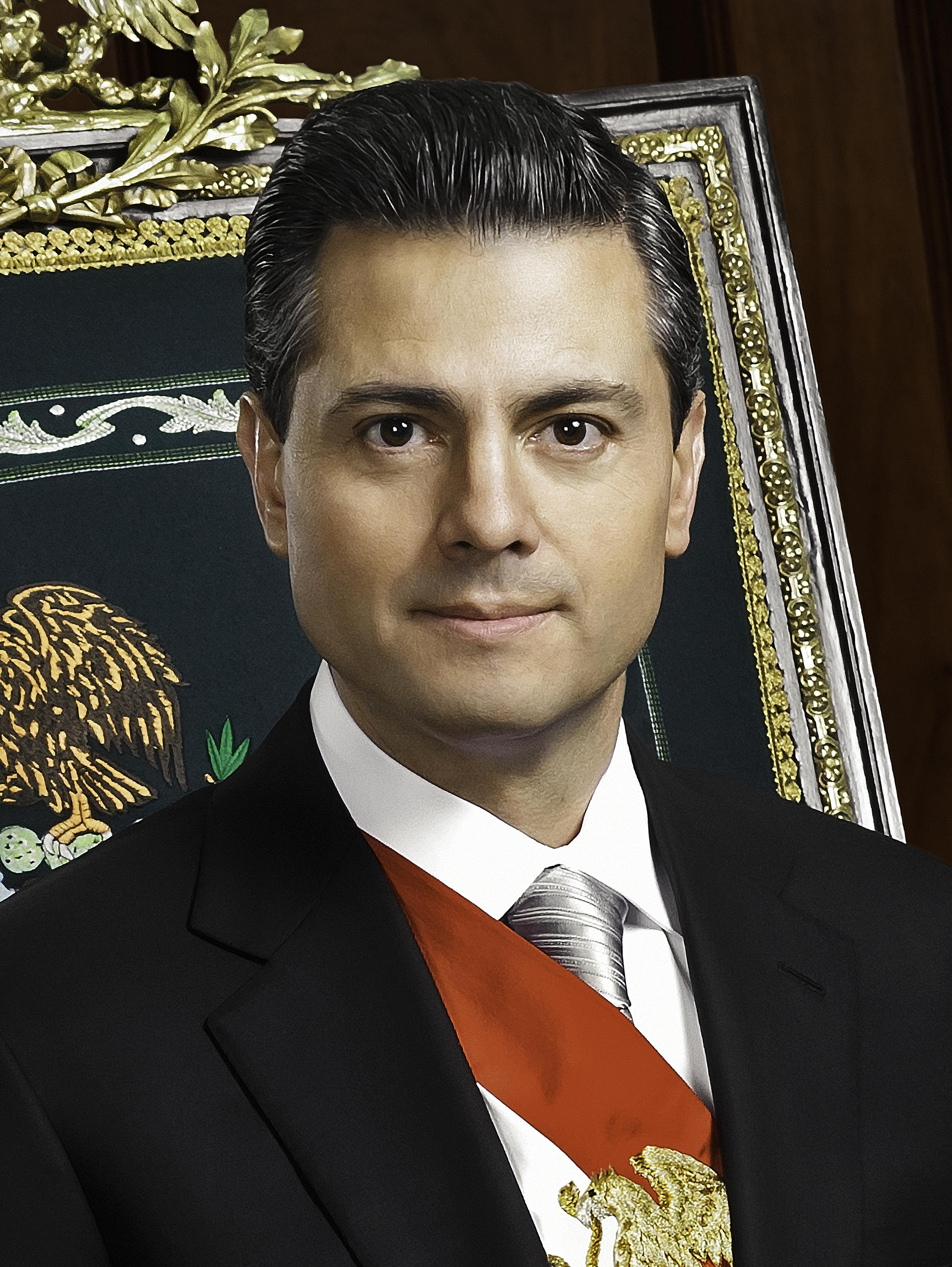
(Mexico) Mexico
Enrique Peña Nieto, President

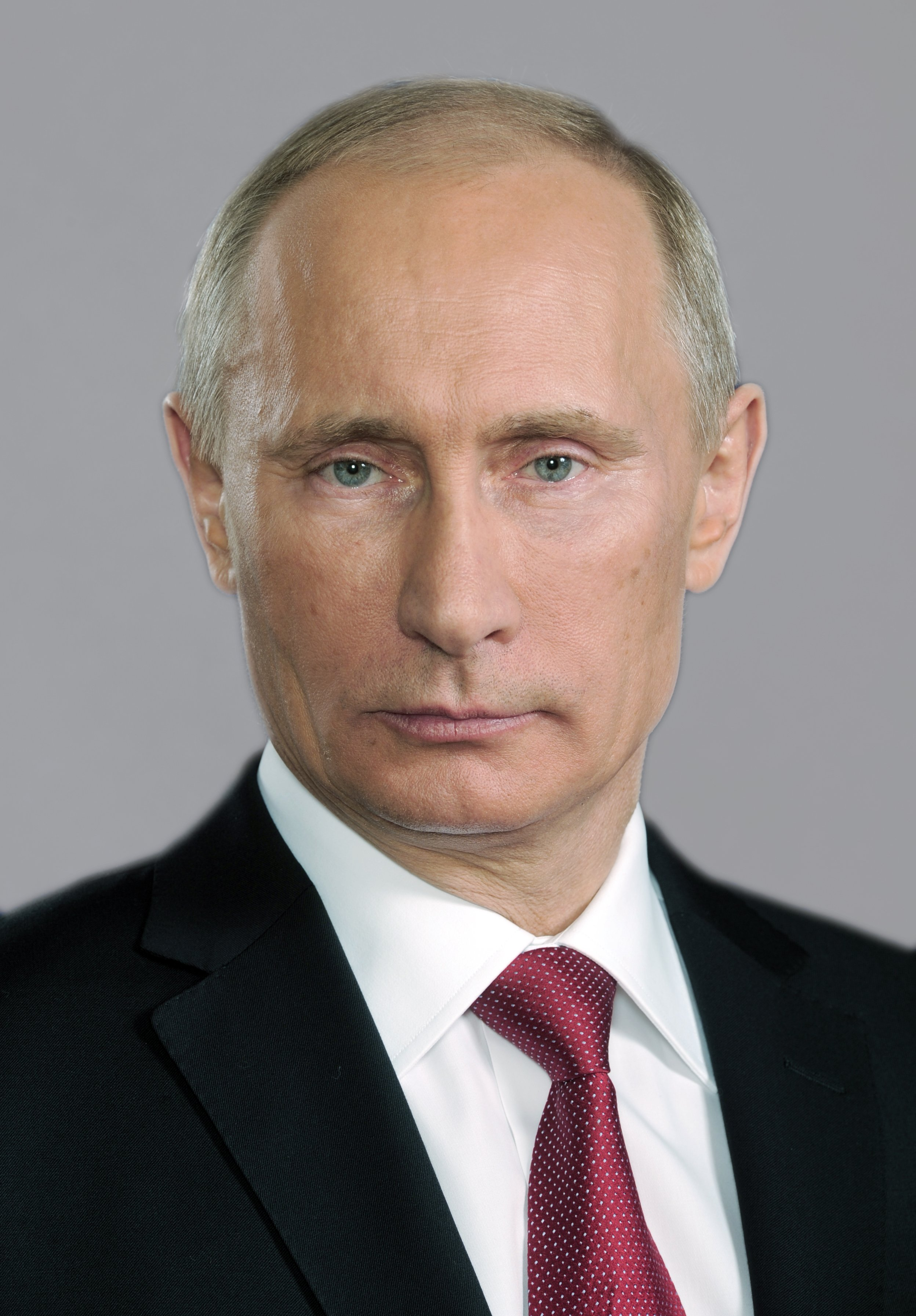
(Russia) Russia
Vladimir Putin, President

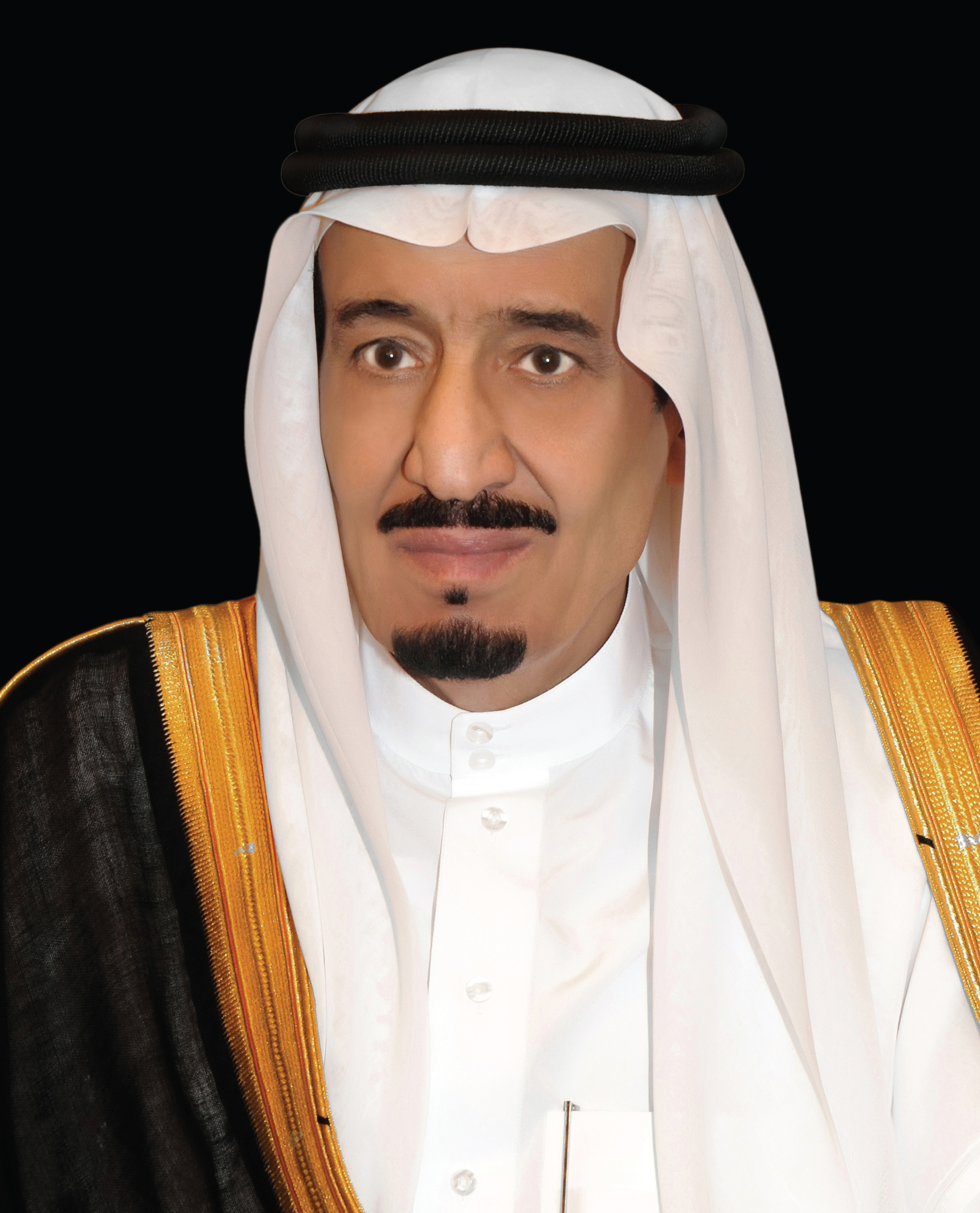
(Saudi Arabia) Saudi Arabia
Salman, Crown Prince

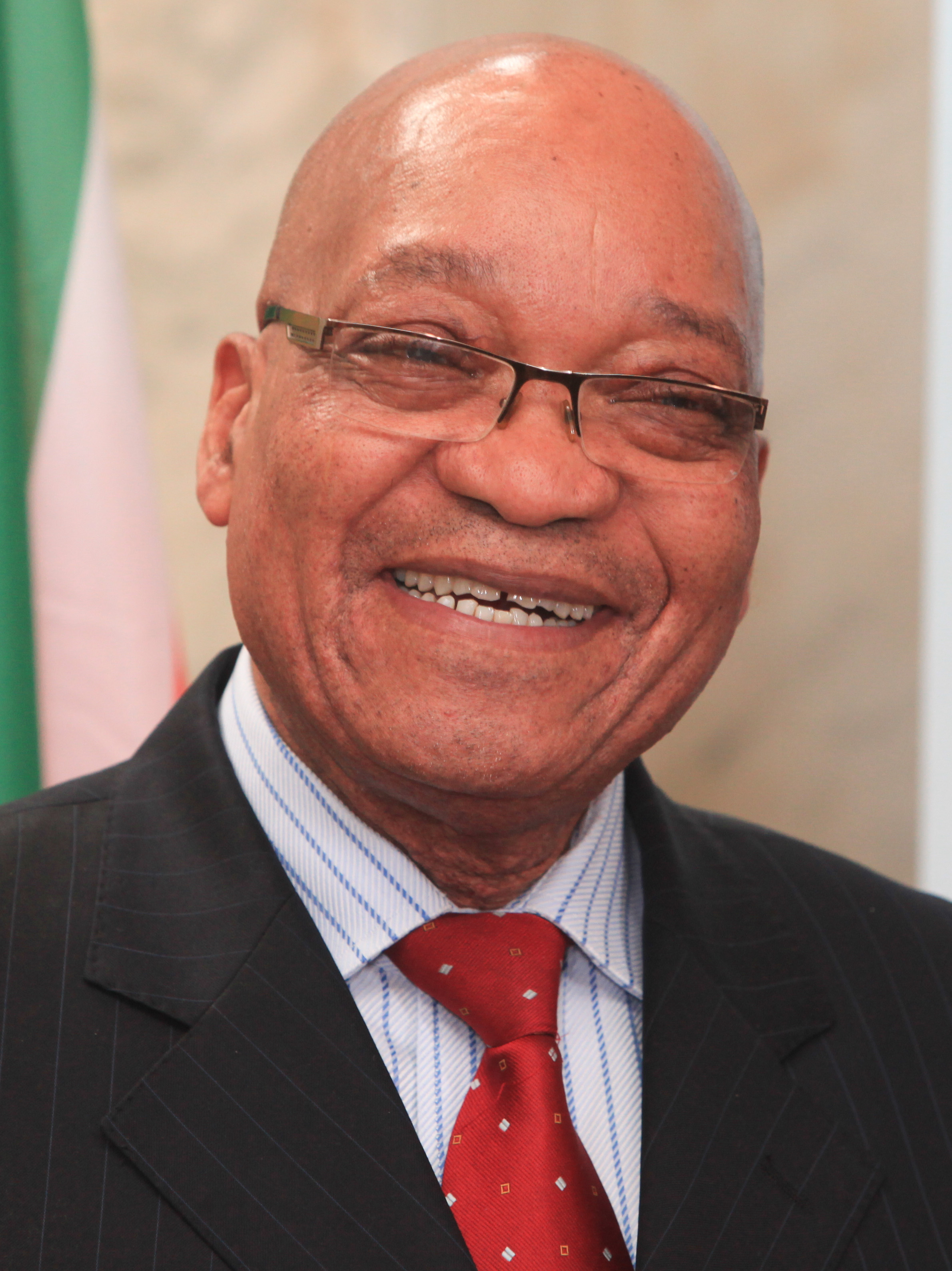
(South Africa) South Africa
Jacob Zuma, President

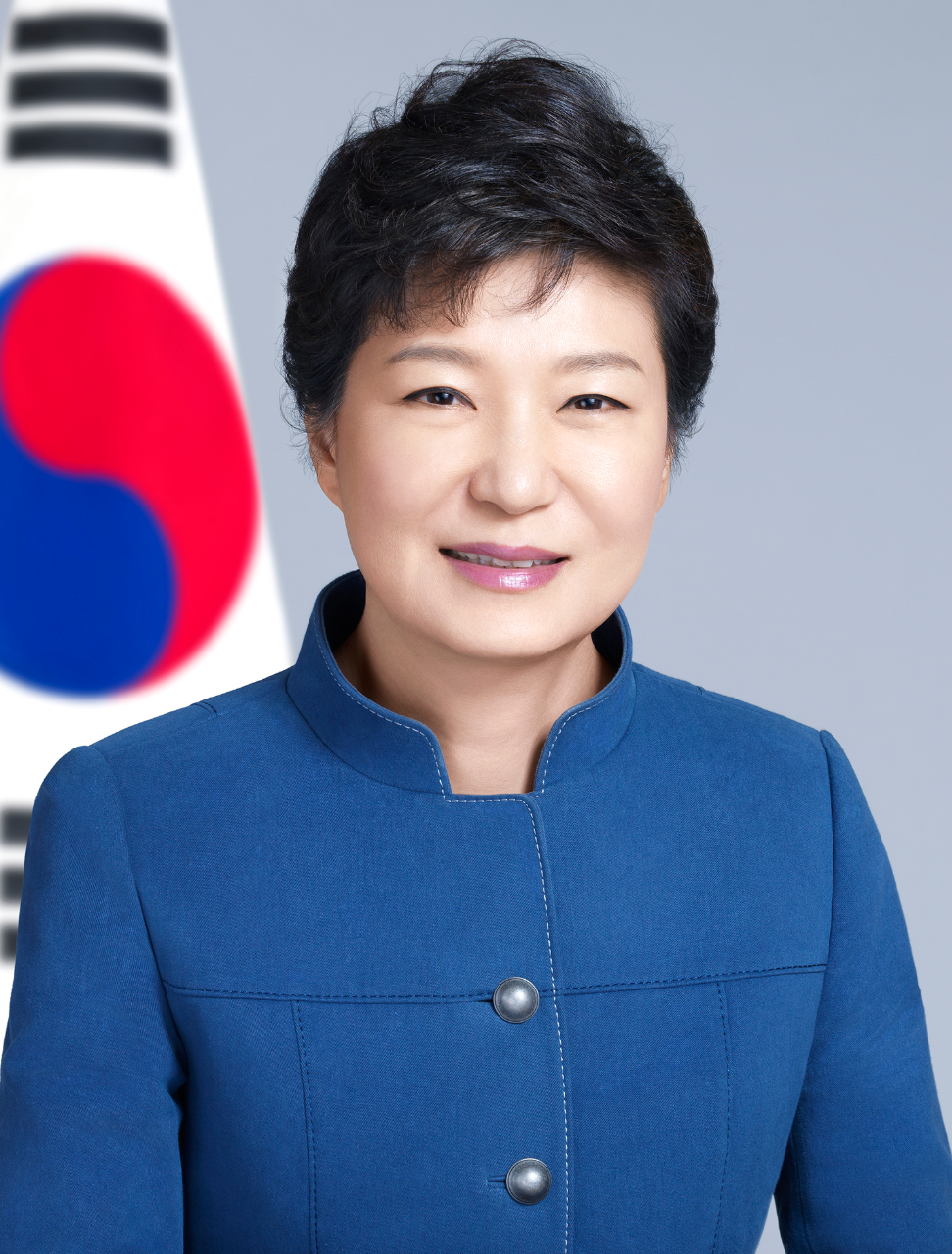
(South Korea) South Korea
Park Geun-hye, President

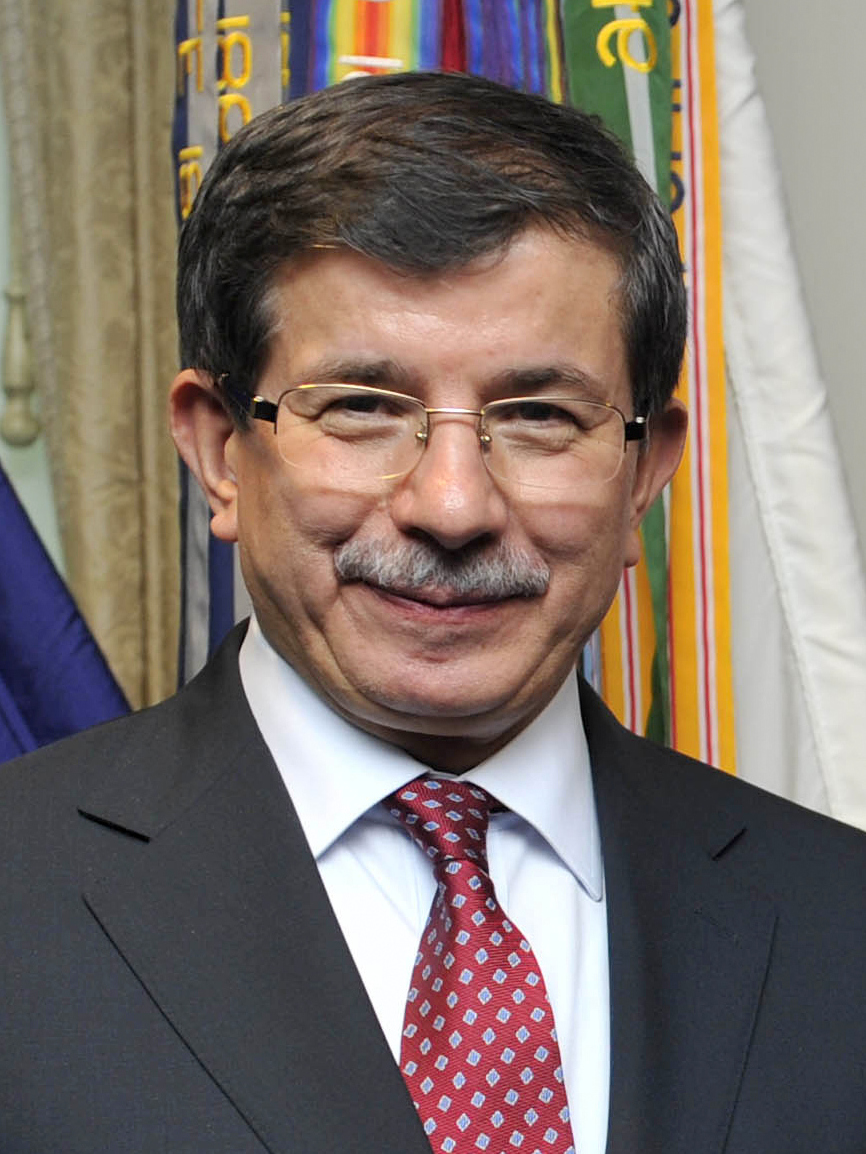
(Turkey) Turkey
Ahmet Davutoğlu, Prime Minister

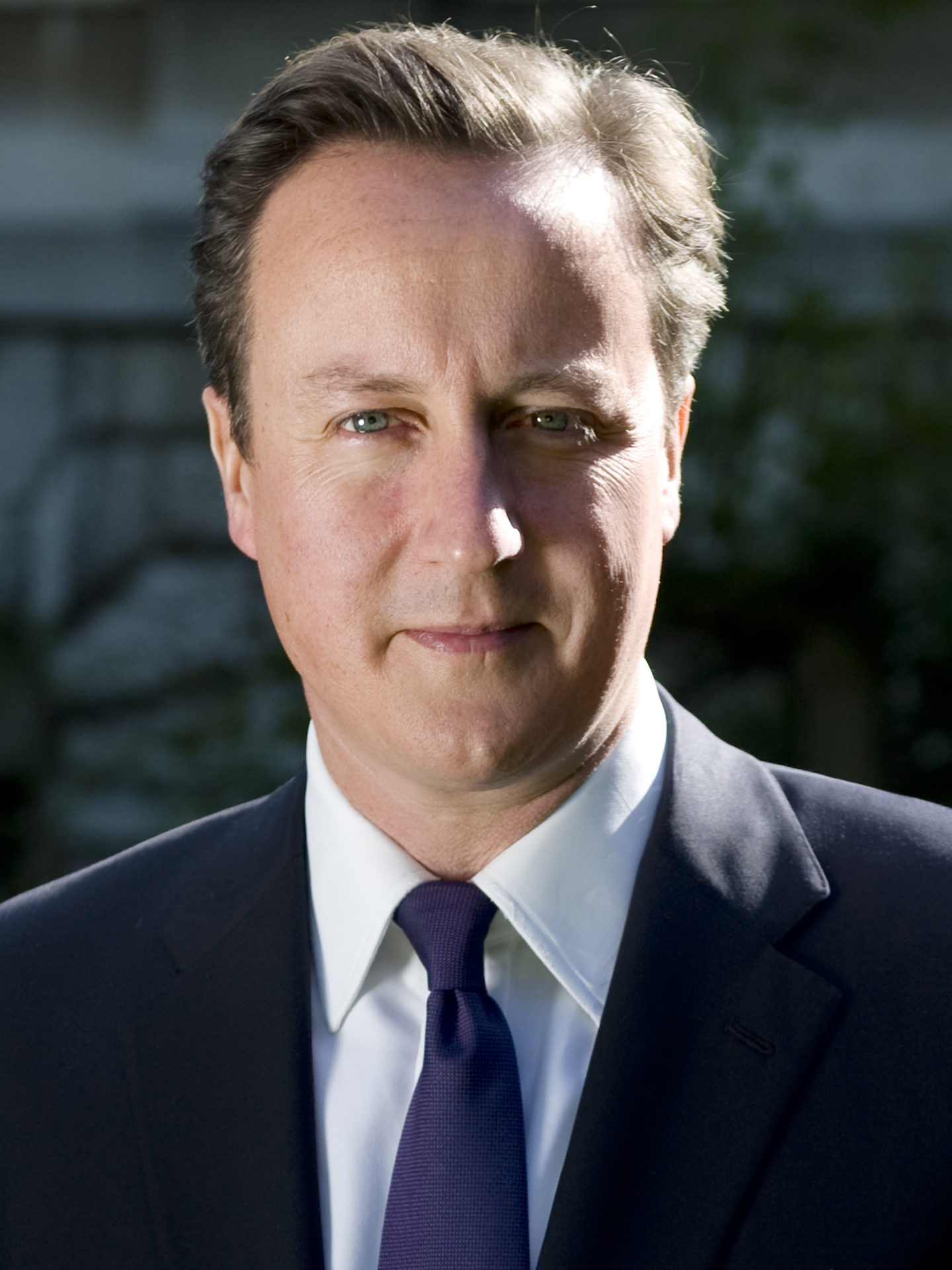
(United Kingdom) United Kingdom
David Cameron, Prime Minister

(United States) United States
Barack Obama, President

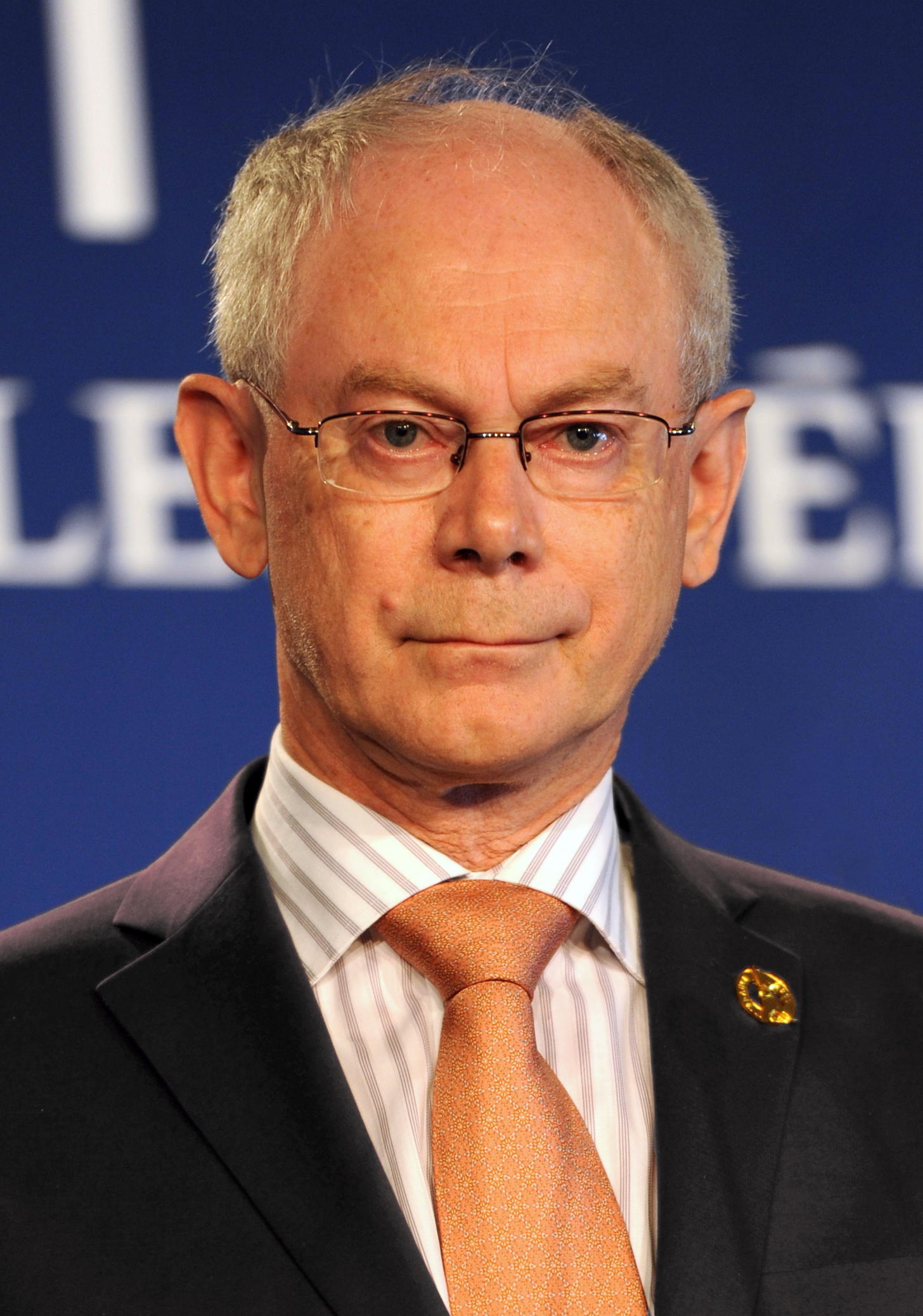
(European Union) European Union
Herman Van Rompuy, President of the European Council

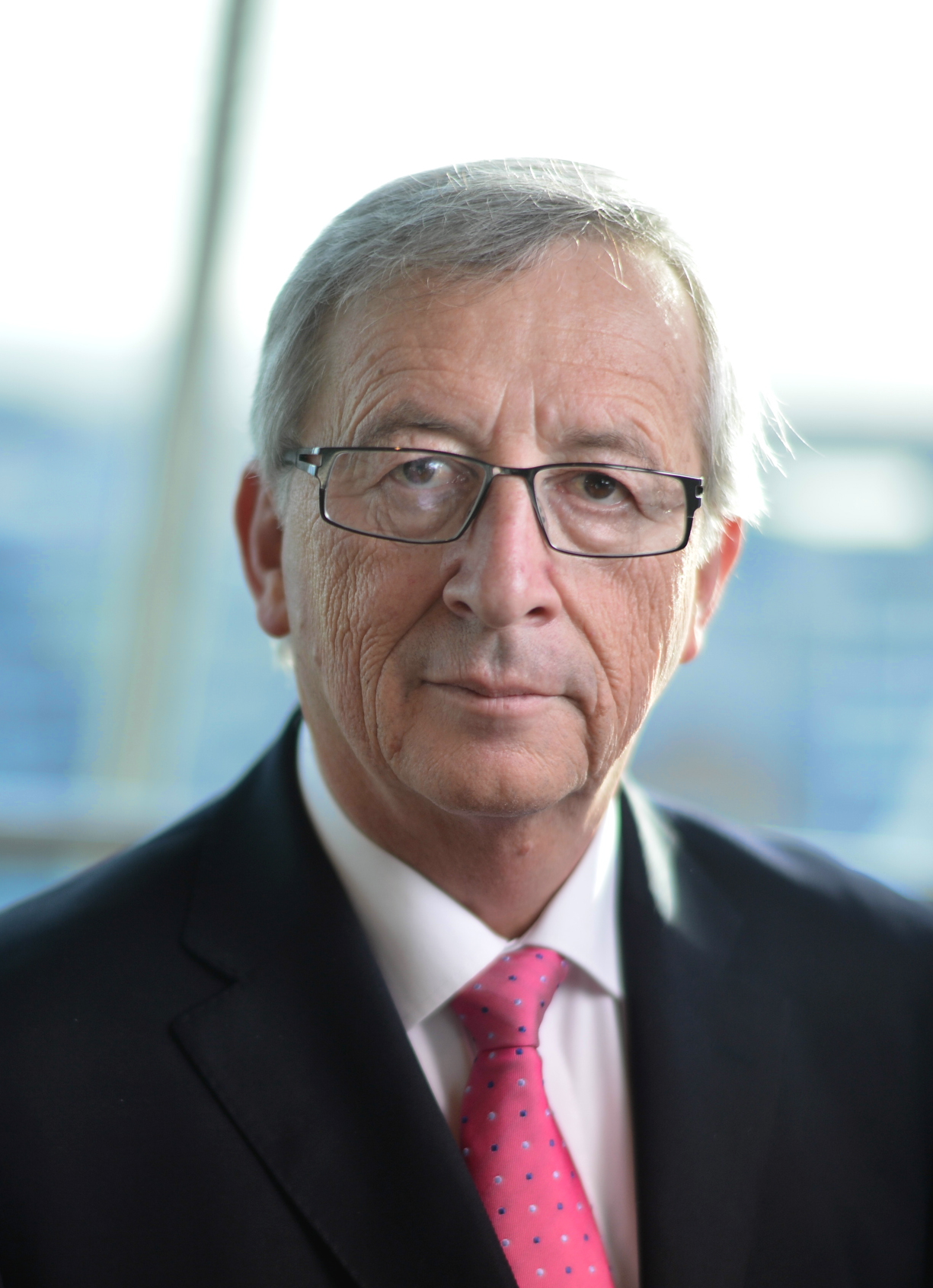
(European Union) European Union
Jean-Claude Juncker, President of the European Commission

=== Invited guests ===
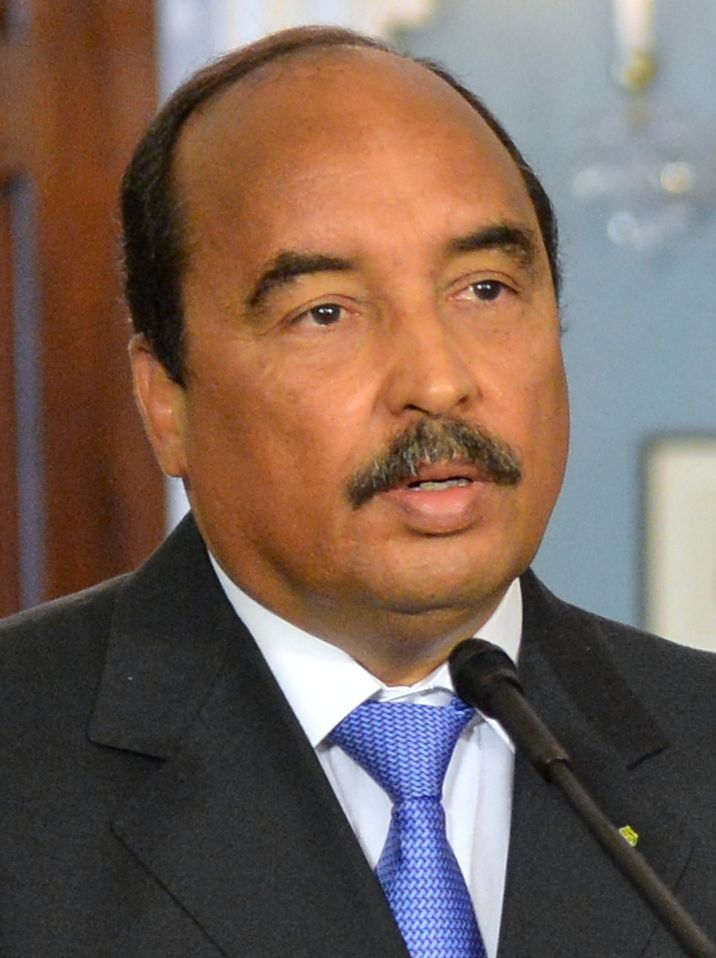
(Mauritania) Mauritania
Mohamed Ould Abdel Aziz, President, 2014 chair of the African Union

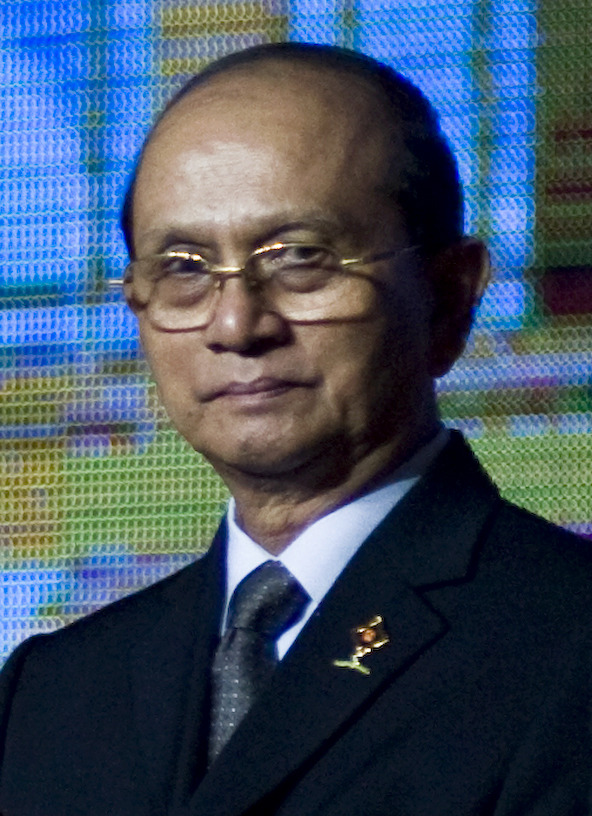
(Myanmar) Myanmar
Thein Sein, President, 2014 Chair of ASEAN

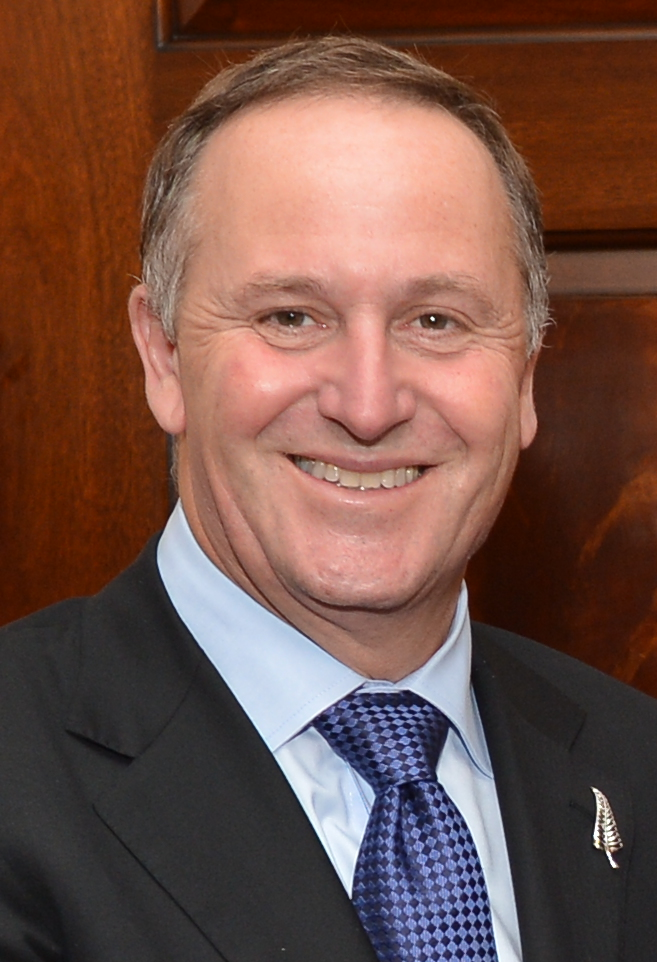
(New Zealand) New Zealand
John Key, Prime Minister

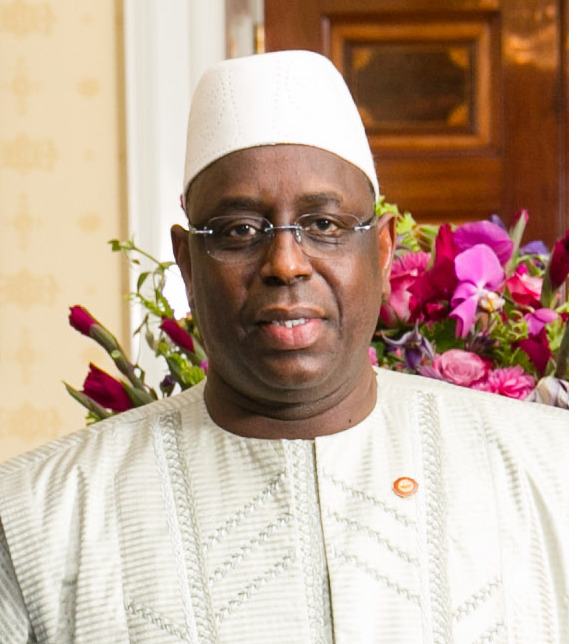
(Senegal) Senegal
Macky Sall, President, president of NEPAD

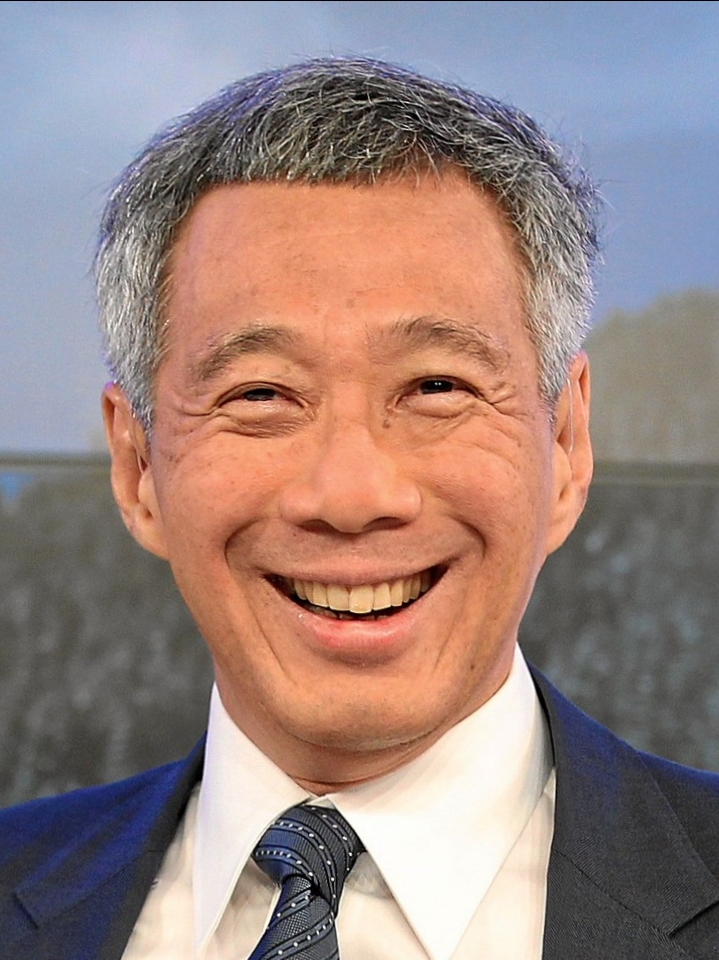
(Singapore) Singapore
Lee Hsien Loong, Prime Minister

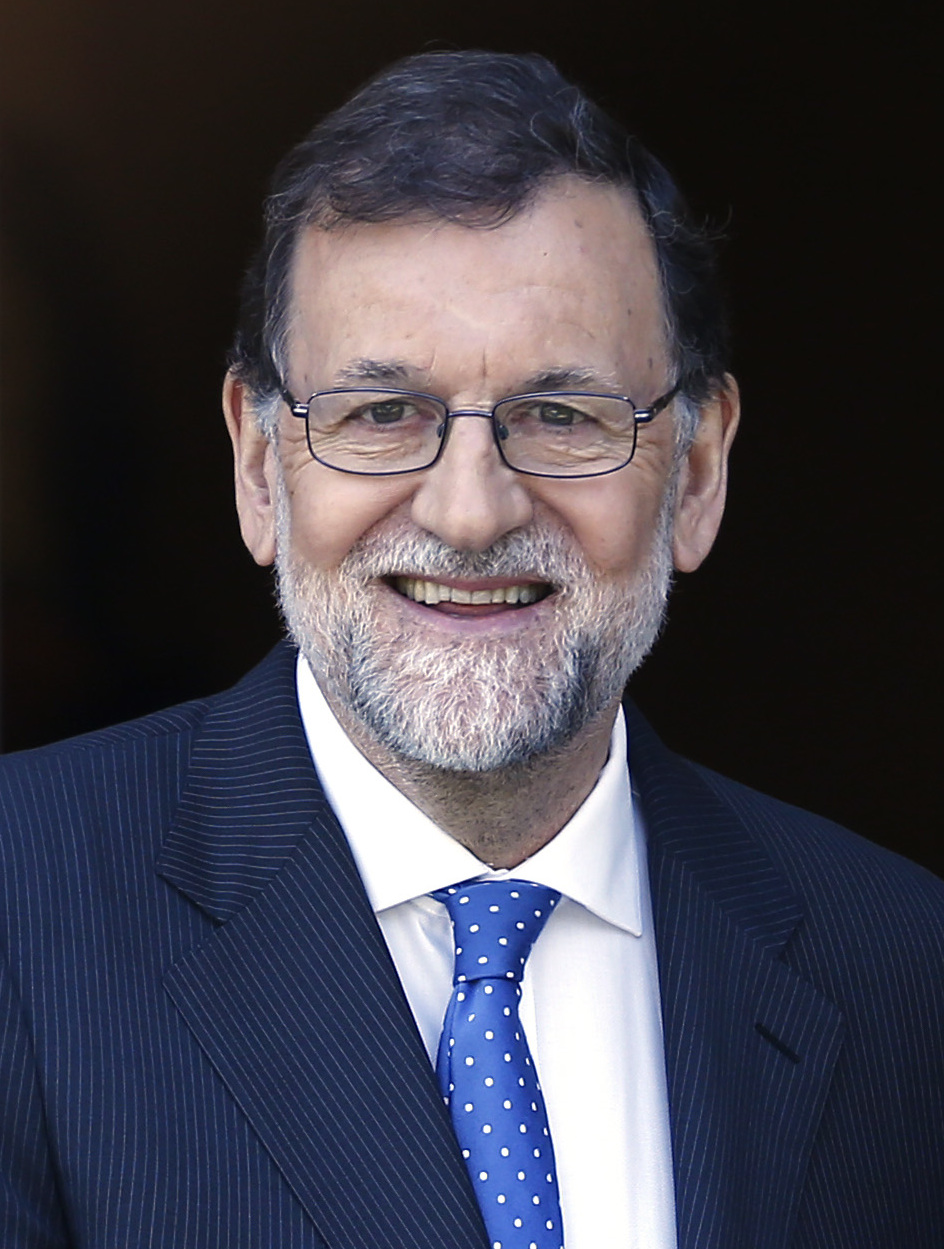
(Spain) Spain
Mariano Rajoy, Prime Minister, Permanent guest invitee

== Outcomes ==
Following the summit, the G20 leaders released a joint communique summarising the points of agreement between them. This focused on economic concerns, highlighting plans to increase global economic growth, create jobs, increase trade and reduce poverty. The communique sets out a goal of increasing economic growth by an extra 2% through commitments made at the summit, and of increasing infrastructure investment through the creation of a four-year infrastructure hub Global Infrastructure Hub, linking government, private sector, development banks and interested international organisations.

The communique also addressed the stability of global systems, mentioning measures to reduce risk in financial systems, improve the stability of banks, make international taxation arrangements fairer, reduce corruption and strengthen global institutions. Although the communique largely focused on economic concerns, other topics such as energy supply, climate change and the Ebola virus epidemic in West Africa were also discussed.
