= Axel Kicillof =

Argentine economist and politician (born 1971)

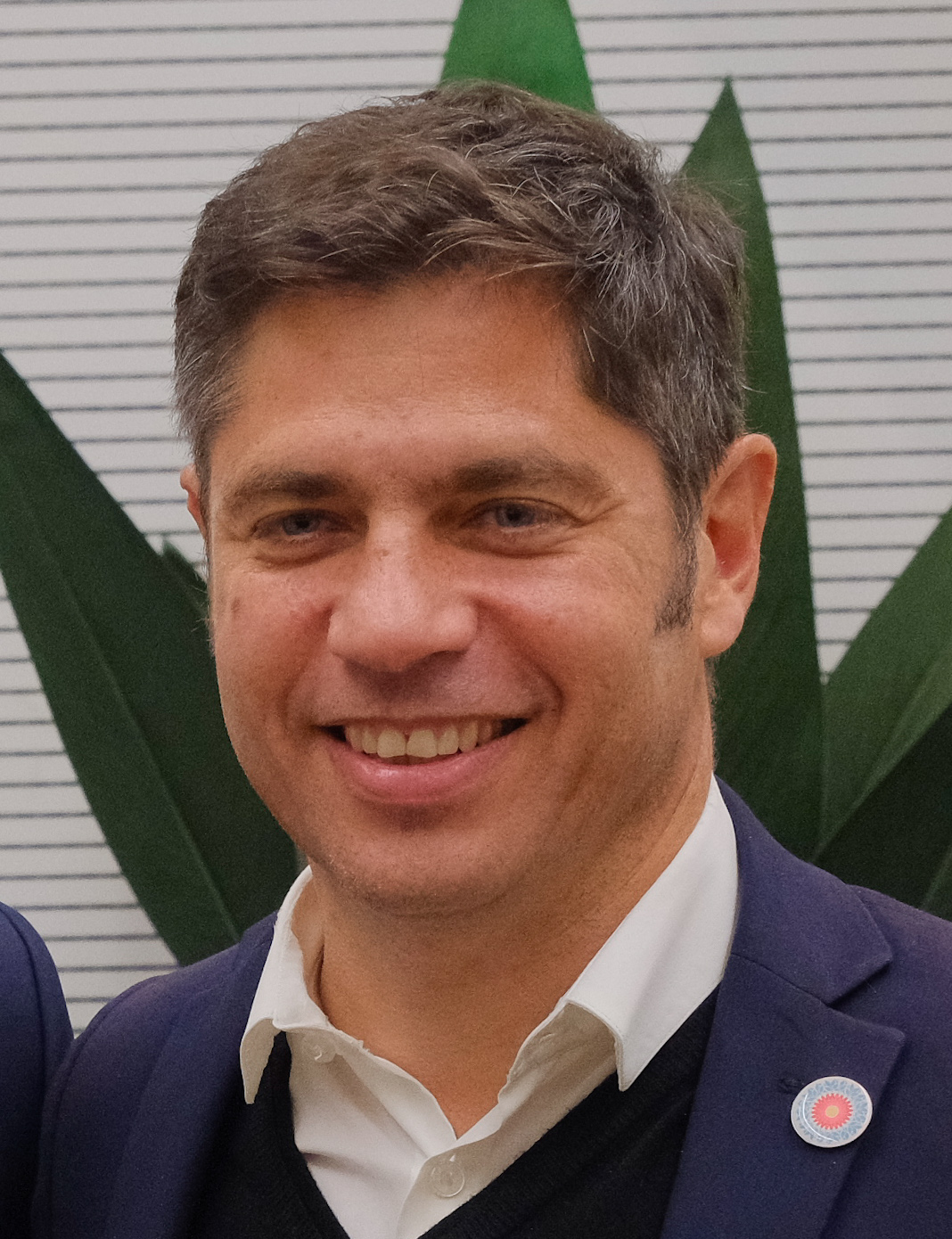
- Kicillof in 2026

Governor of Buenos Aires
- Incumbent
- Assumed office 10 December 2019
- Vice Governor: Verónica Magario
- Preceded by: María Eugenia Vidal

National Deputy
- In office 10 December 2015 – 10 December 2019
- Constituency: City of Buenos Aires

Minister of Economy and Public Finances
- In office 18 November 2013 – 10 December 2015
- President: Cristina Fernández de Kirchner
- Preceded by: Hernán Lorenzino
- Succeeded by: Alfonso Prat-Gay

Personal details
- Born: 25 September 1971 (age 55) Buenos Aires, Argentina
- Party: Justicialist (since 2021)
- Other political affiliations: Front for Victory (2011–2017); Citizen's Unity (2017–2019); Frente de Todos (2019–2023); Homeland Force (since 2023)
- Spouse: Soledad Quereilhac
- Education: University of Buenos Aires

Axel Kicillof (Spanish: [ˈaksel kisiˈlof], born 25 September 1971) is an Argentine economist and politician who has been Governor of Buenos Aires Province since 2019. He is a member of the peronist left political coalition Homeland Force (formerly Union for the Homeland). Kicillof also served as Argentina's Minister of Economy from 2013 to 2015, under the presidency of Cristina Fernández de Kirchner.

Kicillof was instrumental in the 2012 renationalization of YPF. It was on his advice that Fernández de Kirchner decided not to meet holdout bondholder demands to be repaid what they were owed in 2014.

A professor of Economic Sciences at the University of Buenos Aires (he taught there from 1998 to 2010), Kicillof's thinking mixes Marxist elements with Keynesian economics.

== Early life and education ==
Kicillof is the second child of three siblings born to psychologist Nora Barenstein and psychoanalyst Daniel Kicillof; Kicillof was raised in the neighborhood of Recoleta. From 1984 to 1989, Kicillof attended the Colegio Nacional de Buenos Aires. From 1990 to 1995, he studied at the Faculty of Economic Sciences of the University of Buenos Aires (UBA). He graduated magna cum laude, receiving a Degree in Economics with a focus on the public sector. He was the top student in his class of 122. From 1997 to 2005, he pursued graduate studies at UBA, receiving a Doctorate in Economics. His doctoral dissertation, later published as a book, was titled Génesis y estructura de la Teoría General de Lord Keynes (Genesis and Structure of the General Theory of Lord Keynes).

At university, Kicillof was a prominent student leader. He was the head of the student organization Tontos pero No Tanto (TNT, Spanish for Dummies but Not That Much). As a student leader, he was "acclaimed by students like a rock star." From 1989 to 2001, he was an outspoken critic of neoliberalism in Argentina.

== Career ==
=== Academic work ===
Kicillof was an adjunct professor in the Faculty of Economic Sciences at UBA from 1998 to 2010. While he was a professor, Kicillof was noted for his anti-Kirchner and Keynesian writings on the website of CENDA (the Center for Argentine Development, a think tank that he headed). Some of these writings were later removed from the site. In 2003, Kicillof became the first head teaching assistant and later regular adjunct professor of economics II in the sociology track. He also taught economics at the Escuela Superior de Comercio Carlos Pellegrini, the Universidad Nacional de Quilmes, and the Universidad Nacional de General Sarmiento.

At the postgraduate level, Kicillof was professor of economics in the masters and doctoral programs for social sciences at the Institute of Economic and Social Development at the Universidad Nacional de General Sarmiento (UNGS-IDES). In the Latin American Social Sciences Institute (FLACSO), he was the Professor of History of Economic Thought in the masters program for Public Policy for Development with Social Inclusion. Earlier, Kicillof taught economics in the masters and doctoral programs for Political Economics with the Argentinian Economy, specializing in two subjects, the History of Economic Thought and Microeconomics and Macroeconomics, Fundamental Concepts of the Political Economy. Kicillof also taught a course entitled "Differentiation of Capital in the Field of Health" in the faculty of economics at the University of Buenos Aires. Since November 2010, Kicillof has been an assistant researcher for CONICET. At the Center of Studies for the Planning of Development (CEPLAD) at the Institute of Economics Research (University of Buenos Aires), he was appointed the deputy director and served from 2006 to 2010.

=== Economic views ===
Kicillof is considered a heterodox economist, favoring an import substitution model over free trade. He has argued that there is no direct correlation between the money supply and inflation, and associates a trade surplus with stronger economic performance than a trade deficit. Commentators have criticized his approach, with Laura Di Marco of the conservative La Nación writing that Kicillof's "economic team" was "anchored in the ideology of TNT economists who believed and believe that the state" should aim to establish a post-capitalist "revolutionary utopia". Journalist Jorge Lanata also questioned Kicillof's explanations on inflation and exchange rate pressures, contrasting them with the views of Keynes. Argentina experienced high levels of inflation during his tenure as Minister of Economy.

=== Other professional activities ===
Between 1990 and 1995, Kicillof worked in various advisory capacities for National Motor Vehicle Transport Commission (CONTA), Tintorerías Ecológicas Dolphin System, the Eduardo Sívori Museum (pro bono), Transportes Vidal S.A., SARTOR S.A., CALED S.A., Molinari S.A., Clínica Cirugía Plástica, Centro Médico Bacigaluppi, Center for Education on Sexuality Research and Therapy (CETIS), Center for Urology and Male Health (CEUSA), among other clients. He was a part-time financial and information systems manager at the Center for Diagnosis and Treatment of Allergies in 1990–95. He served as research assistant (1993) and junior economist at the Inter-American Center for Macroeconomic Studies from 1994 to 1995 and concurrently served as adviser on the National Commission for Promotion and Development of Patagonia in 1994.

In 1995–96, he served as adviser to the Undersecretariat of Technical Administrative Coordination in the Secretariat of Social Development. In 1997, he acted as technical consultant to the Minister Secretary General of the Executive Branch in connection with the development of the government's social plan for 1998–2000. In 1997–1998, he was a consultant to the consulting firm M-Unit. In 1998 he was a Project Manager for AperNet. In August 2009, Kicillof was appointed general manager of the Economic and Financial Area of Aerolíneas Argentinas, a position he held until February 2010, where he worked on the airline's 2011–2014 business plan. In December 2011, he joined the board of directors of Siderar, representing the shares held by Argentina's National Social Security Administration (ANSES).

== Tenure as finance minister ==
With the start of the second term of Cristina Fernández de Kirchner as president of Argentina, Kicillof was appointed Secretary for Economic Policy and Developmental Planning, integrating the organizational chart of officials of the Ministry of Economy and Public Finance of the Nation, which was headed by Hernán Lorenzino. After that, on 18 November 2013, Kicillof officially became Minister of Economy.

=== YPF ===
Kicillof was instrumental in the renationalization of YPF. Fernández de Kirchner named Kicillof to the post of Secretary, or Deputy Minister, for Economic Policy and Development Planning in December 2011. He took academic leave to assume this post. In this position, Kicillof oversaw the controversial 2012 nationalization of YPF, the Argentine oil company then controlled by the Spanish energy firm Repsol. It was the largest expropriation in Argentina's history. He justified this action as part of a needed reversal of the Argentinian economic policies of the 1990s, when the peso had been pegged to the dollar and government assets had been sold off. In connection with his oversight of the seizure of YPF, Kicillof served as a Director of YPF SA starting in June 2012. His power at YPF was equivalent to that of a CFO. He has been called "the ideologue of the expropriation of YPF".

In April 2012, Kicillof told the Argentine Congress that the country would not pay $10 billion in compensation for YPF, as demanded by Repsol. An agreement was ultimately reached with Repsol in November 2013, whereby the latter would be compensated for a 51% stake in YPF with approximately US$5 billion in 10-year corporate bonds.

=== Minister of Economy ===
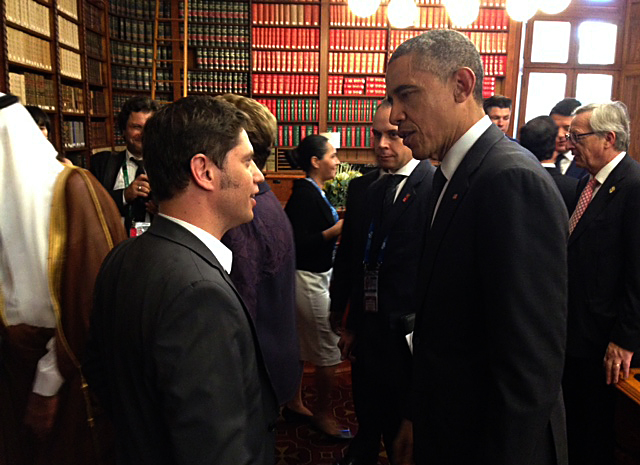
Kicillof with Barack Obama during the 2014 G20 Brisbane summit

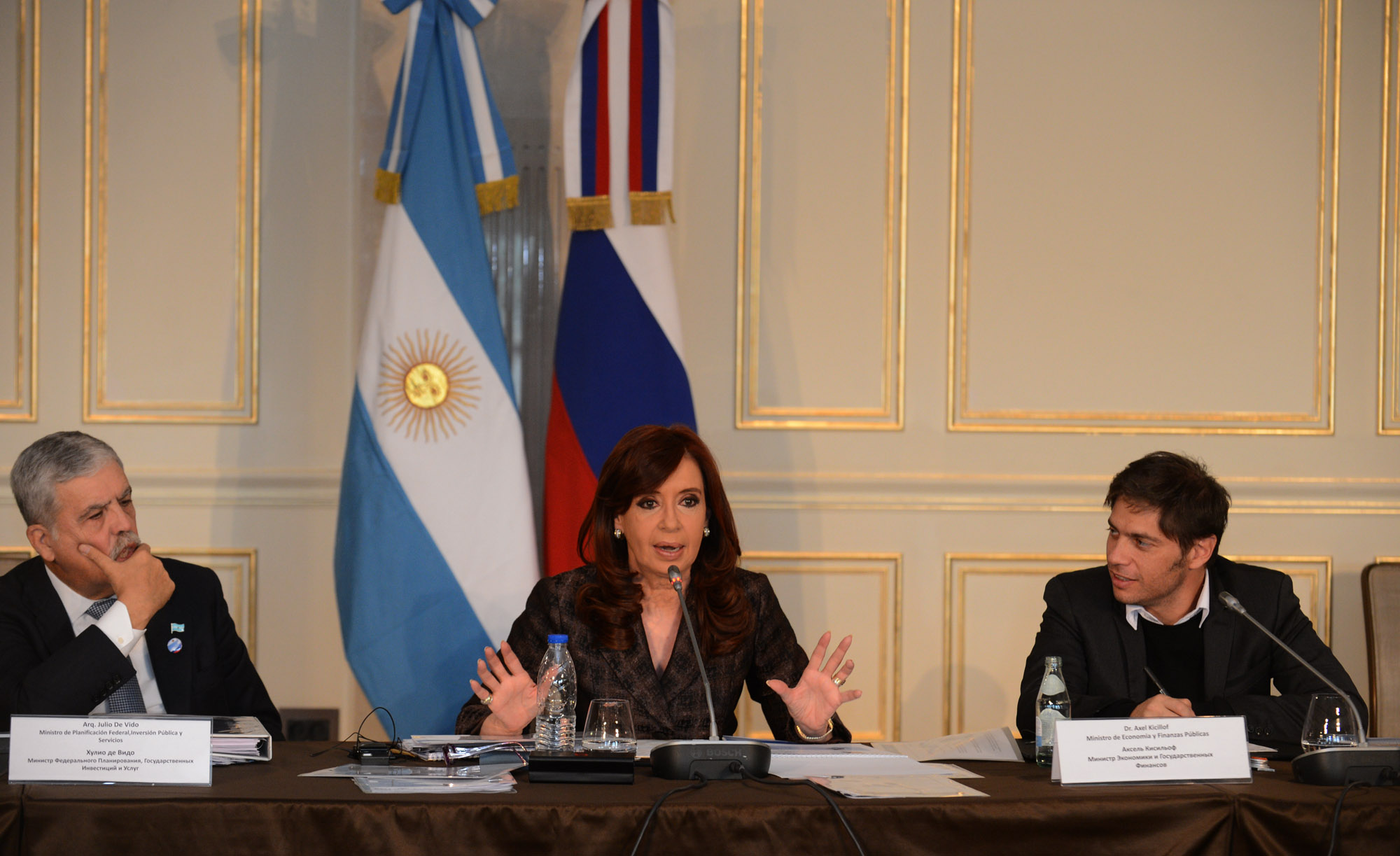
Kicillof (right) with the then president Cristina Fernández de Kirchner and Planning Minister, Julio de Vido, during a state visit to Russia, 2015

On 18 November 2013, Fernández de Kirchner named Kicillof to the post of Minister of Economy. Newsweek reported in July 2014 that Kicillof enjoyed "the full backing of Argentina's President Cristina Kirchner".

A profile of Kicillof in The New York Times of 26 January 2014 was headlined "The Influential Minister Behind Argentina's Economic Shift". According to The New York Times, Kicillof was leading "a shift in the government's policies" as Argentina sought "to regain access to global financial markets, following the country's default on its foreign debt in 2002". The profile described Kicillof as "mercurial ... a scholar with rockabilly-style sideburns and an aversion to business suits", and said that he was "emerging as the face of policy shifts that are sending tremors through financial markets around the developing world", as well as "wielding greater influence over an array of areas, from Argentina's oil industry to the government's attempts to slow capital flight and improve relations with international creditors." Noting that Kicillof's writings "use Marxist concepts to interpret the work of the British economist John Maynard Keynes", The New York Times indicated that Kicillof was seeking to "assert greater state control over Argentina's economy at a time when growth is slowing significantly and inflation is soaring."

When Argentina devalued the peso in January 2014, Kicillof placed blame on the exchange-market speculation by Juan José Aranguren, head of Shell; later in the year, when the peso was at its lowest ever position in relation to the dollar, he blamed "vulture funds" from the United States. El País reported in August 2014 that Kicillof had recently prevailed over the president of the Central Bank, Juan Carlos Fábrega, in two debates, including the question of whether to pay holdout creditors. El País stated that Kicillof had become "one of the most powerful officials" in the Fernández de Kirchner government and that he now not only ran the Ministry of Economy but also wielded considerable influence over other ministries and executive agencies. Kicillof told the Senate in 2014: "There is a global consensus that there is no default in Argentina." He added: "There is no economic or financial reasons why the dollar is at 15 pesos." Nevertheless, international debt-rating agencies, such as Standard and Poor's, published indications of Argentina's default status.

=== Debt dispute ===
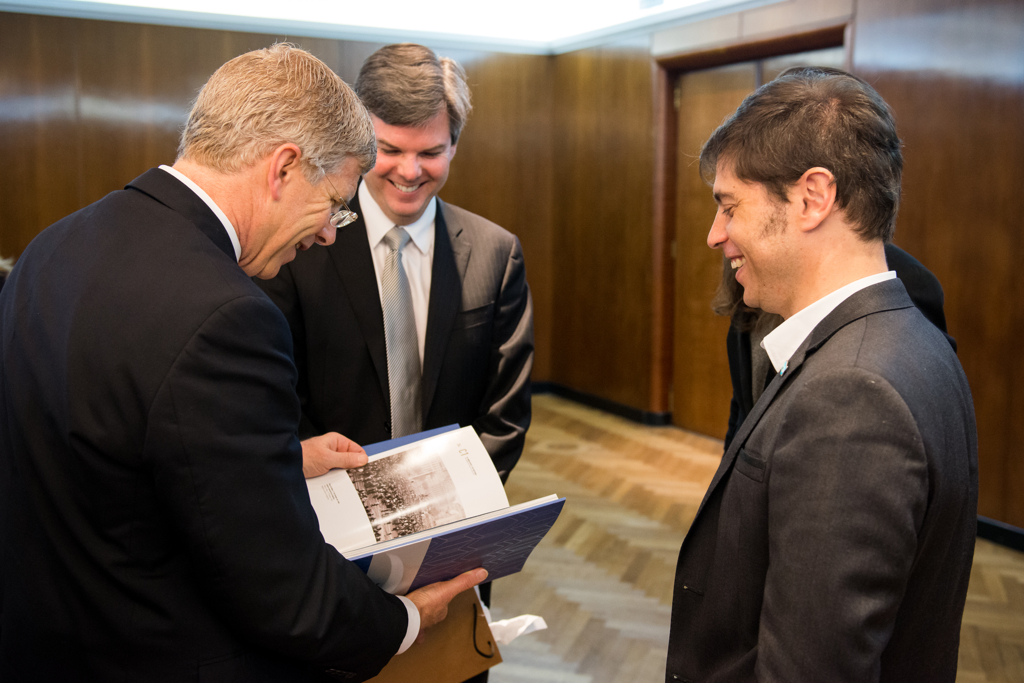
Kicillof with the then United States Deputy Secretary of Energy, Daniel Poneman, in 2014

Kicillof was a central figure in the 2014 dispute with holdout bondholders, particularly with NML Capital Limited, the Cayman Islands-based hedge fund demanding US$832 million for Argentine bonds purchased for US$49 million in the secondary market in 2008. Argentine debt restructuring initiated in 2005 had been accepted by over 92% of bondholders, and these bonds had been serviced on schedule since then. A 2014 ruling by a District Court Judge Thomas Griesa blocked bondholders' payments for New York-issued bonds. The ruling, which granted holdouts above-market demands, had the contractually-stipulated effect of stopping payments to bondholders until holdout demands were met and in turn led to demands from restructured bondholders (the 92%) that their payments be released.

On 3 July 2014, Newsweek reported that Argentina was "pinning its hopes on the star power and persuasive skills of its young economy minister, Axel Kicillof, to broker an 11th-hour deal." Noting his refusal to meet with the holdout creditors, who were based in New York, Newsweek stated that "even after a U.S. judge appointed mediator Daniel Pollack to assist Argentina in forging a long-awaited settlement with its unpaid creditors, Kicillof traveled to New York in late June – but only to give an explosive speech at the U.N. lambasting the U.S. courts for driving Argentina's economy to the brink." Meanwhile, Kicillof kept the holdout creditors "dangling". Newsweek stated: "Even if it was not a deliberate move to tweak Argentina's inflamed creditors, [Kicillof's trip to New York and speech at the U.N.] worked: for the past 30 days, hedge funds such as Elliott have stepped up the urgency of their rhetoric, exhorting Argentina in editorials and emails to the press to come to the negotiating table." Later in July, Kicillof led a negotiating team that met with Pollack in New York to try to resolve the dispute with Argentina's holdout creditors. Despite hopes that government representatives would deal directly with the creditors, reported The Wall Street Journal, Kicillof said before the meeting that his delegation would not meet with them, but only with Pollack.

The president of Argentina's Central Bank, Juan Carlos Fábrega, advocated paying off the holdout creditors while Kicillof argued against it. It was Kicillof, reported Business Insider, who persuaded Fernández de Kirchner to ignore the group of private bankers trying to strike a deal. Kicillof had asked Fernández de Kirchner to reject a "deal between NML and private bankers — who may have purchased NML's bonds." He called the deal "a scam with depositors' savings". Kicillof represented Argentina at the November 2014 G-20 Summit in Brisbane, Australia, where he called on member nations to adopt measures against vulture funds. The importance of “having sovereign debt process that is orderly and foreseeable” was ultimately adopted as Point 12 in the Brisbane G-20 Summit's 21-point declaration.

In a March 2015 statement, Kicillof contrasted the holdout creditors with "normal creditors" and predicted that other "vulture funds" would materialize and cause further problems for Argentina in the future. Kicillof accused Judge Thomas Griesa, who had ordered Argentina to pay the holdout creditors on their terms, of making "a legal stew" that prevented Argentina from paying other creditors. Griesa's numerous rulings attempting to block bondholder payments were described by Kicillof as "absurd rulings with limited effects". Citibank Argentina and numerous other banks both within and outside the U.S. had been improperly ordered by Griesa not to pay bondholders, and ultimately had the orders suspended or reversed by Griesa himself.

== Congressman ==
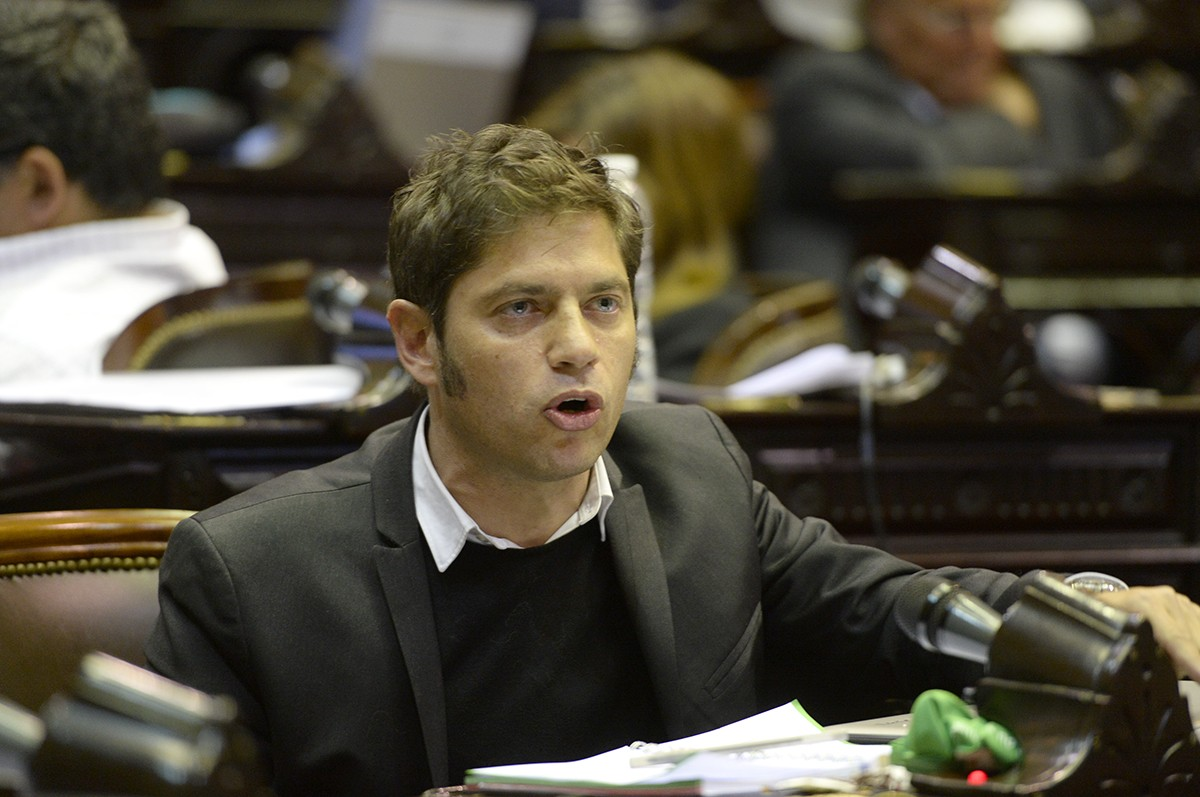
Kicillof as a National Deputy, speaking during the debate on the Voluntary Interruption of Pregnancy bill in 2018.

Ahead of the 2015 general election, Kicillof was announced as the first candidate in the Front for Victory list to the Argentine Chamber of Deputies in the City of Buenos Aires. With 437,380 votes (22.37%), the FPV list came second, but with enough votes for Kicillof to make it past the D'Hondt cut and be elected.

As a national deputy, Kicillof formed part of the parliamentary commissions on commerce, finance, budgets, industry, Mercosur, regional economies, small and medium-sized enterprises, and tax norms; he also presided over the commission on economic affairs and served as secretary of the Permanent Bicameral Commission on Foreign Debt. In 2018, he voted in favor of the Voluntary Interruption of Pregnancy Bill, which would have legalized abortion in Argentina. The bill passed the Chamber, but was later struck down by the Senate.

Kicillof authored bills to declare the access to water, gas, and electricity services a human right, promote formal employment to the Argentine transgender population, guarantee gender equality in employment, and formalize the Renovate, Ahora 12, PROCREAR and PROGRESAR programmes, flagship policies of his tenure as finance minister, among others.

== Governor of Buenos Aires Province ==
Between 2016 and 2019, Kicillof and a close group of aides began a grassroots campaign across Buenos Aires Province, the largest and most populous of Argentina's 23 provinces. Traveling onboard a 2011 Renault Clio, he visited all 135 partidos in the province, meeting with local activists, supporters, and members of the general public.

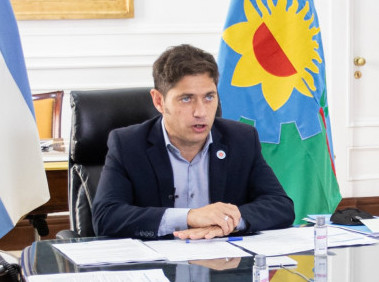
Kicillof as governor of Buenos Aires in 2021

Ahead of the 2019 Buenos Aires provincial election, Kicillof was nominated by the newly formed Frente de Todos coalition (formed by a majoritarian sector of the Justicialist Party and other peronist and progressive parties) as candidate to the governorship of Buenos Aires. The gubernatorial ticket was completed with La Matanza mayor Verónica Magario. Kicillof continued his travels onboard the 2011 Clio focusing his campaign on attacking the administration of incumbent governor María Eugenia Vidal, of the Cambiemos alliance, a close ally to president Mauricio Macri. Come election day, the Kicillof–Magario ticket received 52.15% of the votes, winning in a landslide against Vidal. He was sworn in as governor on 11 December 2019.

As part of the Union for the Homeland (UP) coalition, Kicillof and Magario were re-elected to a second term in the 2023 Buenos Aires provincial election on 22 October with 44.8% of the vote. Analysts pointed to Kicillof's successful re-election bid as a major factor in bolstering the shock victory of UP presidential hopeful Sergio Massa in the first round of 2023 Argentine general election. He was sworn-in for his second term on 11 December 2023.

=== Economic policy ===
Soon after taking office in December 2019, Kicillof declared a "state of social, economic, productive, and energy emergency" in the province. The enabling legislation authorized the provincial executive to undertake debt exclusively for repaying existing obligations, up to a limit of $66 billion ARS. It also permitted the renegotiation of debts with bondholders and suppliers, the reallocation of budgetary items, a 180-day freeze on public utility rates, and the termination of public-sector contracts. Additionally, the law introduced tax debt moratoriums for micro-enterprises. The state of emergency was established for one year, renewable for a further year. In 2020, Kicillof proposed a tax reform that increased property tax rates on a progressive scale, ranging from 15% for the smallest contributors to 75% for the largest rural landowners.

In December 2023, another law proposed by Kicillof was approved, allowing urban and rural property taxes to be raised by up to 200% for high-wealth individuals, with a minimum increase of 130%. During the same legislative session, approval was granted for the province to borrow up to 1.8 billion dollars in 2024 to service its debt obligations. In 2024, following the national approval of the Law of Bases and Starting Points for the Freedom of Argentines as part of President Javier Milei's government programme, the provincial government of Buenos Aires chose not to adhere to the national Large Investments Incentive Regime (RIGI). Instead, it proposed its own Strategic Investments Provincial Regime (Spanish: Régimen Provincial de Inversiones Estratégicas; RPIE), which featured certain differences from the national framework.

=== 2025 midterm elections ===
Ahead of the 2025 nationwide elections, Kicillof moved to separate the province's own legislative election from the national contest. The provincial legislature's decision to decouple the provincial vote from the national calendar was seen as a historical rarity. The official explanation was that separating the dates would be logistically easier as the province kept the party list ballot instead of the single list system that would be implemented for the first time in the October national contest. Politically, however, analysts widely interpreted the move as a strategic decision by Kicillof: by advancing the vote, Peronism could test its electoral strength, rally support, and potentially influence the national climate heading into October. In the September 2025 provincial midterms, Kicillof led the Peronist coalition Homeland Force to a decisive victory, securing close to 47% of the vote against La Libertad Avanza, which obtained about 34% province-wide.

== Public image ==
According to Clarín, Kicillof completed an ideological turn from teaching Marxist economics to the doctrine of Juan Perón, having joined the Justicialist Party and becoming vice president of the party. As governor, he was described by journalist Federico Rivas Molina as combining academic scholarship with overwhelming charisma. Kicillof was also the subject of a 2012 biography by journalist Ezequiel Burgo, El Creyente: ¿Quién es Axel Kicillof? (The Believer: Who Is Axel Kicillof?), which portrayed him as "the strongest Economy Minister Argentina has had in a decade". Burgo wrote that Kicillof "blindly believes in the economic policy that he transmits to the President", and that his aspiration was "to lead Argentina's economy, plan it, mold it to his liking".

== Criticism and controversies ==
=== Legal proceedings ===
In October 2015, Kicillof was indicted in the so-called "Future Dollar" case by federal judge Claudio Bonadio, accused of participating in a Central Bank scheme to sell dollar futures below market value. On 13 April 2021, he was unanimously acquitted by the Federal Chamber of Criminal Appeals for absence of crime, a decision later upheld by the Supreme Court of Argentina in 2024. Other accusations reported by the press did not advance in court, such as alleged irregularities during his time at Aerolíneas Argentinas, or purported links to private investment funds.

== Publications ==
Kicillof has published articles, both alone and in collaboration in a number of general publications, such as Clarín, La Nación, and Le Monde Diplomatique (Bolivian edition).

=== Books ===
- Radiografía de la provincia de Buenos Aires (2019), co-authored work. Siglo XXI Editores Argentina, ISBN 978-987-629-933-6.
- Y ahora, ¿qué?: desagrietar la grieta para construir un país normal (2019). Siglo XXI Editores Argentina, ISBN 978-987-629-900-8.
- Diálogos sin corbata: para pensar la economía, la política (y algunas cosas más) en el siglo XXI (2015). Siglo XXI Editores Argentina, ISBN 978-987-629-605-2.
- Volver a Keynes. Fundamentos de la teoría general de la ocupación, el interés y el dinero (2012), edited by Daniel Vila Garda. Clave Intelectual; EUDEBA, ISBN 978-849-394-719-4.
- Ensayo sobre los principios de economía política y tributación de David Ricardo, escuela neoclásica (2012). Cooperativas, ISBN 978-987-652-110-9.
- De Smith a Keynes: siete lecciones de historia del pensamiento económico. Un análisis de las obras originales (2011). EUDEBA, ISBN 978-950-23-1809-7.
- La anatomía del nuevo patrón de crecimiento y la encrucijada actual (2010), co-authored with Augusto Costa, Nicolás Arceo, Nuria Mendizábal, and María Cecilia Nahón. Atuel, ISBN 978-987-1155-70-5.
- Fundamentos de la teoría general: consecuencias teóricas de Mr. Keynes (2007). EUDEBA, ISBN 978-950-23-1612-3.
- Federalismo fiscal y coparticipación federal (1999), co-authored with Jorge Capitanich and Mónica Beatriz Zorrilla. Fundación Pro Universidad de la Producción y del Trabajo, ISBN 978-987-97659-0-6.

=== Scholarly articles ===
Kicillof has contributed many articles, both alone and in collaboration, to such economic journals as Realidad Económica, II Encontro InterNaciónal da Associação Keynesiana Brasileira, Desarrollo económico - revista de ciencias sociales, I Jornada de Economía Política de la Universidad Nacional de General Sarmiento, I Jornadas de Economía Crítica, Capital and Class, and Jornadas de Epistemología de las Ciencias Económicas.

- De Smith a Keynes: siete lecciones de Historia del Pensamiento Económico. Un análisis de las obras originales. [From Smith to Keynes: Seven historical lessons in economic thought. An analysis of the original works.] Buenos Aires, EUDEBA, 2010.ISBN 978-950-23-1758-8
- La macroeconomía después de la Convertibilidad. In CENDA, La anatomía del nuevo patrón de crecimiento y la encrucijada actual. La economía argentina período 2002-2010, Ed. Atuel. Buenos Aires, Colección Cara o Ceca, 2010. Co-authored with Agis, E.; Girard, C.; and Marongiu, F.

== Personal life ==
Kicillof is married to Soledad Quereilhac, a professor of literature at the University of Buenos Aires and the author of a 2014 book, La imaginación científica. Ciencias ocultas y literatura fantástica en el Buenos Aires de entre-siglos (1875-1910) (The Scientific Imagination: occult sciences and fantasy literature in turn-of-the-century Buenos Aires (1875-1910)). They have two children. Since assuming office as governor, he has lived at the Gubernatorial Residence in La Plata; the Kicillof family previously lived in the Buenos Aires neighborhood of Parque Chas.

He speaks English and French fluently. His younger sister, Irene, is a psychologist and translator. His older brother, Nicolás, is a software engineer who lives in New York City.

== Electoral history ==
=== Executive ===
Electoral history of Axel Kicillof
Election	Office	List	Votes			Result	Ref.
Election	Office	List	Total	%	P.	Result	Ref.
2019	Governor of Buenos Aires	Frente de Todos	5,274,511	52.40%	1st	Elected	
2023	Governor of Buenos Aires	Unión por la Patria	4,233,092	44.88%	1st	Elected	

=== Legislative ===
Electoral history of Axel Kicillof
Election	Office	List	#	District	Votes			Result	Ref.
Election	Office	List	#	District	Total	%	P.	Result	Ref.
2015	National Deputy	Front for Victory	1	City of Buenos Aires	437,380	22.37%	2nd (Note: Presented on an electoral list. The data shown represents the share of the vote the entire party/alliance received in that constituency.)	Elected	

Political offices
Preceded by Hernán Lorenzino	Minister of the Economy; 2013–2015	Succeeded by Alfonso Prat-Gay
Preceded by María Eugenia Vidal	Governor of Buenos Aires; 2019–present	Incumbent
