= Carolina Píparo =

Argentine politician and social worker (born 1976)

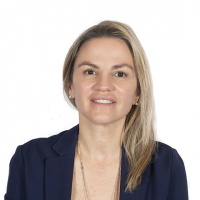

National Deputy
- Incumbent
- Assumed office 10 December 2021
- Constituency: Buenos Aires

Provincial Deputy of Buenos Aires
- In office 10 December 2017 – 10 December 2021
- Constituency: Capital Electoral Section

Personal details
- Born: 12 September 1976 (age 50) La Plata, Argentina
- Party: Independent (2017–2023, 2024–present)
- Other political affiliations: La Libertad Avanza (2023, 2024–present); Buenos Aires Libre (2023–2024); Avanza Libertad (2021–2023); Juntos por el Cambio (2017–2021)
- Education: Universidad del Salvador
- Occupation: Social worker

Carolina Píparo (born 12 September 1976) is an Argentine social worker and politician. Since 2021, she has been a member of the Argentine Chamber of Deputies; she was initially elected as part of the Avanza Libertad alliance, but later joined the La Libertad Avanza coalition led by Javier Milei. In 2023, she defected from LLA and formed her own political bloc, called "Buenos Aires Libre". In 2024 she came back to La Libertad Avanza.

Piparo is the granddaughter of Italian migrants.
