= Néstor Grindetti =

Argentine actuary and politician

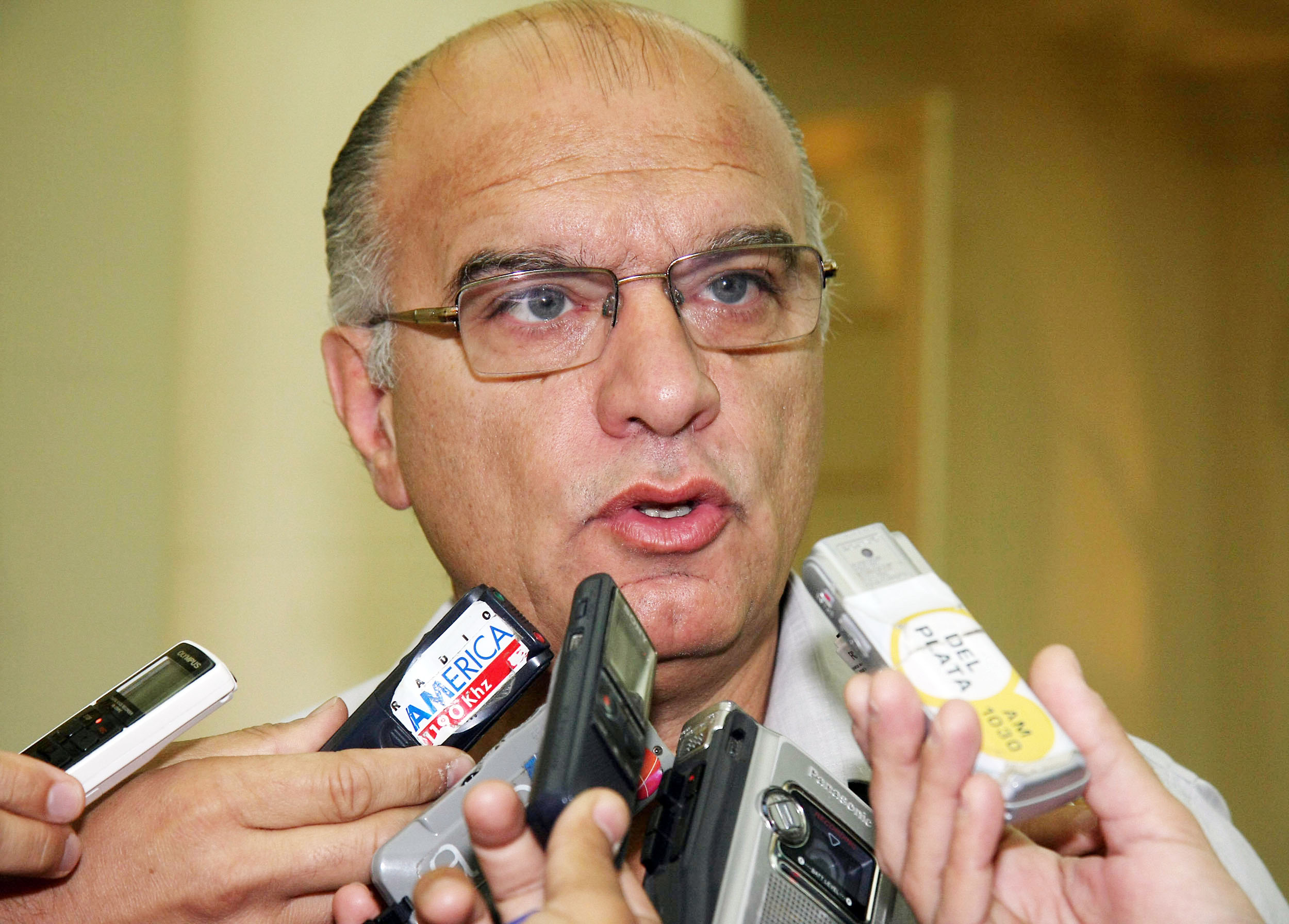
Néstor Grindetti (November 23, 2011)

Nestor Osvaldo Grindetti is an Argentine actuary and politician.

He was Minister of Finance of the Autonomous City of Buenos Aires from 2007 to 2015, before becoming mayor of Lanús, an industrial city south of Buenos Aires.
